= Dandelion (disambiguation) =

A dandelion is a species of flower in the genus Taraxacum.

Dandelion may also refer to:

== Botany ==
- Taraxacum officinale, the common dandelion
- False dandelion, a number of plants similar to dandelions

== Film ==
- Dandelion (2004 film), an American drama
- Dandelion (2014 film), a Vietnamese romantic comedy
- Dandelion (2024 film), an American drama
- Tampopo (タンポポ, "dandelion"), a 1985 Japanese comedy

== Literature ==
- Dandelion (Watership Down), a fictional rabbit in the novel Watership Down
- Dandelion (The Witcher), a character in The Witcher fantasy novels by Polish writer Andrzej Sapkowski
- Dandelion (manga), a Japanese one-shot manga by Hideaki Sorachi
- Dandelion, a literary journal started by Joan Clark

== Music ==
- Dandelion Records, a record label in the United Kingdom
- Dandelion (band), a Philadelphia-based grunge band
- Dandelion (album), by Ella Langley, 2026
  - "Dandelion" (Ella Langley song), the title song of the album
- Dandelions (album), by King of the Slums, 1989
- "Dandelion" (Ariana Grande song), 2025
- "Dandelion" (Galantis and Jvke song), 2021
- "Dandelion" (Rolling Stones song), 1967
- "Dandelions" (song), by Ruth B, 2017
- "Dandelion", by Audioslave from Out of Exile, 2005
- "Dandelion", by Boards of Canada from Geogaddi, 2002
- "Dandelion", by Gabbie Hanna from Bad Karma (EP), 2020
- "Dandelion", by Jaehyun from J, 2024
- "Dandelion", by Kacey Musgraves from Same Trailer Different Park, 2013
- "Dandelion", by Tracy Bonham from The Liverpool Sessions, 1995
- "Dandelions", by Five Iron Frenzy from Quantity Is Job 1, 1998

== Transportation ==
- USS Dandelion (1862), A Civil War era U.S. Navy steam tug
- USLHT Dandelion (1872), and USLHT Dandelion (1917), 2 separate steam tenders of the United States Lighthouse Service

== Technology ==
- Dandelion Energy, a geothermal heating installation company owned by Alphabet Inc.
- Dandelion chip, enables metering and focus indication for older lenses on certain types of camera bodies
- Dandelion, code name for one of the Xerox Star series of workstations

== Other uses ==
- Dandelion and burdock, a popular British soft drink
- Dandelion (crayon color), a Crayola color
