= Comcast Ventures =

American venture capital firm

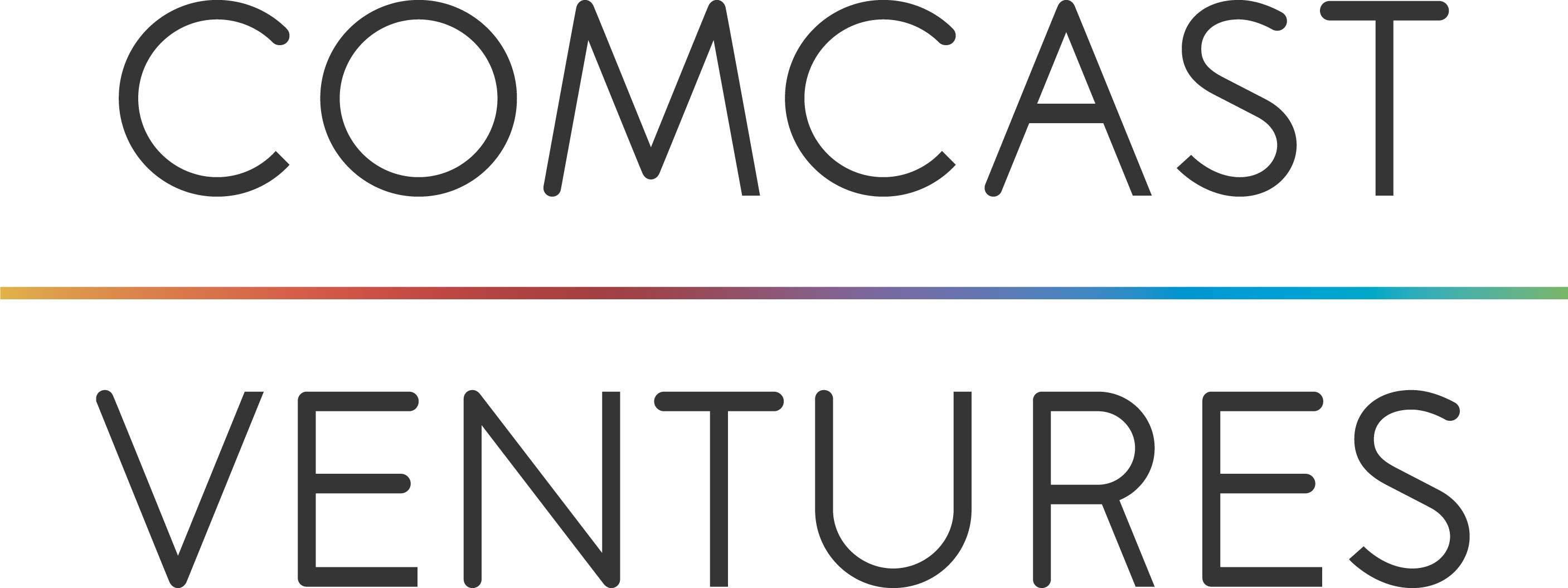
- Type: Private
- Industry: Private equity
- Founded: 1999; 27 years ago
- Defunct: n/a
- Headquarters: New York, New York, U.S.
- Parent: Comcast
- Website: www.comcastventures.com

Comcast Ventures is a corporate venture capital firm headquartered in New York, NY.

== History ==
In early 2011, Comcast and NBCUniversal combined their two venture arms, Comcast Interactive Capital founded in 1999 and the Peacock Fund, to form Comcast Ventures.

In 2012, Comcast Ventures set up the Catalyst Fund with $20 million under management to invest in underrepresented entrepreneurs. In January 2020, NBA Champion Andre Iguodala joined the Catalyst Fund as a Venture Partner.

In November 2020, Comcast announced its venture arm would be folded into the corporate business division led by Sam Schwartz. Between 2011 and 2020, Amy Banse was the Managing Director and Head of Funds. The firm’s partners also included Gil Beyda, Andrew Cleland, Sam Landman, Dinesh Moorjani, Rick Prostko, Dave Zilberman, Daniel Gulati, and Kim Armor.

In November 2021, Allison Goldberg joined Comcast Ventures as Managing Partner. Allison previously served as Group Managing Director & Senior Vice President of Time Warner Investments, where she ran the group focused on investing up to $25MM in private companies to generate both strategic value and financial returns for Time Warner Inc.

As of December 2023, the group's partners include Allison Goldberg, Marc Silberman, and Michelle Chang.

== Investments ==
Comcast has been ranked the 4th Corporate Startup Investor in the World. In the past six years up to 2017, the corporation had invested in 105 early-stage companies. These companies include Away (luggage), CloudPassage, Dandelion Energy FanDuel, Quantifind, Slack Technologies, Vox Media, Yieldmo, and ZeroFox.
