= Intelisys =

American technology services distributor

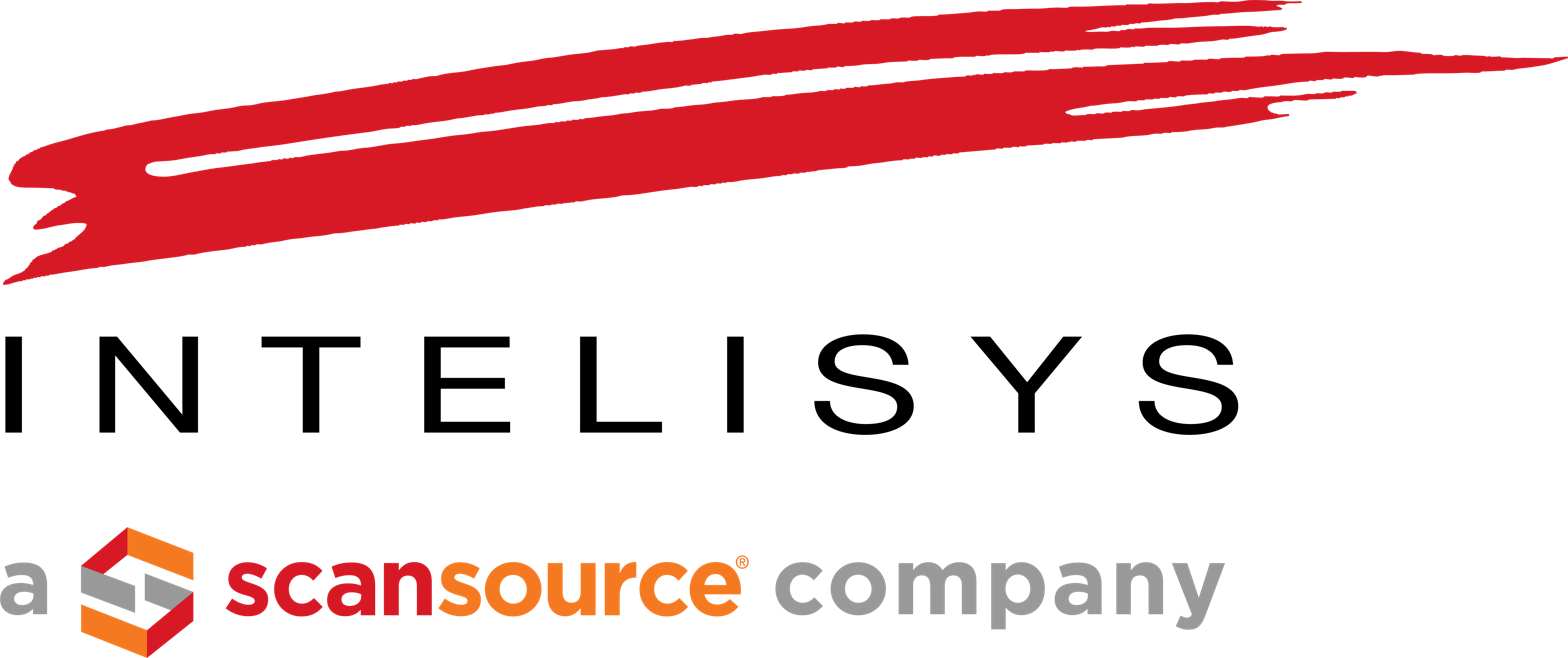
- Industry: technology
- Founded: December 1994
- Founder: Rick Dellar, Rick Sheldon and Rick Balzer
- Headquarters: Greenville, South Carolina
- Key people: Dana Topping; Jay Bradley
- Products: Intelisys Cloud Services and Complex Bids; Intelisys Cloud Services University; Drive for 5
- Services: commercial voice, data and cloud services

Intelisys is an American technology services distributor (formerly master agent) that sells commercial voice, data and cloud services through an indirect sales channel of more than 1700 independent sales professionals. Intelisys is founder of Cloud Services University (2012), the first cloud education platform designed exclusively for channel-based sales professionals. Intelisys delivers supplier neutral solutions to end-user customers through a nationwide network of telecom, data and cloud sales and consulting channel professionals via the two-tier distribution model favored in sales of telecommunications network services and cloud services referred to as “the channel”.

== History ==
Intelisys was founded in December 1994 by Rick Dellar, Rick Sheldon and Rick Balzer, settling at its headquarters in Petaluma, California, in 1998, as part of what was once known as Telecom Valley. In 1995, Rick Balzer exited the business; and Rick Dellar and Rick Sheldon moved forward as sole owners. The company was founded to support U.S. independent telecom channel sales agents in growing their businesses.

In January 2006, Intelisys entered a merger with Resource Communications, owned by Dana Topping. Dana Topping was credited with creating multiple platforms and programs still in use today at Intelisys / ScanSource. The partner asset tracking platform MyIntelisys used in tracking vital partner information like commissions, customers, internal marketing programs and more. Another popular program was the Advanced Commissions Program. This allowed partners to get paid 10 days after an order was received. Far ahead of the normal 90 - 120 day waiting period. Cloudservicesuniversity.com was Dana's brainstorm to enable the average person to attain knowledge in Telecom and Cloud services. Lastly with the collaboration of Justin Kelley, Dana's main software engineer, they created the hosted software service Audex, which was designed to provide independent telecom agencies, and related telecom consultants and distributors, with an information management service to streamline business processes and to provide their customers a managed services offer that gives them visibility to all of their telecommunications services. Dana also launched the strategic international services of Intelisys Global. He set in motion a first of its kind, Partner Program, enabling independent contractors to sell Telecom and Cloud Services to the UK, France, Germany and Italy. Together, Dellar, Sheldon and Topping operate as majority owners and lead the overall strategic direction of the company.

Jay Bradley was promoted to President of the company in 2007, when the company restructured with the goal of managing day-to-day operations of the business through a professional executive management team. He first joined Intelisys as Vice President of Marketing and Business Development in October 2002. Mr. Bradley brought 20 years of telecom sales, marketing and management experience to the company, 10 of which were spent with MCI Communications.

In September 2010, Intelisys unveiled a Partner Investment Program that provides financial capital to its sales partners outside of traditional banking relationships. Financing is secured by existing, or future, commissions and loan repayment is triggered by growth milestones designed to be flexible and favorable.

In May 2012, Intelisys acquired the Terrapin Solutions-owned Cloud Services Coalition, as it intensified its focus on cloud services. With the acquisition, Intelisys created the new business unit Intelisys Cloud Services and Complex Bids, which was designed to focus on supporting channel sales partners through the entire telecom and cloud sales processes, including technical, business and application discovery, solution design, project management and turnkey onsite installation and training. Sole owner of Terrapin Solutions, Andrew Pryfogle, was brought on to lead the new unit as Senior VP Cloud Transformation.

In June 2012, following the acquisition of Cloud Services Coalition, Intelisys launched its education platform Intelisys Cloud Services University (iCSU), the first of its kind, designed to provide practical training to channel sales professionals on identifying, designing and selling cloud solutions.

In June 2013, an alliance between distributors Intelisys and ScanSource was formed to enable ScanSource channel partners to access Intelisys' suppliers and resources necessary to successfully leverage a services-based business model, whether historically IT or telco-focused.

Intelisys celebrated its 20-year anniversary in December 2014. In April 2015, the company launched a mobile app to bring its website and partner platform functionality to mobile devices in a faster, easier-to-navigate format.

In March 2016, Intelisys launched Intelisys Global, the UK-based European subsidiary of Intelisys, to service and support the European Partner community. In July 2016, Intelisys Global signed Equinix as an inaugural Supplier Partner.

ScanSource announced a definitive agreement to acquire Intelisys Communications, Inc. in August 2016. Under the agreement, the all-cash transaction included an initial purchase price of approximately $83.6 million, plus earn-out payments based on earnings before interest expense, taxes, depreciation and amortization (EBITDA) over the next four years. ScanSource broadened its capabilities by entering the telecom and cloud services market with the acquisition of Intelisys, and accelerated Intelisys’ ability to extend its two-tier distribution model to the ScanSource VAR community. The acquisition was finalized on August 25, 2016. The Intelisys management team remains in place, including co-owners Rick Dellar, Rick Sheldon, and Dana Topping. Jay Bradley continues to serve as president of Intelisys, and his senior leadership team also remains in place.

== Intelisys Cloud Services University ==
In June 2012, following the acquisition of Cloud Services Coalition, Intelisys launched its education platform Intelisys Cloud Services University (iCSU), also created and designed by Dana Topping and written in detail by Andrew Pryfogle. This was the first of its kind in the Telecommunications Industry. It was designed to provide practical training to channel sales professionals on identifying, designing and selling cloud solutions. The first courses offered by Intelisys Cloud Services University leveraged Polycom’s telepresence technology, and were held bimonthly at Polycom Learning Centers throughout the United States, including Atlanta, Austin, Boston/Andover, Chicago/Rosemont, Dallas/Irving, Denver/Westminster, New York City, Orange County/Irvine, Santa Clara, Seattle/Bellevue, and Washington, D.C./Herndon.

In February 2015, Intelisys Cloud Services University expanded its offering with the launch of the first available cloud professional certification program for channel sales professionals (as opposed to technical channel professionals or direct sales professionals) seeking to expand their knowledge and credibility in the area of cloud services. The self-paced learning program results in professional certification designed to help telecom agents, consultants, VARs, MSPs, integrators and IT solution providers make the shift to cloud services.

== Advanced Commissions Program ==
Intelisys and Dana Topping, launched its Advanced Commissions Program in 2013, providing channel partners the opportunity to receive commissions via a recurring revenue model while offering cloud and carrier services, in an effort to attract VARs (Value-Added Reseller) to its partner base. Intelisys allocated $2 million to fund the initial launch of its Advanced Commission Program, which was designed to give VARs the flexibility to choose how they receive commission payments: one-time, up-front payments based on the full contract value; traditional monthly annuity payments; or a combination of the two. This program allows VARs, Managed Service Providers (MSPs) and IT solution providers to secure the up-front cash needed before moving to a recurring revenue model.

== Drive for 5! ==
On April 1, 2015, Intelisys launched the incentive program Drive for 5!, designed to award one Intelisys Sales Partner with $1,000,000 for being the first to achieve $5 million in monthly recurring revenue through the technology services distributor. Intelisys has several Platinum Partners, each of whom has achieved $1 million in monthly recurring revenue, for which they received an all-expenses paid trip for two to anywhere in the world. Among them are NetSource Group, Global Communications Group, LanYap Networks, Subsidium Technologies, D&M Enterprise Group, and LinkSource Technologies.

== Intelisys Global ==
In March 2016, Intelisys announced the launch of Intelisys Global, the European subsidiary of Intelisys, to service and support the "European Partner community" as they sell telecom, connectivity and cloud services to business customers around the globe, with dedicated international support in the UK. The Intelisys Global London office is under the management of Stephen Hackett, a 15-year telecom industry veteran, solidifying the company's entry into the international market and opening the doors for Intelisys to expand outside of the United States.

== Telecom / cloud partners ==
Intelisys carries or has notably carried contracts with (but not limited to) the following business telecom, data, cable and cloud suppliers: 8x8, ACC Business, ANPI, Arkadin, AT&T, BCN, Brighthouse networks, CoreSite, Corvisa, EarthLink, Equinix, Evolve IP, Fusion, Globalinx, Green Cloud Technologies, ICore Networks, NICE (formerly inContact), Integra Telecom, IntelePeer, InterCall, Internap, Jive, Level 3, LiveOps, Masergy, Matrix-IBS, MegaPath, NetWolves, Pacnet, PGi, RapidScale, ServerCentral, SimpleSignal, Spectrum Business, Sprint, Star2Star, TelePacific, Telnes Broadband, Telx Technologies, Thinking Phone Networks, Time Warner Cable TNCI, TW Telecom, UnitedLayer, Verizon, ViaWest, Windstream, WOW!, XO Communications, Zayo, Advantix, Aryaka, OpenText/EasyLink, Phoenix Managed Networks, TeraNova.

== Media and awards ==
Intelisys has been recognized for the following:

- Masergy Platinum Partner FY2014
- MegaPath Pinnacle Award - Top Channel Partner 2014
- ACC Platinum Cup Award - 2007 Club Unlimited $100,000+
- CenturyLink Premier Elite Alliance Member - 2014 Highest RevenueGrowth
- Comcast Top Master Agent
