= Criticism of Comcast =

The current logo of Comcast, with the NBC peacock

A number of different controversies and criticisms have surrounded Comcast for various reasons over its recent history. Customers of the telecommunications company report low levels of customer satisfaction on both service and cost. Comcast has also had several customer service scandals, the most notorious of which featured a representative not allowing a customer to cancel his service. This clip went viral. Comcast has also been widely criticized, most publicly by Netflix, for its position against net neutrality, the principle that all traffic on the internet should be treated equally.

== Low customer satisfaction ==
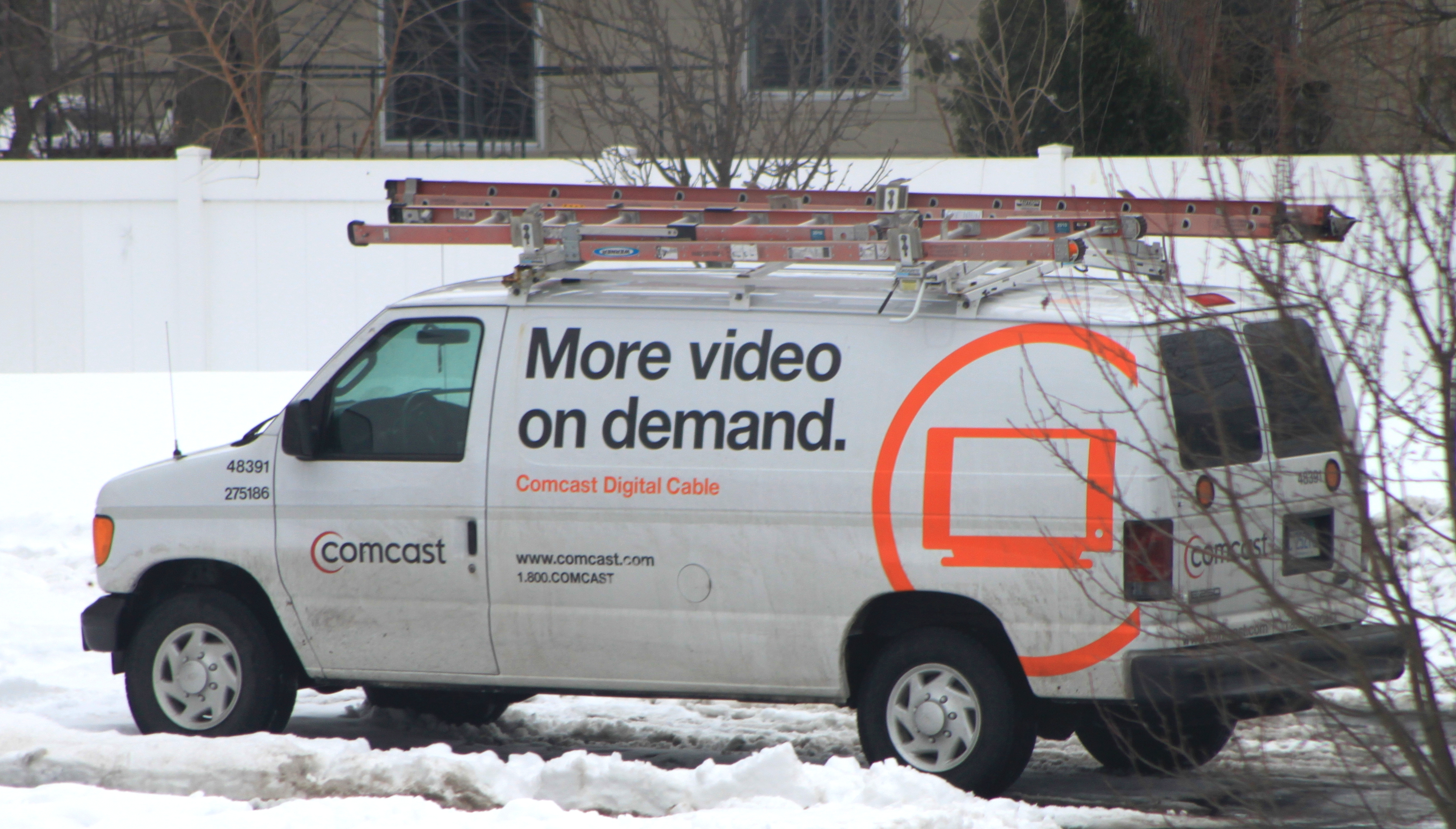
Comcast service van, Ypsilanti Township, Michigan

In 2004 and 2007, the American Customer Satisfaction Index (ACSI) survey found that Comcast had the worst customer satisfaction rating of any company or government agency in the country, including the Internal Revenue Service. The ACSI indicates that almost half of all cable customers (regardless of company) have registered complaints, and that cable is the only industry to score below 60 in the ACSI. Comcast's customer service rating by the ACSI surveys indicate that the company's customer service has never improved since the surveys began in 2001. Analysis of the surveys states that "Comcast is one of the lowest scoring companies in ACSI. As its customer satisfaction eroded by 7% over the past year, revenue increased by 12%." The ACSI analysis also addresses this contradiction, stating that "Such pricing power usually comes with some level of monopoly protection and most cable companies have little competition at the local level. This also means that a cable company can do well financially even though its customers are not particularly satisfied." In 2009 Comcast rebounded on its ACSI rating for television and Internet services, moving ahead of Charter Communications and into a tie with Time Warner Cable.

When the cable television needs assessment report for the city of Fort Collins, Colorado, February 10, 2004 which was required for Comcast's franchise renewal, the city's independent consultant found:
"Approximately 62% of the respondents, though, were very dissatisfied (along with another 25% who were dissatisfied) with the cost of cable television service."
"A majority of the respondents were satisfied with the friendliness and courtesy of customer service personnel. Overall, approximately 43% of the respondents rated the cable company's performance as fair, 30% regarded it as poor and another 30% rated the cable company's performance as good."

While Comcast does operate some of its own customer service call centers, it also outsources customer service and some technical support to Convergys Inc and until recently Transcom WorldWide, both third party call center companies.

On October 1, 2008, J.D. Power and Associates published its annual customer satisfaction survey for the nation's top 10 largest cable and satellite television providers. Comcast scored in the bottom 5 for each region of the United States, including 10th in the East Region. One of the largest internet based consumer-review services, Rateitall.com reports the average consumer review of Comcast as 1.6 out of 5 stars, based on a total of 511 reviews to date (2014).

Consumer affairs blog The Consumerist named Comcast "Worst Company in America" in 2010 and 2014. The company received the "Golden Poo" award to its Philadelphia headquarters in commemoration of the victory. The company also finished in the "top" three in 2008, 2009, 2011, and 2013. Since 2006, it has received more Golden, Silver and Bronze awards for poor customer service performance than any other company in the country, including Wal-Mart, Bank of America, and Ticketmaster.

Comcast has made efforts to improve customer satisfaction, including the Comcast Cares Digital Team. The Comcast Cares Digital Team began when then Customer Service Manager Frank Eliason decided Twitter would be an ideal way to communicate with customers. In 2010, @ComcastBonnie won the Customer Service category at the 2010 Shorty Awards.

The 2015 ACSI survey placed Comcast at or close to the bottom of primary company rankings in TV, Internet, and phone service.

The 2016 ACSI survey placed Comcast in the bottom half (11th out of 14) of Internet Service Providers and 8th out of 13 on subscription television service. The 2016 Consumer Reports' telecom service Ratings reported that Comcast was among the bottom dwellers in overall customer satisfaction.

Frequent complaints about Comcast's service include "stuffing" bills with unnecessary services, hidden service fees, outsized cancellation fees and improper credit checks.

=== Customer service after Hurricane Ike ===
Shortly after Hurricane Ike hit the Galveston, Texas, area in 2008, customers received bills and later collection notices for unreturned equipment that was destroyed during the storm. One customer reported a $931 bill which included a $66 credit for interrupted phone service, but also included a $1,000 charge for not returning her rented DVR, cable modem, and other equipment. Comcast responses differed after the storm, with some customer care agents telling customers to file with their insurance providers, and other agents advising customers to return their equipment, even if it was ruined or moldy.

=== 2014 customer service scandals ===
In July 2014, technology journalist Ryan Block recorded a conversation with Comcast during which he attempted to disconnect his service, and was repeatedly met with questions from the employee. The recording immediately went viral, resulting in an official apology from Comcast.

In August, two similar stories went viral. One customer posted a YouTube video in which his call to cancel his service was put on hold until Comcast customer support offices closed. Another customer recorded a series of conversations in which Comcast promised him he would not be charged for certain services, charged him anyway, and then refused to reimburse him for the charges until he revealed that he had recorded the initial call. When the representative explained that she would only credit him because of the recording, the customer asked, "You're telling me that if I didn't have a recording of that call, you wouldn't have been able to do it?" "Yes, that is correct", she replied.

In the same month, rapper Dann Furia blogged that he had contacted Comcast 25 times in six months without any resolution to a problem of $1,320 in wrongful charges.

Comcast customer Conal O'Rourke made headlines in October after his accounting firm, PricewaterhouseCoopers (PwC), fired him as a result of his complaints against Comcast. O'Rourke contacted Comcast several times to dispute overcharging and improper fees, but problems continued for a year without resolution. He contacted Lawrence J. Salva, Comcast's chief accounting officer and controller, and after more failed attempts at resolution threatened to involve the Public Company Accounting Oversight Board. Salva then contacted a partner at PwC and alleged that O'Rourke had behaved unethically. PwC terminated his employment as a result. Neither Comcast nor PwC will release recordings or documentation of O'Rourke's calls; they have also refused to disclose the content of the communications between Salva and the PwC partner that resulted in the decision to dismiss O'Rourke. PwC provides consulting services for Comcast, from which it garners upwards of $30 million a year in revenue. Salva was himself employed as a partner at PwC for 12 years before joining Comcast. Comcast publicly apologized for O'Rourke's treatment, though denied influencing O'Rourke's termination from PwC.

=== 2015 customer name change scandal ===
In January 2015, Lisa Brown, a Comcast subscriber from Spokane, Washington, called Comcast in an attempt to downgrade her cable package, she was offered an upgrade which she declined. On her next billing cycle, she discovered the name on her bill was changed to "Asshole Brown". Comcast released a statement stating, "We have spoken with our customer and apologized for this completely unacceptable and inappropriate name change, We have zero tolerance for this type of disrespectful behavior and are conducting a thorough investigation to determine what happened. We are working with our customer to make this right and will take appropriate steps to prevent this from happening again." The employee in question was terminated. Brown's name was fixed, and a refund for two years of service was given.

=== Washington state lawsuit ===
In 2016, Bob Ferguson, the attorney general of the state of Washington, initiated a lawsuit against Comcast. He alleged that their equipment insurance plan, called the Service Protection Plan was "deceptively added the SPP to many of its Washington customers' accounts without their knowledge or consent." The suit, which also claimed that the plan provided little actual coverage, asserted that Washington residents had paid for $73 million for the fraudulent services.

== Net neutrality ==
In 2006, Comcast implemented measures using Sandvine hardware which sends forged TCP RST (reset) packets, disrupting multiple protocols used by peer-to-peer file sharing networks. This prevented most Comcast users from uploading files.

In August 2007, TorrentFreak reported that Comcast had been preventing BitTorrent users from seeding files. In October 2007, the Associated Press reported that Comcast "actively interferes with attempts by some of its high-speed Internet subscribers to share files online, a move that runs counter to the tradition of treating all types of Net traffic equally". In November 2007, Comcast's limiting of torrent applications was confirmed by a study conducted by the Electronic Frontier Foundation (EFF), in which public domain literature is distributed over peer-to-peer networks. Analysis of the EFF study found "strong evidence that Comcast is using packet-forging to disrupt peer-to-peer (P2P) file sharing on their network". The studies showed that Comcast prevents distribution of files over peer-to-peer networks by sending a RST packet under the guise of the end user, and denying the connection, which effectively blocks the user from seeding over BitTorrent. Legal controversy arises because instead of simple filtering, Comcast is sending RST packets to Comcast customers, pretending to be the host user at the other end of the BitTorrent connection. Comcast's BitTorrent throttling is a partnership with Sandvine.

Comcast uses RST packets on groupware applications that have nothing to do with file sharing. A Lotus Notes messaging engineer noticed strange behavior with Lotus Notes dropping emails when hooked up to a Comcast connection and verified Comcast's reset packets are the culprit. A lawsuit, Hart v. Comcast, was filed accusing Comcast of false advertising and other unfair trade practices for allegedly advertising unlimited high-speed Internet access while working to restrict their customers' usage of the Internet.

In 2007, Comcast customers reported a sporadic inability to use Google Search, because forged RST packets interfered with HTTP access to google.com, which has further angered users.

In January 2008, the FCC announced that it would investigate complaints that Comcast "actively interferes with Internet traffic as its subscribers try to share files online". Comcast admitted they paid people to hold seats to "pack" the February 25, 2008, FCC hearing. The FCC stated it expected to rule on the issue by June 30, 2008. Comcast and BitTorrent Inc. agreed in late March 2008 to work together in a collaborative effort that will leave the network provider to reconfigure its network to manage traffic in a more protocol-agnostic way. Implementation was projected for late 2008.

Prior to implementation of Comcast's agreements with BitTorrent, Inc., Comcast was continuing to limit bandwidth available to peer to peer applications. In April 2008, Comcast proposed a "P2P Bill of Rights and Responsibilities" to address potential copyright infringement by users of peer to peer applications, but some argued that this is an attempt by Comcast to strengthen its traffic management capability rather than fight copyright infringement.

In August 2008 the FCC stated that Comcast's network management was unreasonable and that Comcast must terminate the use of its discriminatory network management by the end of the year. (File no: EB-08-IH-1518). On January 18, 2009, after reconfiguring their traffic management regime, Comcast was asked by the FCC to address their alleged throttling of VoIP customers. Comcast complied with the order and appealed. On June 6, 2010, the District Court of Appeals for the District of Columbia vacated the order in Comcast Corp. v. FCC.

== Privacy ==
Comcast has a one star privacy rating from the Electronic Frontier Foundation.

== Lobbying efforts ==
Comcast spends millions of dollars annually on government relationships. Comcast employs the spouses and children of mayors, councilmen, commissioners, and other officials to assure its continued preferred market allocations.

Comcast occasionally lobbies against "à la carte" bills that would give consumers the option to purchase individual channels rather than a broad tier of programming. Although they claim the reason for this is to keep customer costs lower, these issues continue to garner attention from state governments, the United States Congress and former Federal Communications Commission Chairman Kevin J. Martin.

The FCC's decision to sanction Comcast for its 2007 P2P blocking was overruled on April 6, 2010, by the US Court of Appeals for the DC Circuit. The question before the court was whether the FCC had the legal authority to "regulate an Internet service provider's network management practice". According to a three-judge panel, "the Commission has failed to make that showing" and the FCC's order against Comcast is tossed.

== HDTV claim and quality ==
Comcast has started transmitting three HD channels per Quadrature Amplitude Modulation (QAM) carrier, rather than two per QAM like some other video service providers. Though more cost effective, this additional compression has been noticed and measured by some customers as a reduction in the quality of broadcasts. Comcast claims to have more HD choices than DirecTV by including Comcast's on-demand and pay-per-view assets. Each HD on-demand program is counted as a so-called HD "choice" by Comcast.

On August 8, 2016, a Comcast employee confirmed that Comcast was downgrading native 1080i channels to the 720p60 format.

== Crimes by contractors ==
There have been instances of attack, theft, rape and other crimes by Comcast contractors. These have taken place during home installations, service calls, door-to-door flyering, and neighborhood visits.

== Signal intrusion and accidental transmission of pornography ==
On May 1, 2007, during a broadcast of the preschool program Handy Manny, Comcast had briefly replaced the program on Disney Channel's cable channel assignment with hardcore pornography for subscribers in Lincroft, New Jersey. Comcast's response to the complaints that ensued from the incident claimed that "We are continuing to investigate the root cause of the incident." A spokesperson for Disney Channel said in a statement "We value the trust that parents have in Disney Channel and our programming ... and certainly take [Tuesday's] regrettable programming disruption in New Jersey extremely seriously."

On February 7, 2008, Comcast subscribers in Nashville, Tennessee, also saw pornography via the cable provider on Cartoon Network. The incident, which happened in the early morning hours, was broadcast for at least an hour. Vice president of Nashville's Comcast provider, John Gauder apologized and stated "We apologize for any inconvenience some of our Comcast cable TV customers in Middle Tennessee experienced Thursday as a result of some highly unusual issues ... It appears that a subscription movie channel was inadvertently shown on other channels which normally carry news, sports, children's and other entertainment programming ... We are taking the appropriate steps to ensure that this highly unusual incident does not happen again." Comcast said that engineers thought they had fixed the glitch which occurred on multiple cable channels at midnight earlier that night, but the error reappeared at around 4 a.m., when the cable company decided to remove the channels from the lineup.

On February 1, 2009, during Super Bowl XLIII, Comcast's transmission of NBC affiliate KVOA (channel 4) in Tucson, Arizona, was interrupted for approximately 20 seconds replacing the telecast of the game via NBC (which was not owned by Comcast at the time) with softcore porn from the adult pay-per-view channel Shorteez. This accidental display affected Comcast's analog cable subscribers in parts of the Tucson area. The substitution appears to have been made at Comcast, not at KVOA, leaving KVOA's over-the-air, satellite and other cable providers viewers unaffected. Also, Comcast's high-definition transmission of KVOA was not affected. Comcast launched an investigation on the incident with the FBI stating that it was an "isolated, malicious act". Comcast also offered to give a $10 credit to any customers who say they viewed the approximately 30-second clip. In October 2011, Frank Tanori Gonzalez, a former Cox Communications employee, admitted that he was responsible for the porn clip. He was ordered to serve three years probation and pay $1,000 in damages.

== DNS redirection ==
Comcast turned on a DNS redirection function for its Internet customers by default. When customers accidentally typed a non-existent Web address in their browser, they were then redirected to a Comcast search page saying the page was not found and offering alternatives. Comcast called this option "Domain Helper" and gave customers an option to disable it. Comcast later announced that DNS redirection was incompatible with DNSSEC, which was a priority for the company. Their DNSSEC deployment began in 2011 and as users were migrated to DNSSEC-validating servers, Domain Helper no longer was used. As of January 10, 2012, "Domain Helper" was retired when the last Comcast users were migrated to DNSSEC-validating servers. Comcast was the first ISP in the United States to fully implement DNSSEC, having both signed all of their domain names and turned on validation on all of their DNS servers. Comcast also announced that these DNSSEC-validating servers were all natively IPv6-enabled.

== NFL Network ==
On November 10, 2006, Comcast announced it would add NFL Network on digital tiers in time for the eight-game Thursday- and Saturday-night package. In August 2007 Comcast moved NFL Network from the digital tiers to the Sports Entertainment Package. This led to a lawsuit between NFL Network and Comcast, with the ruling in favor of Comcast. Comcast sent NFL Network a cease-and-desist letter to stop encouraging subscribers to leave Comcast. Comcast's agreement with the NFL Network ended in mid-2009. In February 2008 an appellate court in New York reversed field on a judgment made in May 2007 that allowed Comcast to move the network from its second most distributed tier to the company's sports tier. The New York's Supreme Court, Appellate Division, First Department, ruled the language "concerning 'additional programming package' was ambiguous and that 'neither party has established that its interpretation of the relevant contracts is a matter of law.'"

NFL Network later filed a discrimination case against Comcast with the FCC, claiming that since Comcast does not charge extra for its owned and operated sports channels Versus (now NBC Sports Network) and The Golf Channel, it is unfair to charge extra for NFL Network. On October 10, 2008, the FCC ruled as follows:

In the Second Report and Order, the Commission emphasized that the statute "does not explicitly prohibit multichannel distributors from acquiring a financial interest or exclusive rights that are otherwise permissible," and thus, that "multichannel distributors [may] negotiate for, but not insist upon such benefits in exchange for carriage on their systems." The Commission stated, however, that "ultimatums, intimidation, conduct that amounts to exertion of pressure beyond good faith negotiations, or behavior that is tantamount to an unreasonable refusal to deal with a vendor who refuses to grant financial interests or exclusivity rights for carriage, should be considered examples of behavior that violates the prohibitions set forth in Section 616." We find that the NFL has presented sufficient evidence to make a prima facie showing that Comcast indirectly and improperly demanded a financial interest in the NFL's programming in exchange for carriage. We further find that the pleadings and documentation present several factual disputes as to whether Comcast's retiring of the NFL Network is the result of Comcast's failure to obtain a financial interest in the NFL's programming. Accordingly, we direct an Administrative Law Judge to hold a hearing, issue a recommended decision on the facts underlying the financial interest claim and a recommended remedy, if necessary, and then return the matter to the Commission within 60 days.

=== FCC program access complaint ===
Comcast's trial about the NFL Network's program access complaint with the FCC began on April 14, 2009. At issue was whether Comcast's placement of the NFL Network on a digital sports tier ("Sports Entertainment Package") represented discrimination prevented by the 1992 Cable Act.

In April 2009, Comcast CEO Brian Roberts testified that Comcast was willing to move the channel from the Sports Entertainment Package to a lower priced base package if the subscriber fee was reduced to 25 cents per month. NFL Network charged 75¢ per month. He claimed Comcast saves $50 million a year in license fees by leaving the channel on its Sports Package, which leads to savings for its customers. On May 19, 2009, it was announced that a deal had been reached to move the channel to its "Digital Classic" tier.
