= Amy Banse =

American business executive (born 1959)

- Born: April 22, 1959 (age 67)
- Education: Temple University Beasley School of Law; Harvard University
- Occupations: Head of Funds, Comcast Ventures
- Years active: 1991–present
- Children: 4

Amy L. Banse (born April 22, 1959) was the Managing Director and Head of Funds for Comcast Ventures, Senior Vice President of Comcast Corporation, and serves on the board of directors at Adobe Systems Incorporated, Clorox, and Lennar.

== Education ==
Banse received a B.A. from Harvard University in 1982 and a J.D. from Temple University Beasley School of Law in 1987.

== Professional ==
Banse started her career at Comcast in 1991 as an in-house attorney responsible for programming acquisition. She spent the early part of her career overseeing the development of Comcast's cable network portfolio, including the company's investments in E! Entertainment Television, The Golf Channel and VERSUS and the launch of G4, PBS KIDS Sprout, TV One and Comcast's sports networks.

While at Comcast in 2000, Banse invested $5 million into the Women's United Soccer Association, the world's first women's professional soccer league. The league was suspended in 2003 after reports of low television ratings and low attendance.

In 2005, Banse founded Comcast Interactive Media (CIM) and led the company's online strategy over the next six years, overseeing multiple acquisitions as well as the in-house development and management of Comcast.net, Xfinity.com and Xfinitytv.com, Fancast and Swirl.

In 2010, Banse was “charged with combining two existing corporate investment funds: NBCU's Peacock Equity and Comcast Interactive Capital.” She moved from Philadelphia to San Francisco to lead Comcast Ventures as the Managing Director and Head of Funds. At Comcast Ventures, Banse's portfolio includes Automat, Flipboard, Grokker, Houzz, Madison Reed, Quantifind, Tastemade, TuneIn, Nextdoor, and more.

At the MSNBC “Know Your Value” conference for women in December 2018, Banse spoke about being a female investor and the importance of empowering women in the workplace.

== Boards ==
Amy currently serves on the Board of Directors of Adobe Systems Incorporated (Nasdaq: ADBE), Quantifind, Clorox, and TuneIn. She also serves as an advisor to the Rich Talent Group.

== Honors and awards ==
- In 2004, she was honored as a Wonder Woman by Multichannel News, Women in Cable Telecommunications (WICT), and the Digital Power list by the Hollywood Reporter.
- In 2006, she was honored by Girls, Inc. as a role model for girls during their annual Celebration Luncheon.
- In 2010, Banse received WICT's Geraldine B. Laybourne Fearless Award in 2009, ProMax's Brand Builder Award, and was named among the Cable 100 by Multichannel News.
- In 2014, San Francisco Business Times named Banse one of the Influential Women.
- In 2015, Women In Cable Technology (WICT) Northern California named Banse "Woman of the Year".
- In 2018, she was included in the Forbes Midas List of venture capitalists.

== Personal ==
Banse lives in San Francisco with her husband and their children.
