= Dan Meredith =

American journalist & media activist

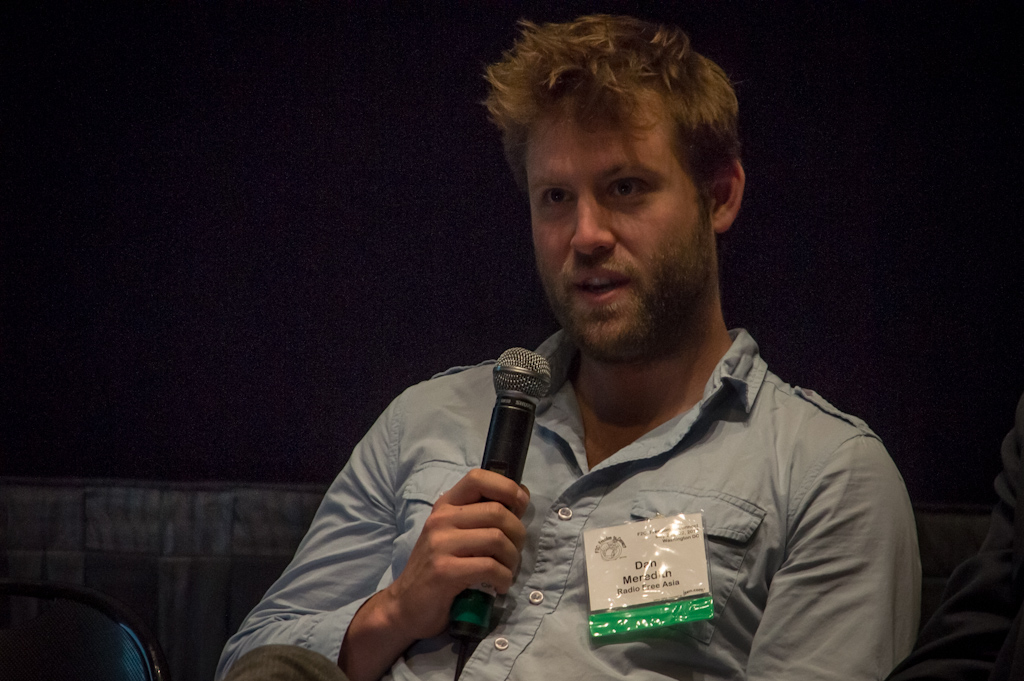
- Other name: Dan Blah
- Citizenship: American
- Occupations: Director, Open Technology Fund
- Employer: Radio Free Asia

Dan Meredith, also known as Dan Blah, is an Internet freedom supporter, journalist, technologist, and media activist. He currently is chief technologist at Reset, a privately funded non-profit funding organization. He was a founding Director of the Open Technology Fund, a U.S. Government funded program created in 2012 at Radio Free Asia to support global Internet freedom, privacy-enhancing technologies, and Internet censorship circumvention technologies. Meredith joined Al Jazeera's Transparency Unit in 2011, led by Clayton Swisher, where he increased communication security between investigative field journalists and their sources. He was an early part of the Open Technology Institute in 2009, led by Sascha Meinrath. While at OTI, Meredith was involved with: The "Internet in a Suitcase" project, a U.S. Department of State funded effort to create ad hoc mesh wireless technologies; collaborated with Philadelphia community organizers to secure US$11.8 million from the federal Broadband Technology Opportunities Program; and, worked on Network Neutrality court cases Hart v. Comcast and Comcast Corp. v. FCC with Robb Topolski, who discovered Comcast blocking Bittorrent traffic in 2007. Meredith was a co-founder and senior network engineer of the CUWiN Foundation, a non-profit launched in 2000 that aimed to develop "decentralized, community-owned networks that foster democratic cultures and local content". He was an active Indymedia volunteer throughout the mid 2000s at the Champaign-Urbana Independent Media Center (UCIMC) and its low power FM radio station, Radio Free Urbana WRFU-LP. Meredith joined the Linux Foundation's Core Infrastructure Initiative as an inaugural appointee to its Advisory Board in 2014.
