= Julian A. Brodsky =

American businessman (1933–2026)

- Born: July 16, 1933; Philadelphia, Pennsylvania, U.S.
- Died: November 5, 2026 (aged 93)
- Occupation: Businessman
- Known for: Co-Founder of Comcast Corporation

Julian A. Brodsky (July 16, 1933 – November 5, 2026) was an American businessman who co-founded Comcast Corporation and served as its chief financial officer and vice chairman. He was also the co-founder and chair of Comcast's venture capital unit, Comcast Interactive Capital.

== Early life and education ==
Brodsky was born on July 16, 1933, in Philadelphia, Pennsylvania, and graduated from the Wharton School of the University of Pennsylvania. He served two years in the United States Army before training as an accountant.

== Career ==
In 1963, Brodsky joined one of his clients, Ralph J. Roberts, and Roberts's adviser, Daniel Aaron, to purchase a 1,200-subscriber cable TV operator in Tupelo, Mississippi called American Cable Systems. They incorporated in 1969 as Comcast Corporation, a name Roberts invented by combining the words communications and broadcasting. The partners became a powerful leadership team with a style described as a threesome driving a car with Brodsky stepping on the gas by raising the necessary capital for growth, Aaron with his foot on the brakes to ensure effective operations, and Roberts with his hands on the steering wheel as CEO.

== Death ==
Brodsky died on November 5, 2026, at the age of 93. His death was announced by Comcast the following day.
