= Masergy Communications =

American networking services company

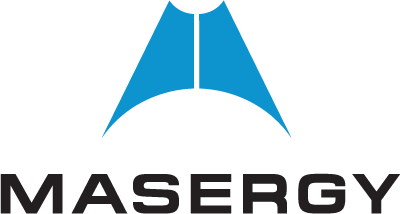
- Industry: Software
- Headquarters: Plano, Texas, United States of America
- Key people: Chris MacFarland (CEO), Robert Bodnar (CFO)
- Revenue: US$300 million (2016)
- Number of employees: 700 (2019)
- Parent: Comcast Business
- ASN: 19855
- Website: https://www.masergy.com

Masergy Communications (/ˈmeɪsərdʒi/ MAY-sər-jee) is a software-defined networking services company founded in 2000 and headquartered in Plano, Texas. The services they provide include Managed SD-WAN, Unified Communications, Cloud Contact Center, and Managed Security. Masergy was acquired by Comcast on October 8, 2021.

Some of Masergy's partners are Huisman, Pattonair, PRGX, Inc., Eurostar, Dolby Laboratories, and the Hallmark Channel.

== Corporate structure ==
=== Acquisitions and Subsidiaries ===
Chris MacFarland joined Masergy as its chief operating officer in 2008 and was named its CEO in 2010. In August 2011, Masergy was acquired by ABRY Partners LLC, a private equity investment firm, for an undisclosed price.

Masergy acquired Broadcore Communications for an undisclosed purchase price in July 2012. Broadcore offered communications services, including video calling and call recording, for businesses.

In April 2014, Masergy acquired Global DataGuard, broadening its portfolio to include managed security services for enterprise customers.

Masergy was acquired by Berkshire Partners in 2016 for an undisclosed amount and had been previously acquired by ABRY Partners LLC, a private equity investment firm, for an undisclosed price.

In September 2018, James Parker was named the new CEO.

In August 2021, Masergy Communications was acquired by Comcast Business.

== Services ==
Masergy delivers Managed SD-WAN, Unified Communications, Cloud Contact Center, and Managed Security to global enterprises for clients in industries such as manufacturing, healthcare, entertainment, finance, broadcasting, and more.

In March 2019, Masergy launched its new AI-Powered Intelligent Virtual Agent, which powers Masergy's virtual assistant and chatbot features.

In July 2019, Masergy launched its Integrated SD-WAN and Security Bundles, including options for Unified Threat Management, Threat Monitoring and Response as well as Managed Security Services.

In August 2019, Masergy launched an updated experience for its Intelligent Service Control (ISC) portal, simplifying and unifying network & application management.

In April 2020, Masergy Delivered its 2020 CCaaS and UCaaS Trends Report.

In July 2020, Masergy announced its Zenith Partner Program, and expanded its SD-WAN portfolio.

In August 2020, Masergy expands its SD-WAN portfolio offering the broadest choice, flexibility, and built-in SASE.
