= Comcast Interactive Media =

Division of Comcast focusing on digital media

- Company type: Subsidiary
- Founded: 2005
- Headquarters: Philadelphia, Pennsylvania and elsewhere, United States
- Services: Online media
- Number of employees: 500+
- Parent: Comcast
- Website: http://comcast.net

Comcast Interactive Media (CIM) was a division of Comcast focusing on digital media. CIM was created in 2005 and originally led by President, Amy Banse, and Executive Vice President, Sam Schwartz. Comcast Interactive Media products included: www.comcast.net (portal), fancast.com, Fandango, thePlatform, and StreamSage.

On May 15, 2008, Comcast Interactive Media acquired social-networking site Plaxo for between $150 and $170 million, which was subsequently shut down on December 31, 2017. On August 5, 2008, Comcast Interactive Media acquired newsletter service site DailyCandy for a rumored $125 million.
