= Michael J. Cavanagh =

American business executive (born 1966)

- Born: January 3, 1966 (age 60)
- Education: Yale University (BA); University of Chicago (JD)
- Occupation: Business executive
- Employer: Comcast
- Title: Co-Chief Executive Officer
- Spouse: Emily A. Cavanagh
- Children: 3

Michael J. Cavanagh (born January 3, 1966) is an American business executive and lawyer serving as co-CEO of Comcast since 2026, in which capacity he also leads NBCUniversal. Cavanagh was previously president of Comcast from 2022 to 2026. Cavanagh will also serve as CEO of NBCUniversal once the company completes its split from Comcast.

== Early life and education ==
Cavanagh completed a B.A. in history at Yale College in 1988. He subsequently earned a J.D. from the University of Chicago in 1993.

== Career ==
Cavanagh worked for Citigroup for seven years. From 2000 to 2004, Cavanagh worked at Bank One Corporation in several roles including head of strategy and planning and treasurer, chief administrative officer of commercial banking, and chief operating officer of middle market banking.

In 2004, Cavanagh followed Jamie Dimon from Bank One Corporation to JPMorgan Chase, where he would spend a decade in increasingly senior roles. He served as CEO of the treasury and securities services division, and subsequently as the bank's chief financial officer (CFO) for six years, during which time JPMorgan navigated the 2008 financial crisis as one of the least affected major banks. From 2012 to 2014, Cavanagh served as co-CEO of the JPMorgan Corporate and Investment Bank. He was widely considered a potential successor to Dimon as CEO of JPMorgan Chase. In 2012, Cavanagh was tasked by Dimon with leading the bank's internal investigation into the London Whale derivatives trading scandal, in which JPMorgan lost over $6 billion and subsequently paid more than $20 billion in settlements.

In March 2014, Cavanagh joined The Carlyle Group as co-president and co-chief operating officer, sharing the role with Glenn Youngkin, who would later become Governor of Virginia. He also joined Carlyle's executive board. His departure from JPMorgan, described by Dimon as "a regrettable loss," surprised many on Wall Street given his standing as a leading CEO candidate at the bank. Cavanagh remained at Carlyle for approximately one year before joining Comcast in 2015.

In 2015, Cavanagh joined Comcast as its chief financial officer (CFO). In October 2022, he was promoted to president of Comcast, with oversight of Comcast Cable, NBCUniversal, and Sky. Following the resignation of NBCUniversal CEO Jeff Shell on April 23, 2023, Cavanagh assumed oversight of NBCUniversal in addition to his existing responsibilities. In September 2025, Comcast announced that Cavanagh would be elevated to co-chief executive officer alongside chairman Brian Roberts, effective January 2026, and would join Comcast's board of directors at the same time.

On June 29, 2026, Comcast announced that it would spin-off NBCUniversal and merge it with Sky to form a new publicly-traded company under the NBCUniversal name, to be owned by Comcast shareholders, with Cavanagh as CEO.

Cavanagh is a member of the Council on Foreign Relations and serves on the board of HealthVerity. At Yale University, he served as a non-trustee member of the Yale Corporation Committee on Investments before being appointed its chairman, and was appointed a successor trustee of Yale University in 2020.

== Personal life ==
In 2012, Cavanagh resided in Westchester County, New York with his wife, lawyer Emily A. Cavanagh, and three children. By 2020, he was living in Philadelphia.
