= Viamedia, Inc. =

Cable television and ad company

Viamedia
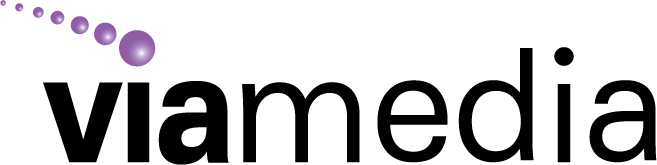
- Type: Corporation
- Industry: Advertising technology, Digital advertising, Television advertising
- Founded: 2001
- Founder: Jeff Carter; Todd Donnelly
- Headquarters: Lexington, Kentucky
- Area served: Worldwide
- Key people: David Solomon, Chief Executive Officer; Evan Rutchik, President & Chief Strategy Officer; Becky Jones, Chief Marketing & People Officer; Rick Tarvin, Chief Revenue Officer; Joel Hall, Chief Product Officer
- Products: Advertising
- Number of employees: 150+ (2025)
- Website: ViamediaTV.com

Viamedia is an independent provider of omnichannel advertising solutions headquartered in Lexington, Kentucky. The company provides advertising sales management and technology services for MVPD's, cable TV operators, and streaming and digital video providers across the United States.

As of 2025, the company manages advertising sales for more than 100 video service providers across 75 designated market areas (DMAs) in 28 states, placing over 1 million ads daily on behalf of more than 6,000 local, regional, and national advertisers.

Its offerings include linear television, connected TV (CTV), and digital advertising solutions, combining local inventory access with audience targeting and programmatic advertising technology.

Following its 2025 acquisition of LocalFactor, Viamedia expanded its programmatic advertising capabilities to support privacy-compliant audience targeting and omnichannel campaign execution.

== History ==
Viamedia was founded in 2001 by Jeff Carter and Todd Donnelly. In January 2011, Viamedia announced that it had partnered with Lake Capital, a private equity firm headquartered in Chicago, Illinois. In December 2020, the company promoted former Chief Revenue Officer, David Solomon, to president and CEO.

In March 2025, Viamedia acquired LocalFactor, a Connecticut-based digital advertising company founded in 2021. Following the acquisition, LocalFactor founder Evan Rutchik was appointed president and chief strategy officer, and the company reorganized its executive leadership team to integrate operations across linear television, streaming and digital advertising.

== Placemedia ==
Placemedia is an automated system for planning and purchasing television advertisements.

The company currently represents more than 30 billion impressions monthly in nearly 100 million households across 210 DMAs.

In 2018, Altice USA purchased Placemedia from Viamedia.

Placemedia's platform connects agencies and advertisers with television advertising inventory from Placemedia's partners, multichannel video programming distributors (MVPDs) and cable TV networks. Using its application program interface (API), Placemedia's advertising platform has been integrated into demand side platform (DSP) partners’ preexisting systems.

== Services ==
Viamedia provides advertising solutions for more than 6,000 local, regional and national advertisers, including inserting advertising onto cable networks such as ESPN, TNT, FOX News, Lifetime, HGTV, A&E, Hallmark Channel and others.

The company works with MVPDs, cable operators, and streaming services to provide advertisers with inventory across linear television, connected TV (CTV), and digital platforms.

In addition, the company has a relationship with National Cable Communications, the national TV advertising sales, marketing and technology company owned in partnership by Comcast, Charter Communications, and Cox Communications.
