= Quigo =

Quigo Technologies, Inc.
- Company type: Private
- Industry: search engine marketing
- Founded: 2000
- Founders: Yaron Galai and Oded Itzhak
- Defunct: December 2007
- Successor: Advertising.com Sponsored Listings
- Headquarters: New York City, United States
- Products: AdSonar and FeedPoint
- Owner: AOL
- Website: quigo.com

Quigo Technologies, Inc. was a privately owned search engine marketing company headquartered in New York City. Founded in Israel in 2000 by Yaron Galai and Oded Itzhak, it developed proprietary search solutions for the online contextual advertising it offered through its two products: AdSonar and FeedPoint. Popular news sites that use AdSonar include, ESPN.com, USAToday.com, FoxNews.com, and MarthaStewart.com.

Since 2005 it had steadily been gaining a market share of the $2 billion contextual advertising market controlled by Google AdSense and Yahoo!. With its transparent and client-controlled business process, "Its growing success has apparently persuaded Google that it has to change the way it sells the sponsored link ads in the future."

Quigo was acquired by AOL in December 2007 for $363M. Quigo's founding team also started Yieldmo, a mobile advertising company, in 2012. Quigo now operates under the name of Advertising.com Sponsored Listings.
