= ThePlatform =

American video publishing company

thePlatform
- Company type: Subsidiary
- Founded: 2000
- Dissolved: 2016
- Headquarters: Seattle, Washington, USA
- Owner: Comcast (from 2006)
- Key people: Ian Blaine (CEO)
- Industry: Video on demand services
- Employees: 190
- Website: www.theplatform.com

thePlatform was a Seattle, Washington based online video publishing company that was acquired by Comcast in 2006. The company worked with digital media companies to manage and publish video and audio. It was absorbed into the newly formed Comcast Technology Solutions division in October 2016.

== Products ==
thePlatform's mpx is a video management system, providing publishing tools targeting PCs, mobile phones, and TVs. mpx Essentials is a service marketed towards businesses with smaller video libraries. The mpx Dev Kit provides tools for enhancing video management systems and offers a video player design canvas.

== History ==
thePlatform was founded in 2000 by Ian Blaine, Andrew Olson, Alan Ramaley, Andy Sodt, Rahul Sonnad, and Brad Chodos-Irvine. Previously, in 1998, Blaine and Sodt founded an online personal information management company, Uniplanet, which was acquired by NBCi in 1999.

== Purchase by Comcast ==
In June 2006, Comcast purchased the Seattle-based software company thePlatform. This represented Comcast's entry into a new line of business, selling software to allow companies to manage their Internet (and IP-based) media publishing efforts. In 2014, co-founder Ian Blaine was replaced as CEO by Marty Roberts and Jamie Miller were appointed as co-CEOs. After operating as essentially a standalone unit for almost a decade, thePlatform came under the direction of Comcast Wholesale in 2015. In 2016, it was absorbed into Comcast Technology Solutions.

== Internet TV partnerships ==
Customers of thePlatform include Verizon Wireless, BBC Worldwide, CNBC, MSNBC, CBS Sports, AP, NBC Local, and HiT Entertainment.

== See also ==
- Content management system
