= TPx Communications =

Provider of managed services

TPx
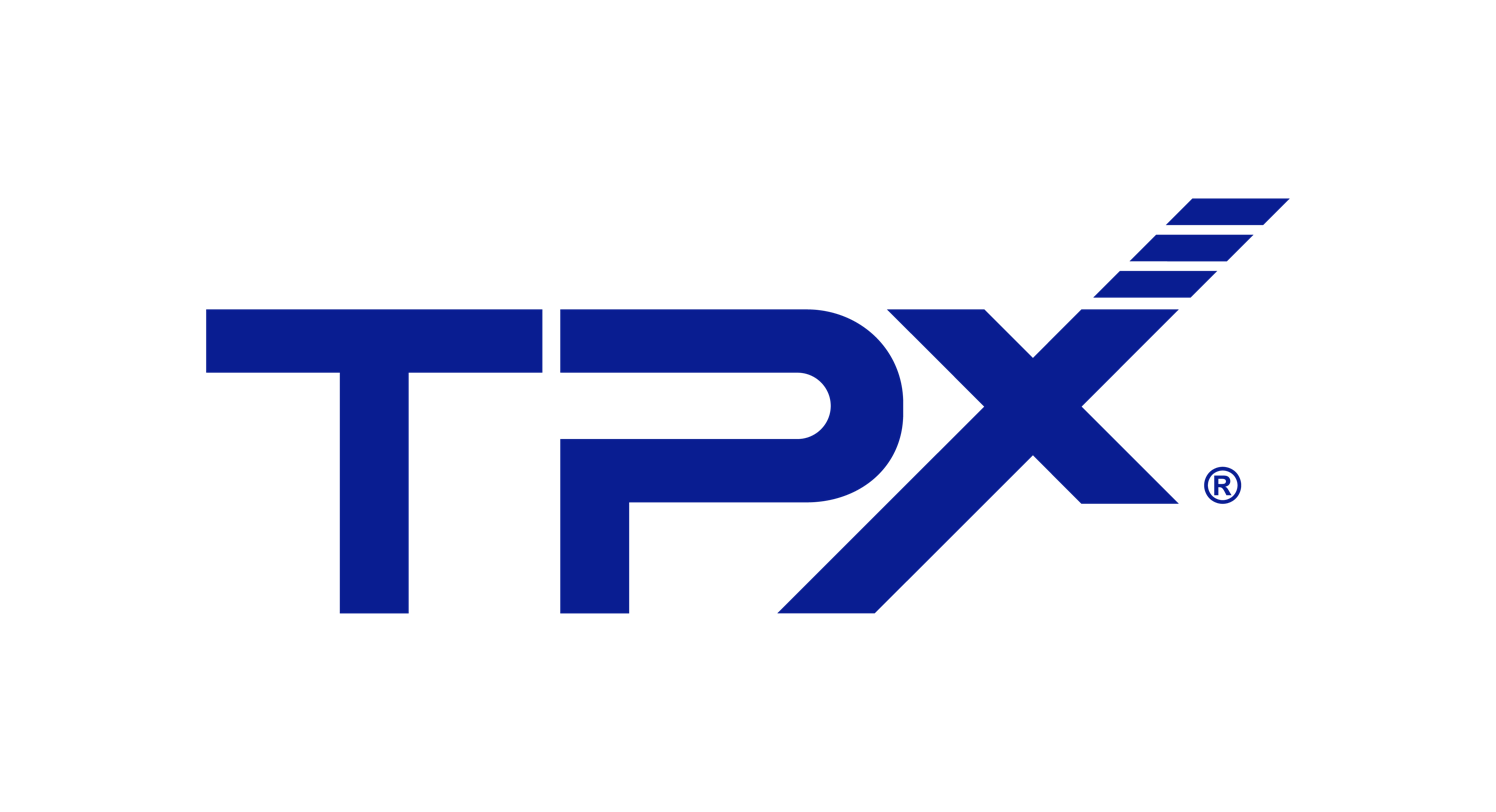
- Type: Privately Held
- Industry: Managed Services
- Predecessor: TelePacific Communications
- Founded: 1998
- Headquarters: Plaza 7000 North Mopac Expressway, Suite 2080, Austin, TX 78731; United States
- Area served: Nationwide
- Key people: Shaun Andrews (CEO)
- Products: Unified Communications, managed IT services, cybersecurity, secure networks, voice services, colocation, voice over IP services (VoIP), data networking services, business continuity, cloud, fixed wireless, datacenters, local and long distance, business lines, MPLS, SIP services, cloud services
- Services: Unified communications, managed IT services, secure networking, cybersecurity, voice, data, business continuity, mobile, cloud, colocation, data security

TPx (also known as TPx Communications, U.S. TelePacific Corp; formerly TelePacific Communications) is a privately held leading national provider of managed services. Founded in 1998, TPx delivers managed IT, unified communications as a service (UCaaS), secure networks and cybersecurity services.

== Company background ==
Founded in 1998, their initial focus was providing local connectivity as a California Competitive Local Exchange Carrier (CLEC). TPx is headquartered in Austin, TX and also has regional offices. It changed its name to TPx Communications (DBA TPx) in April 2017. On February 12, 2020, the company was acquired by affiliates of Siris Capital Group, LLC (“Siris”).

In June 2026, TPx filed for Chapter 11 bankruptcy protection after entering a restructuring support agreement to eliminate the majority of its debt and recapitalize its business.

TPx is currently led by Shaun Andrews. Other key executives include Brent Novak, Chief Financial Officer; Patti Key, Chief Revenue Officer; Jared Martin, Chief Product Officer; Aditi Dravid, Senior Vice President, General Counsel and Secretary; Carol Hilliard, COO; Barbara Porter, Chief of Staff, EPMO.

== Recent acquisitions ==
In September 2016, TPx (then TelePacific) acquired leading managed services provider DSCI. With the addition of DSCI's Northeastern presence and customer base, TPx accelerated its transition from a regional to national managed services provider. Key DSCI products included unified communications and managed IT solutions.

In May 2011, TPx announced plans to acquire Orange County Internet Xchange and finalized the acquisition in June 2011. In June 2011, TPx announced the acquisition of Tel West in Texas , which expanded TelePacific's footprint into Texas. Tel West brought TelePacific about 3,400 Small and Medium Business (SMB) customers across Texas, as well as a service portfolio of high speed Internet and other telecommunications services, including nationwide capabilities.

In August 2010, TPx purchased Sacramento-based 01 Communications Inc's retail customer business as well as its downtown Sacramento data center. In December 2010, TPx announced the purchase of Covad Wireless, also known as NextWeb, Inc., from MegaPath, allowing TelePacific to offer more services to enterprise customers in California and Nevada.
