= Yieldmo =

American advertising technology company

- Type: Private
- Industry: Online advertising, Digital marketing
- Founded: June 2012
- Founder: Mike Yavonditte, Rick Eaton, Teddy Jawde, Todd Coleman
- Headquarters: Nashua, NH
- Key people: Duc Chau (CTO); Jennifer Werner (CRO); Lisa Bradner (CSO); Lindsey DiGiorgio (CMO); Holly Danko (SVP, People); Dan Contento (SVP, Global Platform Development); Stephen Cutbill (SVP, Europe)
- Website: yieldmo.com

Yieldmo is an online advertising technology company based in New York City.‍ Mike Yavonditte, Rick Eaton, Teddy Jawde, and Todd Coleman founded Yieldmo in 2012. Yavonditte is the company's CEO.‍

== History ==
Michael Yavonditte, Teddy Jawde, Todd Coleman, and Rick Eaton founded Yieldmo in 2012. Yieldmo is a technology company focused on advertising. The founding team also built Quigo Technologies, a contextual ad network, which was acquired by AOL in 2007 for $363 million.‍

Yieldmo announced its Series C funding led by Time Warner Investments in October 2014. Additional investors included Google Ventures, Union Square Ventures and Genacast Ventures.‍ The funding round brought the company's total funding to $22.1 million.‍ In December 2014, Bloomberg listed Yieldmo in their Machine Intelligence Landscape report.‍ In January 2015, Ad Exchanger listed Yieldmo's Hyperscroller as one of the most innovative mobile ad formats of 2014.‍ Also in 2015, Yieldmo became the first mobile network to run comScore's Media Metrix for its mobile ad network rankings.‍ In 2015, Yieldmo delivered ad impressions to 105 million smartphones.‍ Yieldmo was listed among Deloitte's "Technology Fast 500" in 2017 and 2018.‍ Yieldmo was also listed among Crain's "Best Places to Work in NYC in 2020".‍
