= USS Dandelion =

History

United States
- Ordered: as Antietam
- Laid down: date unknown
- Launched: 1862
- Acquired: 21 November 1862
- In service: 12 December 1862
- Out of service: 14 July 1865
- Stricken: 1865 (est.)
- Fate: Sold 15 August 1865

General characteristics
- Displacement: 100 tons (est.)
- Length: 90 ft (27 m)
- Beam: 19 ft (5.8 m)
- Draught: 7 ft 6 in (2.29 m)
- Propulsion: steam engine
- Speed: 19 k
- Complement: 21
- Armament: two 12-pounder howitzers

USS Dandelion was a steam tugboat used by the Union Navy during the American Civil War. In addition to towing, she was used by the Navy to patrol navigable waterways of the Confederacy to prevent the South from trading with other countries.

Dandelion, a steam tug, was built as Antietam in 1862 by Winson and Co., Philadelphia, Pennsylvania; purchased by the Navy 21 November 1862; renamed Dandelion; and outfitted at Philadelphia Navy Yard.

== Assigned to the South Atlantic Blockade ==
Commanded by Acting Master C. Folsom, Dandelion sailed from Philadelphia 12 December 1862 for duty with the South Atlantic Blockading Squadron, arriving at Port Royal, South Carolina, 4 days later. She served as a tug in the coastal and inland waters of South Carolina, U.S. state of Georgia, and Florida until the end of hostilities.

== Supporting attacks on Confederate forts ==
On 3 March 1863 site took part in an engagement between Union ships and Fort McAllister, and on 8 April she rescued the crew of Keokuk which sank off Morris Island near Charleston, South Carolina. During 9 and 10 July 1863 she towed into Folly River, South Carolina, the boats of an expedition which captured Morris Island. She participated in the attacks on Fort Wagner, South Carolina, on 24 July and 17 August, and from 7 to 21 February 1864 accompanied an expedition up St. Johns River, Florida.

== End-of-war decommissioning and sale ==
Dandelion sailed from Charleston 2 July 1865 and arrived at New York a week later. She was decommissioned there 14 July 1865, and sold 15 August 1865.
