= Hart v. Comcast Corp. =

Suit filed against Comcast in Alameda County

Hart v. Comcast was a suit filed by Jon Hart, a citizen of California against Comcast in Alameda County. Comcast is a provider of internet access and services. The suit alleged that Comcast was illegally interfering with certain types of internet traffic, such as BitTorrent. The suit alleged that Comcast is guilty of false advertising for advertising high speed services yet deliberately using technology to interfere with access speeds. The suit also claimed Comcast's actions violated established Federal Communications Commission policies on Net Neutrality. The case has since been settled out of court.

The suit states:

Defendants have disseminated and continues to disseminate advertising, that they know or should reasonably know is false and misleading. This conduct includes, but is not limited to, promoting and advertising the fast speeds that apply to the Service without limitation, when, in fact, Defendants severely limit the speed of the Service for certain applications. It further includes Defendant's misrepresentations that their customers will enjoy "unfettered access" to all internet applications, when, in fact, Defendants not only fetter certain applications, but completely block them. Defendants know or reasonably should know that this advertising is false and misleading.

Hart has requested that the suit be declared a class action suit so that all Comcast customers in California can receive damages under the suit.

== Comcast High-speed internet service ==
Comcast, the largest cable provider in the United States, offers downstream speeds of up to 4, 6, 8, or 17.6 Mbit/s and upstream speeds of 384 kbit/s (48 kB/s), or 768 kbit/s (96 kB/s) for the 8 Mbit/s downstream package, for standard home connections.

According to the Comcast High Speed Internet terms of service, customers are provided with dynamic IP addresses. Despite the general expectation that Comcast's service is unlimited, Comcast has a policy of terminating broadband customers who allegedly use excessive bandwidth. Comcast has declined to disclose a numerical bandwidth limit, arguing that the limit is variable on a monthly basis and dependent on the capacity of specific cable nodes. Comcast claims this policy only affects users whose bandwidth consumption is among the top one percent of high-speed internet customers. Statements issued by Comcast in response to press inquiries suggest that excessive usage is generally defined as several hundred gigabytes per month. However, their terms of service state that a customer's use should not "represent (in the sole judgment of Comcast) an overly large burden on the network."

Comcast has implemented traffic shaping measures using Sandvine hardware which sends forged RST packets, disrupting the BitTorrent protocol. This has prevented some Comcast users from uploading, or "seeding" files they have downloaded via BitTorrent. Some Comcast users also may experience packet loss and latency, resulting in lag. This effect is most often noticed when dealing with time critical traffic in online gaming, and especially pronounced when such users host online games on ad-hoc networks (such as in Halo 3). This practice is becoming an increasingly common trend. The effects of packet loss and latency vary greatly depending on locale and the conditions of the local plant. Some Comcast customers may experience severe packet loss, while others may see no packet loss. The issues resulting from local variables affect all Internet Service Providers.

=== Blocking Internet Access ===
The Associated Press confirmed a story by TorrentFreak that indicates that Comcast "actively interferes with attempts by some of its high-speed Internet subscribers to share files online, a move that runs counter to the tradition of treating all types of Net traffic equally." Legal controversy ensued when Comcast terminated BitTorrent connections by sending forged RST packets represented as coming from the end users rather than from Comcast. This was through a partnership with Sandvine. This effectively blocks the user from making full use of BitTorrent. The controversy arises because Comcast is impersonating end users in terminating connections. Recently, a few Comcast users claimed to find temporary solutions for both Microsoft Windows and Linux systems by using a firewall to filter RST packets. This however was later revealed to be futile as it would have to be implemented on both ends—if the other end did not ignore the spoofed RST packet, the connection would be severed on the remote end. Now there is also evidence of Comcast using RST packets on groupware applications that have nothing to do with file sharing. Kevin Kanarski, who works as a Lotus Notes messaging engineer, noticed some strange behavior with Lotus Notes dropping emails when hooked up to a Comcast connection and has managed to verify that Comcast's reset packets are the culprit. A lawsuit, Hart v. Comcast, has been filed accusing Comcast of false advertising and other unfair trade practices.

Comcast customers have also reported a sporadic inability to use Google because forged RST packets are also interfering with HTTP access to google.com, which has further angered users.

== Outcome ==
Comcast agreed to settle the case by setting up a 16 Million dollar compensation fund. Each affected subscriber was entitled to $16.
