= Dandelion (crayon color) =

1990 crayon color

Dandelion (crayon)
- Dandelion crayon as it appeared from 1990 to 2004

Color coordinates
- Hex triplet: #FED85D
- sRGB^{B} (r, g, b): (254, 216, 93)
- HSV (h, s, v): (46°, 63%, 100%)
- CIELCh_{uv} (L, C, h): (87, 82, 67°)
- Source: Crayola
- B: Normalized to [0–255] (byte)

Dandelion (traditional)

Color coordinates
- Hex triplet: #F0FF28
- sRGB^{B} (r, g, b): (240, 255, 40)
- HSV (h, s, v): (64°, 84%, 100%)
- CIELCh_{uv} (L, C, h): (96, 104, 91°)
- Source: Maerz and Paul
- B: Normalized to [0–255] (byte)

Dandelion crayon swatch

Dandelion is a Crayola crayon color introduced in 1990, replacing the standard "orange-yellow" as part of Crayola's first ever color replacements. It was dropped from Crayola's range in 2017, but reintroduced in 2025 as a limited edition and was officially brought back in future 24 count and 64 count Crayola packs as of late February 2026.

An early recorded use of dandelion as a color name in English was in 1919.

== Retirement ==
Although many other colors had been retired before, Dandelion was the first color to be removed from the box set in the 114 years since Crayola's establishment. Crayola wanted space to add a blue crayon (Now called Bluetiful) inspired by the newly discovered YInMn Blue pigment to their 24 pack, which was announced at and had an event in Times Square livestreamed on Facebook, on March 31, 2017.

Reactions to the removal and replacement of Dandelion were mixed. Nicole Gallucci of Mashable felt that despite the science behind the new color, it was generic and not worth losing Dandelion for.

== Re-release ==
On February 5, 2025, Crayola announced they were bringing back ten of their popular retired crayon colors in a "retired-colors pack", including dandelion, blizzard blue, and magic mint and many more as a limited-edition release. They are also releasing the same colors in colored pencil and marker form. According to Crayola's chief marketing officer, Victoria Lozano, this is the first time in the company's history that it is bringing back a color. The packs were made available to the public on March 23, 2025. In early 2026 Crayola announced Dandelion would be returning to the 64 pack of crayons to stay. Social media attention has accelerated the return of colors, such as Dandelion.
