= Comcast Business =

Business communications division of Comcast

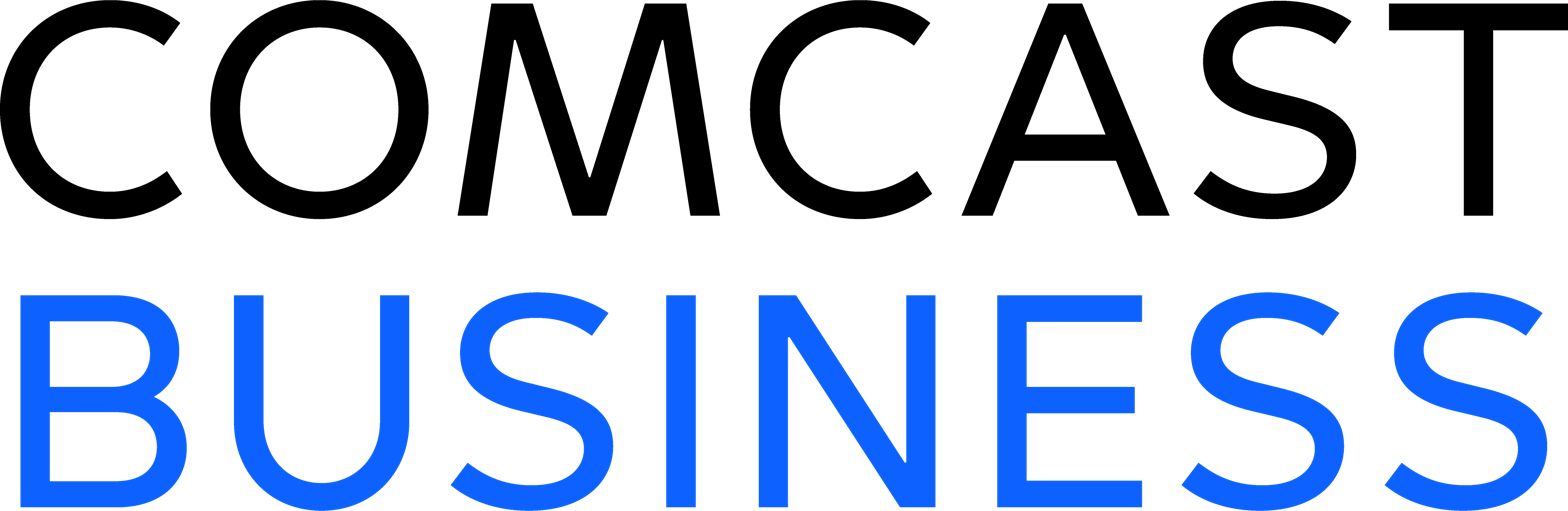
- Type: Subsidiary
- Industry: Telecommunications
- Founded: August 7, 2006; 20 years ago
- Headquarters: Philadelphia, Pennsylvania, United States
- Key people: Bill Stemper (president)
- Services: Internet, phone, and Ethernet
- Parent: Comcast
- Subsidiaries: Blueface
- Website: business.comcast.com

Comcast Business is a subsidiary of Comcast, which, through several iterations, has handled the sales, marketing, and delivery of internet, phone, and cable television to businesses (in contrast, consumer services are primarily offered under the Xfinity brand). In 2012, Comcast Business grew by 34%, the fastest growth of any of Comcast's products in 2012, reaching $2.4 billion in revenue. In 2013, Comcast Business generated $3.2 billion in revenue, an increase of 26% over 2012 revenue.

== History ==
=== Comcast Commercial Online ===
On December 3, 1997, Comcast's subsidiary, Comcast Commercial Online Communications Inc., launched the Comcast Commercial Internet Service, offering internet services to businesses through a cable modem, with data sent over the @Home Network. On January 24, 2000, Comcast Commercial Online announced a partnership with click2send.com (TM), Inc. The stock of the @Home Network collapsed during the mid-2000 dot-com bubble, bankrupting @Home, and Comcast moved subscribers to their own network instead of selling though a third party.

=== Comcast Telecommunications ===
In January 1998, Comcast acquired GlobalCom Telecommunications, Inc., re-branding it Comcast Telecommunications, Inc. As of 1998, Comcast Telecommunications offered Businesses phone service of several kinds, and worked with Comcast Commercial to sell internet services.

=== Comcast Business Communications ===
Following the burst of the dot com bubble, Comcast launched Comcast Business Communications LLC, folding three smaller business subsidiaries into the company, and offering Comcast Commercial Internet Service 2.0. On September 14, 2000, Comcast Business Communications received a $6.5 million grant from the New Jersey Business Employment Incentive program, through the New Jersey Economic Development Authority. Comcast Business Communications is based in Moorestown, New Jersey. In 2001, Comcast had launched Comcast Business Communications in Baltimore, and planned to spend about $250 million to launch CBC into a total of eight markets. After about year as the vice president of CBC, Comcast named Bill M. Keane the president of CBC on March 29, 2001. By December 2002, he had left Comcast for Cavalier Telephone.

== Products and services ==
A Comcast Business service van, Denver, CO

On August 7, 2006, Bill Stemper was named president of Comcast Business Services, taking over management of existing business products. The division initially focused on expanding on small business offerings.

By 2010, the company's investment in "massive amounts of fiber" for its cable television operations enabled it to include medium-sized businesses of 20 to 250 employees. By February 2011, Comcast Business began its rollout of metro Ethernet for large businesses, and in March 2011, Comcast Business launched its business telephone service called Comcast Business Class Trunk Service, and completed its initial rollout of metro Ethernet in May 2011, providing services for large businesses to 25 markets. Comcast Business expanded market presence throughout 2011, and continues to expand as of 2013. By 2012, the Business Services division had the highest growth rate of any of Comcast's services. The division's revenue has increased every year since 2006, when the division's earnings were $265 million. By 2013, Comcast Business had become the largest business-facing enterprise, by revenue, of all cable providers who provide services to businesses. Comcast Business generated $3.24 billion in 2013, an increase of 26.4% from 2012, when the revenue of Comcast Business was about $2.4 billion.

Initially, Comcast Business targeted businesses with 20 employees or less, such as florists, dry cleaners, and bakeries, but with continued expansion, Comcast Business is now able to serve medium-sized businesses such as clinics, hotels and the hospitality industry, as well as large organizations such as the Boston Ballet, and sports arenas, including arenas for the Boston Celtics, the Boston Red Sox, the Denver Broncos, the Philadelphia Phillies, the Washington Nationals, the Oakland A's, and the Detroit Tigers. In February 2014, Comcast Business was recognized as the fastest growing company based on 2013 carrier Ethernet provisions.

In 2013, Stemper was given a Vanguard Award from the National Cable & Telecommunications Association in the "operations and management" category. In February 2013, the Metro Ethernet Forum announced that Comcast Business was the first carrier Ethernet provider to be certified CE 2.0 compliant. In November 2013, Comcast Business was awarded Service Provider of the Year award by the Metro Ethernet Forum, in addition to Best Carrier Ethernet Business Application for its deployment with the Denver Broncos, and for Best Marketing. According to a mid-year 2014 leaderboard report on Ethernet by Vertical Systems Group, Comcast Business grew more than any other U.S. provider, rising to sixth place (from eighth). Comcast Business won four of Metro Ethernet Forum's "Ethernet Excellence Awards", presented on November 19, 2014, at the annual Global Ethernet Networking conference in Washington DC. Comcast Business president Bill Stemper was awarded Ethernet Industry Person of the Year, and Comcast Business received two awards for Best Application of the Year for government and health applications, and Best Service of the Year for North America.

In 2020, Comcast bought Irish telecommunications company Blueface founded by Feargal Brady and Aaron Clauson in 2004 to challenge the status quo of telecommunications and provide innovation in communications. . Bill Stemper, the president of Comcast Business, said buying Blueface would give his division's customers "access to industry-leading audio and video tools to connect employees across devices and locations".

=== High-speed Internet ===
Comcast's business Internet plans are similar to their residential plans, with slightly different speed offerings and prices. Notably, the main difference between Comcast's residential Internet and Business Internet is the lack of a monthly data cap with the business plans. In addition to their standard DOCSIS service, Comcast also offers SD-WAN via Comcast Business ActiveCore, and Carrier Ethernet services for businesses, which provide symmetric download & upload links with speeds ranging from 2 Mbit/s to 10 Gbit/s, in select cities.

== See also ==
- List of multiple-system operators
