= Dandelion Energy =

Geothermal heating company

Dandelion Energy, Inc.
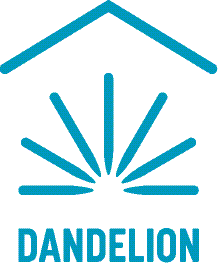
- Type: Private
- Industry: Geothermal heating
- Founded: 2017; 9 years ago
- Headquarters: Mount Kisco, New York, U.S.
- Area served: New York, Connecticut, Massachusetts, southern Vermont
- Parent: X (until 2017)
- Website: dandelionenergy.com

Dandelion is an American geothermal heating supplier in the Northeastern United States. Prior to 2017, the company was part of Google X, before turning into an independent company. Dandelion targets providing geothermal heating and cooling (HVAC).

The system consists of a heat pump that pipes energy to or from a house. In February 2019, Dandelion raised 16 million in a series A fundraising round.

Dandelion's CEO, Kathy Hannun, was named one of Fast Company's most creative people in 2018.

In June 2018, Dandelion began the installation of the first sub-$20,000 geothermal heat pump, Dandelion Air. The product was designed in-house by the company, which is installed in the backyard of a residential property and is currently financed over a 20-year term.

In September 2020, Dandelion announced its expansion to Connecticut.
