= Comcast =

American multinational telecommunications and media conglomerate

Coordinates: 39.9545°N 75.1685°W

Comcast Corporation

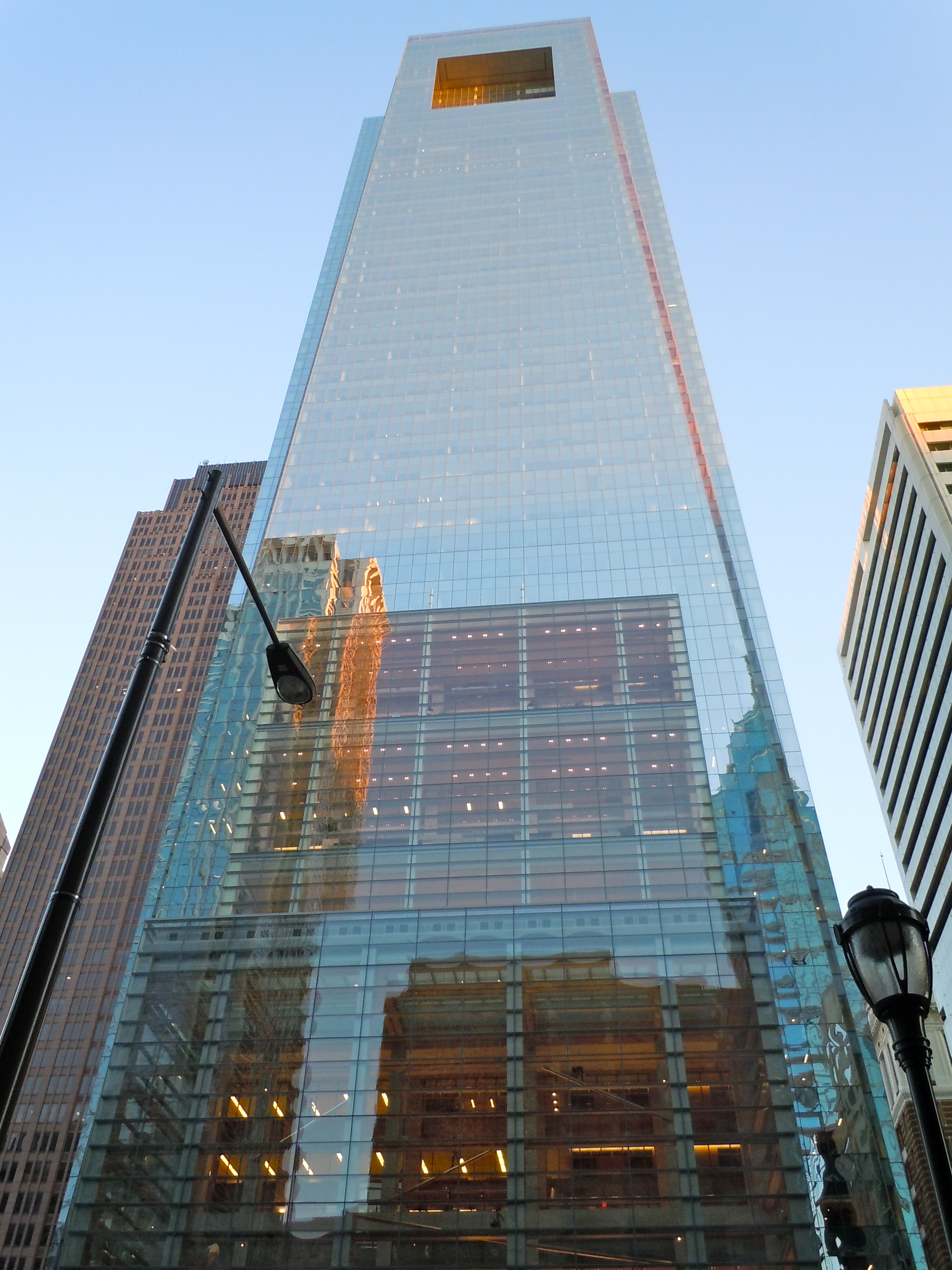
- Comcast Center, the company's headquarters in Philadelphia
- Formerly: American Cable Systems (1963–1969); Comcast Holdings (1969–2001)
- Type: Public
- Traded as: Nasdaq: CMCSA (Class A); Nasdaq-100 component; S&P 100 component; S&P 500 component
- Industry: Telecommunications; Media; Entertainment
- Predecessors: AT&T Broadband; MediaOne
- Founded: June 28, 1963; 63 years ago in Tupelo, Mississippi, U.S.
- Founders: Ralph J. Roberts; Julian A. Brodsky; Daniel Aaron
- Headquarters: Comcast Center, Philadelphia, Pennsylvania, United States
- Area served: Worldwide
- Key people: Brian L. Roberts (chairman & co-CEO); Michael J. Cavanagh (co-CEO); Jason S. Armstrong (CFO)
- Products: Cable television; Broadband; Internet service; Broadcasting
- Revenue: ▼US$123.7 billion (2025)
- Operating income: ▼US$20.7 billion (2025)
- Net income: ▲US$20 billion (2025)
- Total assets: ▲US$272.6 billion (2025)
- Total equity: ▲US$96.9 billion (2025)
- Owner: Brian L. Roberts (1% equity interest, 33% voting power)
- Number of employees: 179,000 (2025)
- Divisions: Connectivity & Platforms; Content & Experiences
- Subsidiaries: Xfinity; NBCUniversal; Sky Group; Comcast Business; Comcast Spectacor; Midco (49%)
- ASN: 7922
- Website: corporate.comcast.com

Comcast Corporation (Note: Before the AT&T merger in 2001, the parent company was Comcast Holdings Corporation. Comcast Holdings Corporation now refers to a subsidiary of Comcast Corporation, not the parent company (see: Bloomberg profile on Comcast Holdings Corporation). Technically, the current parent company was founded December 7, 2001, as CAB Holdings Corporation, which changed its name to AT&T Comcast Corporation before finally taking on the Comcast Corporation name (see: Nov 2002 8K/A Form and Nov 2002 S-4).) is an American multinational mass media, telecommunications, and entertainment conglomerate. Comcast's corporate headquarters is at the Comcast Center in Philadelphia, while NBCUniversal, Comcast's New York operations and other major Comcast assets are headquartered at 30 Rockefeller Plaza in Midtown Manhattan in New York City. The company was ranked 51st in the Forbes Global 2000 in 2023. It is the fourth-largest telecommunications company by worldwide revenue, after AT&T, Verizon, and China Mobile. Comcast is the third-largest pay-TV company, the second-largest cable TV company by subscribers, and the largest home Internet service provider in the United States.

It owns and operates the Xfinity residential cable communications business segment and division; Comcast Business, a commercial services provider; and Xfinity Mobile, an MVNO of Verizon. The company is also the nation's third-largest home telephone service provider, serving residential and commercial customers in 40 states and the District of Columbia.

Comcast has owned NBCUniversal and its various mass media subsidiaries since 2013. It is a high-volume producer of films for theatrical exhibition and television programming through its film studios: Universal Pictures, DreamWorks Animation, Illumination, and Focus Features. Its over-the-air national broadcast network channels include the National Broadcasting Company (NBC, one of America's Big Three television networks), Spanish-language channels Telemundo, TeleXitos, and Universo, television stations like Cozi TV, and pay-TV channel Bravo. NBCUniversal also works in news (NBC News and Noticias Telemundo) and sports (NBC Sports, NBCSN and Telemundo Deportes), bolstered by its 1996 acquisition of professional sports company Spectacor. It owns the video-on-demand streaming service Peacock; its holdings in digital distribution include thePlatform, acquired in 2006; and ad-tech company FreeWheel, acquired in 2014. Comcast has been the parent company of Sky Group since 2018, when it dropped out of the running to buy 21st Century Fox, Sky's then-largest shareholder, and instead acquired the company from Fox and other shareholders. The company also operates theme parks under its Universal Destinations & Experiences subsidiary.

Comcast announced plans on June 29, 2026, to separate NBCUniversal and Sky into an independent publicly traded company through a tax-free spin-off. The proposed transaction would leave Comcast focused on connectivity and technology services, while the new company would contain its media and entertainment businesses. Completion is expected in summer 2027, subject to required approvals and other conditions.

Comcast is criticized and put under intense public scrutiny for a variety of reasons. Its customer satisfaction ratings were among the lowest in the cable industry from 2008 to 2010. It has violated net neutrality practices; it has offered a commitment to a narrow definition of net neutrality that critics say ignores the difference between Comcast's private network services and the rest of the Internet. Critics also note a lack of competition in the vast majority of Comcast's service areas; in particular, the limited competition among cable providers. Given its negotiating power as a large ISP, some suspect that it could use paid peering agreements to unfairly influence end-user connection speeds. Comcast's ownership of both content production (in NBCUniversal) and distribution (as an ISP) has raised antitrust concerns that scuttled the company's 2014 effort to acquire Time Warner Cable. Comcast was dubbed "The Worst Company in America" by The Consumerist in 2010 and 2014.

== History ==
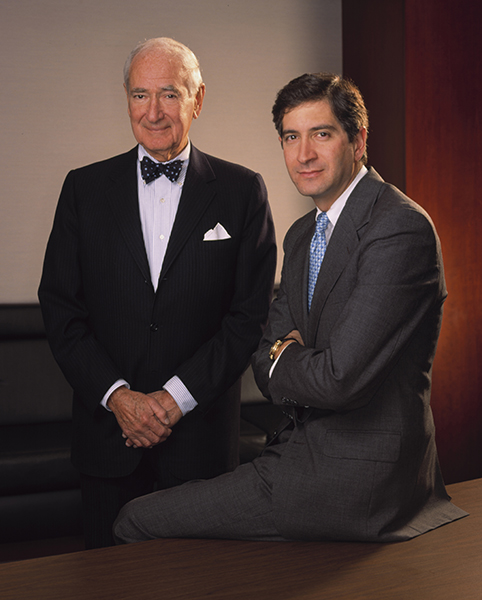
Ralph J. Roberts, founder of Comcast, with his son Brian L. Roberts, at their Philadelphia headquarters in 1999

=== American Cable Systems ===
In 1963, Ralph J. Roberts in conjunction with his two business partners, Daniel Aaron and Julian A. Brodsky, purchased American Cable Systems as a corporate spin-off from its parent, Jerrold Electronics, for U.S. $500,000. At the time, American Cable was a small cable operator in Tupelo, Mississippi, with five channels and 12,000 customers. In 1965, American Cable Systems purchased Storecast Corporation of America, a product placement supermarket specialist marketing firm. In 1968, American Cable Systems purchased its first franchise of Muzak, a brand of background music played in retail stores. Storecast was a client of Muzak.

=== Comcast ===
Comcast's first logo from 1969 to 2000

The company was re-incorporated in Pennsylvania on March 5, 1969, under the new name Comcast Corporation. Comcast's initial public offering occurred on June 29, 1972, on the National Association of Securities Dealers Automated Quotation System (NASDAQ), a then-recently established stock exchange, with a market capitalization of U.S. $3,010,000. In 1977, HBO was first launched on a Comcast system with 20,000 customers in western Pennsylvania with a five-night free preview getting a 15% sign up rate. In 1986, Comcast bought 26% of Group W Cable, a broadcast company, doubling its number of subscribers to 1 million. Also that year, Comcast made a founding investment of $380 million in QVC. In 1988, Comcast was able to buy a 50% share of SCI Holdings in a joint deal with Tele-Communications Inc. Comcast also acquired American Cellular Network Corporation in 1988 for $230 million, marking the first time it became a mobile phone operator.

=== Increasing market share (1990–2001) ===
In February 1990, Ralph Roberts' son, Brian L. Roberts, succeeded his father as president of Comcast. Ralph Roberts established The Comcast Fund, a foundation that supports innovative ideas and research in technology and public policy. Daniel Aaron retired, although he remained on the company's board. Two years later, the company's mobile division, Comcast Cellular, purchased a controlling interest in Metromedia's Philadelphia-area cellular telephone interests, Metrophone. By 1994, Comcast owned 50% stock in the cable communications company Garden State Cable, who by that year were serving approximately 195,000 subscribers. That same year, Comcast became the third-largest cable operator in the United States, with around 3.5 million subscribers following its purchase of Maclean-Hunter's American division for $1.27 billion. Comcast grew to 4.3 million subscribers the following year with the purchase of the cable operation of E. W. Scripps Company for $1.575 billion in stock.

Comcast offered internet connection for the first time in 1996, with its part in the launch of the @Home Network. Also in 1996, Comcast formed Comcast Spectacor, which became owner of the Philadelphia Flyers. In 1997, Microsoft invested $1 billion in Comcast, and the company launched its digital television service. That same year, in partnership with The Walt Disney Company, Comcast got a 50.1% controlling interest in E! Entertainment. By December 31, 1997, it was available in the Philadelphia, Detroit, Baltimore, Orange County, California, Sarasota and Union, New Jersey areas.

Comcast's cable acquisitions in 1997 were Jones Intercable, Inc. with 1 million customers, and a stake in Prime Communications with 430,000 subscribers. In February 1998, Comcast sold its U.K. division to NTL for US$600 million, along with the division's $397 million in debt. In 1999, Comcast sold Comcast Cellular to SBC Communications for $400 million, releasing it from $1.27 billion in debt. Also in 1999, Comcast acquired Greater Philadelphia Cablevision, and launched Comcast University as well as Comcast Interactive Capital Group.

In November 1999, Comcast purchased Lenfest Communications, who were the ninth largest cable television operator at the time and were the largest operator in the Philadelphia area. This consolidated Comcast's control over all of the Philadelphia region, and earned it approximately 1.3 million additional cable subscribers. The purchase of Lenfest also bought Comcast the remaining 50% stock of the cable operator Garden State Communications — a company whom Comcast had already owned half of in partnership with Lenfest for years. Comcast quickly replaced the ten-year general manager at Garden State with their own executive, and eventually Garden State ceased operating under its own name and was fully merged to become a part of the Comcast Corporation.

=== Largest American cable provider (2001–present) ===
Proposed merger name logo, 2001

In 2001, Comcast announced it would acquire the assets of the largest cable television operator at the time, AT&T Broadband, for $44.5 billion. The proposed name for the merged company was "AT&T Comcast", but the companies ultimately decided to keep only the Comcast name, with the company and new assets reincorporated in Pennsylvania on December 7, 2001. On November 18, 2002, Comcast officially acquired all assets of AT&T Broadband, thus making Comcast the largest cable television company in the United States with over 22 million subscribers. This spurred the start of Comcast Advertising Sales (using AT&T's groundwork) which would later be renamed Comcast Spotlight, then Effectv, A Comcast Company and is now known as Comcast Advertising. As part of this acquisition, Comcast also acquired the National Digital Television Center in Centennial, Colorado as a wholly owned subsidiary, now known as the Comcast Media Center. In 2003, Comcast became one of the original investors in The Golf Channel. After Excite@Home went bankrupt in October 2001, Comcast took over providing internet directly to consumers in January 2002.

Comcast's second logo introduced on December 12, 1999; used from 2000 until 2006.

On February 11, 2004, Comcast announced a $54 billion bid for Disney, including taking on $12 billion of Disney's debt. The deal would have made Comcast the largest media conglomerate in the world. However, after rejection by Disney and uncertain response from investors, the bid was abandoned in April. In 2004, Comcast sold its QVC shares to Liberty Media for $7.9 billion.

Comcast's third logo from 2006 until December 31, 2012.

On April 8, 2005, a partnership led by Comcast and Sony Pictures Entertainment finalized a deal to acquire MGM and its affiliate studio, United Artists, and created an additional outlet to carry MGM/UA's material for cable and Internet distribution. On October 31, 2005, Comcast officially announced that it had acquired Susquehanna Communications, a South Central Pennsylvania-based cable television and broadband services provider and unit of the former Susquehanna Pfaltzgraff company, for $775 million cash. Comcast previously owned approximately 30% of Susquehanna Communications through its affiliate company, Lenfest. In December 2005, Comcast announced the creation of Comcast Interactive Media, a new division focused on online media.

In July 2006, Comcast purchased the Seattle-based software company thePlatform. This represented an entry into a new line of business—selling software to allow companies to manage their Internet (and IP-based) media publishing efforts.

On April 3, 2007, Comcast announced it would acquire the cable systems owned and operated by Patriot Media, a privately held company owned by cable veteran Steven J. Simmons, Spectrum Equity Investors and Spire Capital, that served approximately 81,000 video subscribers for $483 million.

Comcast announced in May 2007 and launched in September 2008 a dashboard called SmartZone that allowed users to perform mobile functions online. There was also Cloudmark spam and phishing protection and Trend Micro antivirus. The address book is Comcast Plaxo software.

In May 2008, Comcast purchased Plaxo for a reported $150 million to $170 million.

Comcast won the Consumerist Worst Company In America ("Golden Poo") award in 2010. A gold trophy in the shape of a pile of human feces was delivered to Comcast Corporate Headquarters to commemorate the unmatched level of enmity flowing from its customer base to its business. Comcast responded immediately by publicly acknowledging the dubious award and citing ongoing efforts to improve its customer service. One effort to change this is a new app called Tech ETA that allows customers to see exactly when a technician is coming.

On 21 May 2024, Comcast announced Xfinity StreamSaver™, a streaming bundle combining Peacock, Netflix, and Apple TV+ for Xfinity Internet and TV customers. This bundle offered a subscription to Netflix Standard with ads, Peacock Premium, and Apple TV+, promising over 30% savings or nearly $100 annually.

==== Adelphia purchase ====
In April 2005, Comcast and Time Warner Cable announced plans to buy the assets of bankrupted Adelphia Cable. The two companies paid a total of $17.6 billion in the deal that was finalized in the second quarter of 2006—after the U.S. Federal Communications Commission (FCC) completed a seven-month investigation without raising an objection. Time Warner Cable became the second-largest cable provider in the U.S., ranking behind Comcast. As part of the deal, Time Warner Cable and Comcast traded existing subscribers in order to consolidate them into larger geographic clusters.

In August 2006, Comcast and Time Warner Cable dissolved a 50/50 partnership that controlled the systems in the Houston, Southwest Texas, San Antonio, and Kansas City markets under the Time Warner Cable brand. After the dissolution, Comcast obtained the Houston system, and Time Warner retained the others. On January 1, 2007, Comcast officially took control of the Houston system but continued to operate under the Time Warner Cable brand until June 19, 2007.

==== Strata ====
Comcast acquired Strata Marketing Inc. in 2005.The company that became Strata was founded in 1983 by Roger Skolnik, PhD, an adjunct professor at the University of Illinois at Chicago. Skolnik had been national program director for Westinghouse Broadcasting (Group W), based at WIND (AM) Chicago, before moving to WRIF Detroit and ABC-owned WDAI (now WLS-FM) in Chicago. These experiences led him to develop methods for analyzing radio audience information and making it available for both sales and programming. To develop and market software tools for these methods he launched Media Service Concepts. Skolnik's first MSC product was Radio RECALL, programmed by Kevin Killion (whose Stone House Systems, Inc. later created the TView television planning system). Renamed as Strata Marketing, the company originally developed tools for radio stations to use in interpreting and understanding Arbitron radio surveys. Skolnik continued to guide Strata until his death in 1994.

==== NBCUniversal ====
NBCUniversal logo since January 5, 2026.

Media outlets began reporting on October 1, 2009, that Comcast was in talks to buy NBC Universal. Comcast denied the rumors at first, while NBC would not comment on them. However, CNBC itself reported on October 1 that General Electric was considering spinning NBC Universal off into a separate company that would merge the NBC television network and its cable properties such as USA Network, Syfy and MSNBC, as well as Universal Pictures, with Comcast's content assets. GE would maintain 49% control of the new company, while Comcast owned 51%. Vivendi, which owned 20%, would have to sell its stake to GE. It was reported that under the current deal with GE that it would happen in November or December. It was also reported that Time Warner would be interested in placing a bid, until CEO Jeffrey L. Bewkes directly denied interest, leaving Comcast the sole bidder. On November 1, 2009, The New York Times reported Comcast had moved closer to a deal to purchase NBC Universal and that a formal announcement could be made sometime the following week.

Logo used from January 1, 2013, to January 10, 2024.

Following a tentative agreement on December 1, the parties announced that Comcast would buy a controlling 51% stake in NBC Universal, including Universal Pictures, for $6.5 billion in cash and $7.3 billion in programming on December 3. GE would take over the remaining 49% stake in NBC Universal, using $5.8 billion to buy out Vivendi's 20% minority stake in NBC Universal. On January 18, 2011, the FCC approved the deal by a vote of 4 to 1. The transaction was completed on January 28, 2011. In December 2012, Comcast adopted a new corporate logo, which incorporates NBC's peacock logo to signify its ownership of the broadcaster. On February 12, 2013, Comcast announced that it would acquire the remaining 49% of General Electric's interest in NBCUniversal, in a deal valued at approximately $16.7 billion. The acquisition was completed on March 19, 2013.

Comcast reported that third-quarter net profits in 2020 fell 37% to $2.02 billion from $3.22 billion the previous year, in part due to the limited capacity measures for the COVID-19 pandemic at theme parks like Universal Studios and movie theaters, with revenues falling 4.8%. With its theme park in California being closed since March 2020 and limited capacity at locations in Florida and Japan, the company was prompted to lay off a number of its employees; revenue for its theme park locations fell 81% to $311 million from $1.63 billion in 2019. In 2024, Comcast signed a deal with Starlink to provide satellite-based connectivity to business customers in regions with limited network access.

==== Attempted acquisition of Time Warner Cable ====
On February 12, 2014, the Los Angeles Times reported that Comcast sought to acquire Time Warner Cable in a deal valued at $45.2 billion. On February 13, it was reported that Time Warner Cable agreed to the acquisition. This was to add several metropolitan areas to the Comcast portfolio, such as New York City, Los Angeles, Dallas–Fort Worth, Cleveland, Columbus, Cincinnati, Charlotte, San Diego, and San Antonio. Time Warner Cable and Comcast aimed to merge into one company by the end of 2014, and both have praised the deal, emphasizing the increased capabilities of a combined telecommunications network, and to "create operating efficiencies and economies of scale".

In 2014, critics expressed concern that the deal would give Comcast greater negotiating power in a number of areas, including rebroadcast fees with television channels, and peering agreements with ISPs.

Critics noted in 2013 that Tom Wheeler, the head of the FCC, which has to approve the deal, is the former head of both the largest cable lobbying organization, the National Cable & Telecommunications Association, and as largest wireless lobby, CTIA – The Wireless Association. According to Politico, Comcast "donated to almost every member of Congress who has a hand in regulating it". The U.S. Senate Judiciary Committee held a hearing on the deal on April 9, 2014. The House Judiciary Committee planned its own hearing. On March 6, 2014, the United States Department of Justice Antitrust Division confirmed it was investigating the deal. In March 2014, the division's chairman, William Baer, recused himself because he was involved in the prior Comcast NBCUniversal acquisition. Several states' attorneys general have announced support for the federal investigation. On April 24, 2015, Jonathan Sallet, general counsel of the F.C.C., explained that he was going to recommend a hearing before an administrative law judge, equivalent to a collapse of the deal.

In August 2015, Comcast announced that it would increase Internet speeds for low-income customers from 5 Mbit/s to 10 Mbit/s, provide free wireless routers, and pilot an initiative to increase Internet access for low-income senior citizens. In September of that year, Comcast also launched Watchable, a YouTube competitor. The move was seen by Variety as an attempt to appeal to the cord-cutting market.

==== Acquisition of DreamWorks Animation ====
On April 26, 2016, The Wall Street Journal reported that Comcast was in talks to acquire DreamWorks Animation for more than $3 billion, following failed merger talks with Hasbro and SoftBank in 2014. Two days later on April 28, 2016, Comcast officially announced its NBCUniversal subsidiary would acquire DreamWorks Animation for a total of $3.8 billion. The acquisition was completed on August 22, 2016; DreamWorks Animation was integrated into Universal Filmed Entertainment as part of Universal Pictures. Universal took over distribution of DreamWorks Animation films beginning in 2019 with How to Train Your Dragon: The Hidden World after DreamWorks Animation's deal with 20th Century Fox expired, following the release of Captain Underpants: The First Epic Movie in 2017.

==== Cellular service ====
In September 2016, Comcast confirmed that it would launch an MVNO cellular network with Verizon Wireless. The service, described as being a "Wi-Fi and MVNO-integrated product" was expected to launch in mid-2017. The partnership and the addition of wireless would allow Comcast to offer a quadruple play of services. Including Comcast's Home Security offering, customers now have the option of a Quintuple Play. The service was officially announced on April 6, 2017, as Xfinity Mobile.

==== Attempted acquisition of 21st Century Fox ====
On November 16, 2017, it was reported that Comcast attempted to purchase 21st Century Fox, following the news 10 days earlier that Disney had negotiated with Fox to acquire the same assets. Like Disney, the deal included the 20th Century Fox film and television studios (Universal Pictures and Universal Television's respective rivals), cable entertainment and broadcast satellite networks including FX Networks, National Geographic Partners, Fox Sports Networks, and international channels such as Star India. It would not include the Fox Broadcasting Company, Fox Television Stations, Fox Sports, and Fox News units, all which will be spun-off into a new independent company, which is later known as the Fox Corporation since the 2019 launch.

However, on December 11, 2017, Comcast officially dropped the bid, saying that "We never got the level of engagement needed to make a definitive offer." On December 14, Disney officially confirmed its acquisition of 21st Century Fox for $52.4 billion in stock, pending review from the United States Department of Justice Antitrust Division.

On February 5, 2018, a new report by CNBC claims that despite the Disney/Fox deal, Comcast was considering topping Disney's $52.4 billion offer once the AT&T–Time Warner deal goes through, after the Department of Justice Antitrust Division sued to block it on November 20, 2017.

==== Acquisition of Sky ====
On February 27, 2018, Comcast offered to purchase a 61% stake in Sky plc at a value of £12.50 per-share, approximately £22.1 billion. 21st Century Fox, which owns a 39% stake in Sky, had previously declined a US$60 billion acquisition offer by Comcast in favor of its deal with Disney, due to anti-competition concerns. NBCUniversal CEO Steve Burke stated that purchasing Sky would roughly double its presence in English-speaking markets, and allow for synergies between the respective networks and studios of NBCUniversal and Sky. Fox stated that it "remains committed to its recommended cash offer for Sky", and that Comcast had not yet made a "firm offer".

On April 12, the Panel on Takeovers and Mergers ruled that Disney had to acquire all of Sky within 28 days of fully acquiring Fox if the latter's acquisition of Sky was not completed by the time the merger was done, or if Comcast's counteroffer was not accepted. On April 25, 2018, Comcast made its formal counter-bid for Sky plc, offering £12.50 per-share; Sky subsequently withdrew its recommendation of the Fox bid.

On May 7, 2018, Comcast announced a potential bid against Disney's effort to acquire Fox after it spoke to investment banks about making a $60 billion cash offer, pending on approval of the AT&T–Time Warner merger. Eight days later, several Fox investors expressed interests in signing a deal with Comcast due to its all-cash offer as opposed to Disney's $52.4 billion stock offer. Then on June 5, 2018, Culture Secretary Matt Hancock cleared both 21st Century Fox and Comcast's respective offers to acquire Sky plc. Fox's offer is contingent on the divestiture of Sky News. Eight days later, Comcast officially announced a $65 billion counter-offer to acquire the 21st Century Fox's assets that Disney offered to purchase.

On June 15, 2018, the European Commission gave antitrust clearance to Comcast's offer to purchase Sky, citing that in terms of its current assets in Europe, there would be limited impact on competition. Comcast included a 10-year commitment to the operations and funding of Sky News, similar to Disney's offer. On June 19, 2018, Disney formally agreed to acquire Sky News as part of Fox's proposed bid, with a 15-year commitment to increase its annual funding from £90 million to £100 million.

However, on June 20, 2018, Disney and Fox announced that they had amended their previous merger agreement, upping Disney's offer to $71.3 billion (a 10% premium over Comcast's $65 billion offer), while also offering shareholders the option of receiving cash instead of stock. On June 27, the United States Department of Justice gave antitrust approval to Disney under the condition of selling Fox's 22 regional sports channels, to which the company has agreed. On the next day, Disney and Fox shareholders scheduled July 27, 2018 as the day to vote on Fox's properties being sold to Disney, giving Comcast enough time to make a higher counter-offer for the Fox assets.

On July 11, 2018, 21st Century Fox raised its bid to purchase Sky plc assets to $32.5 billion, and $18.57 a share. In response, Comcast increased its bid to $34 billion, and $19.5 a share. At the same time, Fox was given clearance by the British government to purchase Sky. On July 18, 2018, Bloomberg reported that the Sky board scheduled July 27, 2018 as the day shareholders vote on selling Sky properties.

However, on July 12, 2018, the Department of Justice filed a notice of appeal with the D.C. Circuit to reverse the District Court's approval for AT&T's acquisition of Time Warner (then renamed WarnerMedia). Although analysts say that the chances of the DOJ win are small, they say it is the "final nail in the coffin for Comcast's Fox chase. This is a clear gift to Disney." On the next day, CEO of AT&T Randall Stephenson gave an interview with CNBC, about Comcast's bid for Fox: "It probably can't help it. You're in a situation where two entities are bidding for an asset, and this kind of action can obviously influence the outcome of those actions."

On July 16, 2018, CNBC reported that Comcast was unlikely to continue its bidding war to acquire Fox from Disney in favor of Sky. Three days later, Comcast officially announced that it was dropping its bid on the Fox assets in order to focus on its bid for Sky. CEO of Comcast, Brian L. Roberts, said: "I'd like to congratulate Bob Iger and the team at Disney and commend the Murdoch family and Fox for creating such a desirable and respected company." Eight days later, 21st Century Fox shareholders agreed to sell the majority of its assets to Disney for $71.3 billion. The sale covered the majority of 21CF's entertainment assets, including 20th Century Fox, FX Networks, and National Geographic Partners, among others.

On September 22, 2018, Comcast outbid 21st Century Fox by raising its bid for Sky plc to $40 billion, or $22.57 a share. On September 25, 2018, Comcast bought a 30% stake of Sky plc. The next day, on September 26, 2018, Fox, with the consent of its acquirer, sold its 39% stake to Comcast in exchange for $15 billion in cash. In October 2018 Comcast finally acquired the rest of the shares of Sky with the company being delisted by December of 2018. The merger was completed on November 7, 2018, when the company was delisted after becoming a wholly owned subsidiary and division of Comcast.

==== Later investments, spin-off of several NBCU assets ====
On June 20, 2022, Comcast acquired Levl, an American-Israeli startup that develops technology to authenticate wireless devices and help prevent hacking, for an estimated $50 million. Following the acquisition, Comcast announced it will set up its first development center in Israel.

In 2023, Comcast and Disney agreed that Comcast would sell its 33% stake to Hulu (the service has an audience of 48 million subscribers). The streaming service is valued at $27.5 billion in this deal. Part of the proceeds from this deal will be used to buy back Comcast shares.

On October 31, 2024, Mike Cavanagh announced on the company's 2024 third-quarter earnings call that it would consider a spin-off of its cable networks. On November 20 of that same year, the company announced that it had greenlit the spin-off. The entity would consist of NBCUniversal's US cable networks including USA Network, CNBC, MSNBC, Oxygen, E!, Syfy and Golf Channel alongside the company's digital portfolio such as Fandango, SportsEngine, Rotten Tomatoes and GolfNow. NBCUniversal would retain the NBC network, Telemundo, Bravo, Peacock, Hayu, the NBC Sports and NBC News divisions as well as NBCUniversal's filmed entertainment, television studios and theme park businesses. The separate entity, classified as a tax-free spin-off, was scheduled to be completed in 2025, pending regulatory approval. This coincided with the promotion of Donna Langley to head the Entertainment & Studios group while Matt Strauss being promoted to chairman as Mark Lazarus and Anand Kini plan to step down after the spin-off's completion to head the separate entity. On May 6, 2025, it was announced that the company would be referred to as "Versant". Versant announced it would rename MSNBC to MS NOW to remove the use of the NBC logo and name. In October 2025, both CNBC and MSNBC began the process of formally separating themselves from NBC News, effectively beginning Versant's operations as a subsidiary of Comcast until the spin-off was completed, which finished on January 2, 2026.

On April 2, 2025, Comcast acquired Nitel, network-as-a-service provider.

==== Attempted acquisitions ====
On October 2, 2025, CNBC reported that Comcast would be the biggest wild card for the acquisition of Warner Bros. Discovery's assets.

On November 6, 2025, it was reported that Comcast contracted Goldman Sachs and Morgan Stanley about a possible takeover of WBD's studio and streaming assets. On November 20, Comcast, as well as other companies like Paramount Skydance, and Netflix, officially submitted their bids for Warner Bros. Discovery, with both Comcast and Netflix bidding for its studio and streaming assets, and Paramount bidding for the entirety of WBD. According to CNBC, David Zaslav will announce whether to split the company in two or sell off the whole company to one of the potential buyers before the end of the year.

By December 2, 2025, Comcast submitted a bid to merge Warner Bros. with NBCUniversal, according to Bloomberg, while Netflix submitted a mostly cash offer. Under Comcast's proposal, Comcast would take control of the combined entity and Warner Bros. shareholders would receive a mix of cash and stock. Paramount also submitted a bid for Warner Bros. Discovery, a 100% cash offer backed by debt financing from Apollo and Middle Eastern sovereign-wealth funds.

On December 5, Netflix announced that they would be buying the Warner Bros. streaming and studio company for $72 billion after the split closes in the third quarter, valuing WBD at $82.7 billion. As part of the deal, Netflix will acquire the Warner Bros. film and television studios, HBO and their streaming service HBO Max (including their respective libraries and DC Entertainment/DC Studios but not the linear networks, which would still be from Discovery Global). Paramount would later launch a hostile takeover bid for the entirety of WBD three days later for an enterprise value of $108.4 billion, with Comcast dropping out of the bid for WBD's studio and streaming assets. At the UBS media conference on December 8, Mike Cavanagh admitted that Comcast's bid was "light on cash" compared to bids by Netflix and Paramount and that "we didn't expect that we had a high likelihood of prevailing with a deal that made sense to us."

On December 17, Bloomberg reported that Comcast launched a valuation bid for WBD's streaming and studios division at $81 billion at $35.43 per share.

On December 24, 2025, The Wrap reported that Paramount Skydance may try to merge with another studio, if its planned bid to acquire Warner Bros. Discovery fails (with the Netflix-WBD deal still going through), with The Wrap stating that some experts believe that Paramount Skydance may try to merge with NBCUniversal (in case they merge, they would have to sell CBS, due to the FCC regulation stating that there can't be a merger between two of the Big Four broadcasting networks) or acquiring Lionsgate, if its bid for WBD fails.

On February 16, 2026, it was reported that Comcast and Paramount Skydance may merge to bolster their streaming platforms Peacock and Paramount+, respectively.

==== Exit of first-run syndication ====
On March 13, 2026, Comcast announced that it had exited the first-run syndication business and that it had canceled Access Hollywood, The Steve Wilkos Show, Karamo and Access Live. Deadline Hollywood reported that the cancellations were likely informed by the recent announcement that Comcast announced the cancellation of The Kelly Clarkson Show on February 2, 2026. Other Comcast-owned programs such as Dateline, Chicago P.D., and the Law & Order franchise will remain in off-network syndication.

==== Exit of media and entertainment ====
Comcast announced on June 29, 2026, that it intended to spin off NBCUniversal and Sky into a separate publicly traded company. The planned company would include Universal's film and television studios, the NBC and Telemundo broadcast networks, streaming services Peacock and Hayu, cable network Bravo, Universal's theme parks and Sky's European media business. Comcast said the separation would allow the two companies to pursue distinct strategic priorities. Completion was expected in summer 2027, subject to customary conditions and approvals.

Under the plan, Mike Cavanagh would become chief executive officer of the independent NBCUniversal company, while Comcast's former chief financial officer Michael Angelakis would become chief executive officer of Comcast following completion of the separation. Chairman Brian L. Roberts would continue to be involved in the leadership of both companies.

Under the proposed transaction announced on June 29, 2026, Comcast shareholders would receive shares in both companies. Comcast also expected to retain an ownership stake of up to 19.9% in NBCUniversal for up to one year after the spin-off, with the intention of monetizing the stake over time.

On July 23, 2026, it was announced that Brian Roberts and Mike Cavanagh were already talking with potential partners ahead of Comcast split, and NBCUniversal becoming independent. NBCUniversal started to explore its options. In an apparent reference to this month’s edition of the annual Allen & Co. Sun Valley event for media and tech execs, Roberts said, "We just came from one of the conferences, and there’s just great ideas, and I’m excited about the road ahead to expand the partnerships we’ve already got." NBCUniversal was in a great position to partner with others. Anchored by NBCUniversal and Sky, the conglomerate would focus on entertainment content, while the other will operate the legacy cable TV, broadband and wireless networks. The separation is expected to be completed by Summer 2027.

== Divisions and subsidiaries ==
=== Comcast Cable (Xfinity) ===
Comcast Cable, which goes by the brand name Xfinity, provides cable television, broadband internet, and home telephone services. Comcast Cable also provides similar services to small to medium-sized businesses through its Comcast Business brand, and Fortune 1000 companies through its Comcast Enterprise brand.

=== NBCUniversal ===
Comcast delivers third-party television programming content to its own customers, and also produces its own first-party content both for subscribers and customers of other competing television services. Fully or partially owned Comcast programming includes Comcast Newsmakers, Comcast SportsNet and SportsNet New York. On May 19, 2009, Disney and ESPN announced an agreement to allow Comcast Corporation to carry the channels ESPNU and ESPN3.

Comcast's content networks and assets also include Bravo, NBCSN and the regional NBC Sports Networks. When Comcast took majority ownership of NBCUniversal, a significant number of cable networks were added to this list. Comcast's NHL deal obligated it to create a U.S. version of NHL Network, launched in October 2007.

Comcast has also operated local channels in some markets, such as Comcast Television in the Detroit region, Comcast Network in the Philadelphia and Mid-Atlantic regions (formerly CN8), and Comcast Entertainment Television in Denver and parts of Utah. They primarily carried local programs and sports (including, in some cases, serving as the designated overflow channel for local regional sports networks).

Peacock generated $5.4 billion in revenue in 2025, compared with $4.9 billion in 2024. Its paid subscriber count increased by 8 million during 2025 to 44 million. Peacock's adjusted EBITDA losses improved by more than $700 million for the year, although the launch of NBA programming on the service began affecting results in the fourth quarter.

==== DreamWorks Animation ====
On August 22, 2016, NBCUniversal bought DreamWorks Animation along with its major IP, including Shrek, How to Train Your Dragon, Kung Fu Panda, Trolls, and Madagascar, included in the acquisition was Classic Media, which included a wide library of IP including Postman Pat, Felix the Cat, Noddy, Rudolph the Red-Nosed Reindeer, Frosty the Snowman, Turok, Casper the Friendly Ghost, VeggieTales among a number of others.

=== Sky Group ===
Through Sky, Comcast offers any first-party and third-party television programming which using the satellite distribution and IPTV (Sky Glass and Sky Stream) systems to its customers and subscribers across several countries in Europe, such as the United Kingdom, Ireland, Germany, Austria, Switzerland, and Italy. It is Europe's largest media company and pay-TV broadcaster by revenue (as of 2018), with 23 million subscribers and more than 31,000 employees as of 2019.

Until November 2018, Sky was owned by 21st Century Fox through a 39.14% controlling stake; on 9 December 2016, following a previous attempt under News Corporation that was affected by the News International phone hacking scandal, 21st Century Fox announced that it had agreed to buy the remainder of Sky, pending government approval. However, after a bidding war that included Disney (which was, in turn, acquiring most of 21st Century Fox assets), Comcast acquired the entirety of Sky in 2018 for £17.28 per-share.

In 2020, NBCUniversal and Sky Group began preparations to launch an international news channel called NBC Sky World News. The service was also planned for it to be available on Peacock in the United States. Plans for the launch – initially scheduled for summer 2020 – were put on hold due to the COVID-19 pandemic in the United Kingdom. and in August, the proposed service was scrapped, resulting in layoffs of 60 employees. NBC subsequently allowed its free streaming service NBC News Now to be seen internationally, and is available globally on YouTube and on Sky TV and Virgin Media in the UK.

Since its acquisition by Comcast, Sky has faced a series of financial woes. Bought for £31 billion, Sky's value has been written down by nearly 25%. In 2023, operating losses doubled as Sky reported a pre-tax loss of £773 million ($1.045 billion). Sky News is estimated to lose at least £30 million ($40.57 million) per annum.

=== Xumo ===
Xumo is a free ad-supported streaming television (FAST) service, which Comcast acquired on February 25, 2020, for an undisclosed amount. The service operates as a business within the Comcast Cable division. Comcast planned to position the service as a complement to its premium streaming service Peacock (as well as compete with Skydance's Pluto TV and Fox Corporation's Tubi), and leverage its streaming technology, as well as its distribution partnerships with smart TV manufacturers.

On October 19, 2021, Comcast announced "XClass TV", a line of smart TVs manufactured by Hisense that would be powered by the X1 software platform used by its cable services.

In April 2022, Comcast and Charter Communications announced that they would form a joint venture to form a "next-generation streaming platform", with Comcast contributing its Xfinity Flex, XClass TV, and Xumo businesses. In November 2022, Comcast and Charter announced that the joint venture would use the Xumo name, with Xumo, Xfinity Flex, and XClass TV rebranded as Xumo Play, Xumo Stream Box, and Xumo TV respectively.

In June 2024, Comcast signed a deal with Fubo to make the streaming service available to its Xfinity Flex or Xumo Stream Box customers, as well as Xumo TVs.

=== Professional sports ===
In 1996, Comcast bought a controlling stake in Spectacor from the company's founder, Ed Snider. Comcast Spectacor holdings now include the Philadelphia Flyers NHL hockey team and their home arena in Philadelphia, as well as esports organization T1, in a joint venture with South Korea's SK Telecom. Over a number of years, Comcast became the majority owner of Comcast SportsNet, as well as Golf Channel and NBCSN (formerly the Outdoor Life Network, then Versus). In 2002, Comcast paid the University of Maryland $25 million for naming rights to the new basketball arena built on the College Park campus, the Xfinity Center. Before it was renamed for Comcast's cable subsidiary, Xfinity Center was called Comcast Center from its opening in 2002 through July 2014. Comcast became the sponsor of NASCAR's second-tier series in 2015, renaming it the NASCAR Xfinity Series.

== Corporate affairs ==
=== Leadership ===
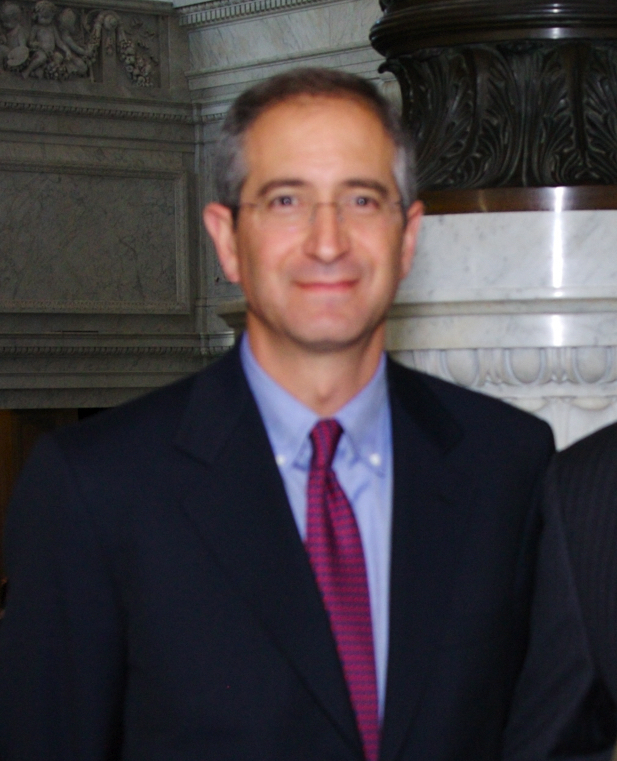
Brian L. Roberts

Comcast is described as a family business. Brian L. Roberts, its chairman and CEO, is the son of founder Ralph J. Roberts (1920–2015). Roberts owns or controls about 1% of all Comcast shares but all of the Class B supervoting shares, giving him an "undilutable 33% voting power over the company". Legal expert and critic Susan P. Crawford has said this gives him "effective control over [Comcast's] every step". In 2010, he was one of the highest-paid executives in the United States, with total compensation of about $31 million.

==== Board of directors ====
As of January 4, 2026:

- Kenneth J. Bacon
- Thomas J. Baltimore Jr.
- Madeline S. Bell
- Louise F. Brady
- Edward D. Breen, Lead Independent Director
- Michael J. Cavanagh, Co-CEO
- Jeffrey A. Honickman
- Wonya Y. Lucas
- Asuka Nakahara
- Brian L. Roberts, Chairman & Co-CEO
- Gordon Smith

==== Executives ====
- Brian L. Roberts, Chairman & Co-CEO
- Michael J. Cavanagh, Co-CEO
  - Jason S. Armstrong, Chief Financial Officer
    - Lisa Bonnell, Executive Vice President, Comcast Global Audit & General Auditor
    - Kristine Dankenbrink, Executive Vice President, Tax
    - Greg Horn, Executive Vice President, Corporate Financial Planning and Analysis
    - Daniel C. Murdock, Executive Vice President, Chief Accounting Officer & Controller
    - Marci Ryvicker, Executive Vice President, Investor Relations
  - Karen Dougherty Buchholz, Executive Vice President, Administration
    - Kimberley D. Harris, Executive Vice President, Comcast Corporation and General Counsel of NBCUniversal
  - Bob Eatroff, Executive Vice President, Global Corporate Development & Strategy
  - Daniel J. Hilferty, Chairman & Chief Executive Officer, Comcast Spectacor
  - Jennifer Khoury, Chief Communications Officer
  - Thomas J. Reid, Chief Legal Officer & Secretary
    - Francis M. Buono, Executive Vice President, Legal Regulatory Affairs & Senior Deputy General Counsel
    - Lynn R. Charytan, Executive Vice President & Senior Deputy General Counsel, Comcast Corporation and Executive Vice President & General Counsel, Comcast Cable
    - Broderick D. Johnson, Executive Vice President, Public Policy & Executive Vice President, Digital Equity
    - Lance West, Executive Vice President, Federal Government Affairs & Head of the Washington, D.C. Office
  - Dana Strong, Group Chief Executive Officer, Sky
  - David N. Watson, President & Chief Executive Officer, Comcast Cable
  - Dalila Wilson-Scott, Executive Vice President and Chief Diversity Officer, Comcast Corporation & President, Comcast NBCUniversal Foundation

=== Corporate offices ===
Comcast is headquartered in Philadelphia, Pennsylvania, and has offices in Atlanta, Detroit, Denver, Manchester, New Hampshire and New York City. On January 3, 2005, it announced it would become the anchor tenant in the new Comcast Center in downtown Philadelphia—at 975 ft (297 m), the second-tallest skyscraper in Pennsylvania. In the fall of 2018, it finished construction of the 1,121 ft (342 m) Comcast Technology Center, Pennsylvania's tallest skyscraper, adjacent to its original headquarters. As of 2019, the company had 184,000 employees.

=== Employee relations ===
Comcast is often criticized by the media and its own staff for its less-than-upstanding policies of employee relations.

A 2014 investigative series published by The Verge involved interviews with 150 Comcast employees and examined why the company was so widely criticized by its customers, the media, and its own workers. It concluded that Comcast's staff endured unreasonable corporate policies: "Customer service has been replaced by an obsession with sales; technicians are understaffed ... tech support is poorly trained, and the company is hobbled by internal fragmentation." A widely read article by an anonymous Comcast call center employee appeared in November 2014 on Cracked. Titled "Five Nightmares You Live While Working For America's Worst Company", it claimed that Comcast was obsessed with sales, did not train its employees properly, and concluded that "the system makes good customer service impossible."

Comcast has also earned a reputation as anti-union. A company training manual says, "Comcast does not feel union representation is in the best interest of its employees, customers, or shareholders". A dispute in 2004 with CWA, a labor union representing many employees at Comcast's Beaverton, Oregon offices, led to allegations of management intimidating workers, requiring them to attend anti-union meetings and unwarranted disciplinary action for union members. In 2011, Comcast received criticism from Writers Guild of America for its policies regarding unions.

Despite these criticisms, Comcast has appeared on multiple "top places to work" lists. In 2009, it was included on CableFAX magazine's "Top 10 Places to Work in Cable", which cited its "scale, savvy and vision". Similarly, the Philadelphia Business Journal awarded Comcast the silver medal among extra-large companies in Philadelphia, with the gold medal going to partner organization, Comcast-Spectacor. The Boston Globe found Comcast to be that city's top place to work in 2009. Employee diversity is also an attribute upon which Comcast receives strong marks. In 2008, Black Enterprise magazine rated Comcast among the top 15 companies for workforce diversity.

=== Financial performance ===
Comcast reported consolidated revenue of $123.707 billion and net income attributable to Comcast Corporation of $19.998 billion for 2025. Revenue was slightly lower than the $123.731 billion reported in 2024, while net income attributable to Comcast increased from $16.192 billion.

Comcast reported revenue of $27.090 billion for its Media segment, $11.286 billion for Studios and $9.836 billion for Theme Parks in 2025. These figures represent the reported revenue of the individual segments; intersegment transactions and eliminations affect the consolidated total.

Year	Revenue in mil. US$	Net income in mil. US$	Total assets in mil. US$	Employees
2006	24,966	2,533	110,405	90,000
2007	31,060	2,587	113,417	100,000
2008	34,423	2,547	113,017	100,000
2009	35,756	3,638	112,733	107,000
2010	37,937	3,635	118,534	102,000
2011	55,842	4,160	157,818	126,000
2012	62,570	6,203	164,971	129,000
2013	64,657	6,816	158,813	136,000
2014	68,775	8,380	159,186	139,000
2015	74,510	8,163	166,574	153,000
2016	80,403	8,695	180,500	159,000
2017	85,029	22,714	186,949	164,000
2018	94,507	11,731	251,684	184,000
2019	108,942	13,057	263,414	190,000
2020	103,564	10,534	273,869	168,000
2021	116,385	14,159	275,905	189,000
2022	121,400	5,370	275,300	186,000

=== Lobbying and electoral fundraising ===
With $18.8 million spent in 2013, Comcast has the seventh largest lobbying budget of any individual company or organization in the United States. Comcast employs multiple former U.S. Congressmen as lobbyists. The National Cable & Telecommunications Association, which has multiple Comcast executives on its board, also represents Comcast and other cable companies as the fifth largest lobbying organization in the United States, spending $19.8 million in 2013. Comcast was among the top backers of Barack Obama's presidential runs, with Comcast vice president David Cohen raising over $2.2 million from 2007 to 2012. Cohen has been described by many sources as influential in the U.S. government, though he is no longer a registered lobbyist, as the time he spends lobbying falls short of the 20% which requires official registration.

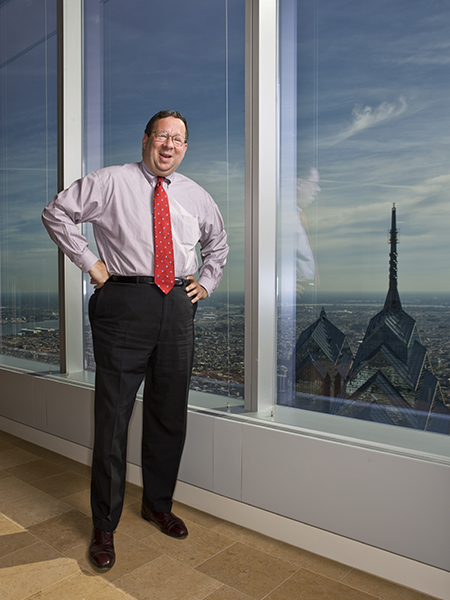
David L. Cohen in 2008

Comcast's PAC, the Comcast Corporation and NBCUniversal Political Action Committee, is among the largest PACs in the U.S., raising about $3.7 million from 2011 to 2012 for the campaigns of various candidates for office in the United States Federal Government. Comcast is also a major backer of the National Cable and Telecommunications Association Political Action Committee, which raised $2.6 million from 2011 to 2012. Comcast spent the most money of any organization in support of the Stop Online Piracy and PROTECT IP bills, spending roughly $5 million to lobby for their passage. Comcast also backs lobbying and PACs on a regional level, backing organizations such as the Tennessee Cable Telecommunications Association and the Broadband Communications Association of Washington PAC. Comcast and other cable companies have lobbied state governments to pass legislation restricting or banning individual cities from offering public broadband service. Municipal broadband restrictions of varying scope have been passed in a total of 20 U.S. States.

According to watchdog group Documented, in 2020 Comcast contributed $200,000 to the Rule of Law Defense Fund, a fund-raising arm of the Republican Attorneys General Association that was shown to have provided funding to the Save America March that devolved into an attack on the U.S. Capitol on January 6, 2021.

In 2025, Comcast was one of the donors who funded the White House's East Wing demolition and planned building of a ballroom.

=== Philanthropy ===
Comcast offers low-cost internet and cable service to schools, subsidized by general broadband consumers through the U.S. government's E-Rate program. Critics have noted that many of the strongest supporters of Comcast's business deals have received substantial funding from the Comcast Foundation. However, for years, Comcast has been relying on subsidiaries to finance philanthropic pursuits.

== Cybersecurity incidents ==
=== May 28–29, 2008 Comcast.net hijacking ===
On May 28–29, 2008, the hacker group Kryogeniks, including James Robert Black Jr. (aka "Defiant"), Christopher Allen Lewis ("EBK"), and Michael Paul Nebel ("Slacker"), redirected traffic from Comcast.net-including webmail and voicemail-by taking control of Comcast's domain via its registrar, Network Solutions. The attackers used Social engineering (security) (two phone calls) and a compromised Comcast email account to change domain contact information and alter the domain's DNS settings, resulting in Comcast customers being redirected to a webpage showing a message asserting responsibility ("KRYOGENIKS Defiant and EBK RoXed COMCAST sHouTz to VIRUS Warlock elul21 coll1er seven."). The outage lasted approximately five hours and caused an estimated loss of $128,000 USD to Comcast. Black was later sentenced in 2010 to four months in prison, house arrest/electronic home monitoring, 150 hours of community service, supervised release, and restitution.

=== July 2015 Aptean SupportSoft vulnerability affecting Comcast ===
In July 2015, security researchers Blake Welsh and Eric Taylor discovered a cross-site scripting (XSS) vulnerability in Aptean's SupportSoft customer support software, which was used by Comcast. The flaw allowed malicious code to be injected via manipulated URLs, enabling the display of fake login pages that could be used for phishing attacks. Comcast was among the companies tested and notified of the issue.

=== 2015 password reset incident ===
In November 2015, Comcast required approximately 200,000 customers to reset their passwords after email and password combinations were discovered for sale online. The company stated its internal systems were not breached and that the compromised credentials were likely obtained from other breaches, phishing, or malware.

=== 2016 Xfinity Home security system flaws ===
In January 2016, researchers at Rapid7 disclosed flaws in Comcast's Xfinity Home security system. The vulnerabilities allowed attackers to disrupt communications between sensors and the central hub using radio jamming, potentially preventing the detection of intrusions. The system also failed to alert users when communications were lost.

=== 2023 Xfinity CitrixBleed data breach CVE-2023-4966 ===
In December 2023, Comcast disclosed that approximately 35.9 million Xfinity accounts had been affected by exploitation of a Citrix NetScaler Vulnerability (computer security), known as "CitrixBleed" (CVE-2023-4966). Exposed information included usernames, encrypted passwords, and, for some customers, dates of birth, contact details, and the last four digits of Social Security numbers. Comcast required password resets and urged customers to enable two-factor authentication.

=== 2024 vendor ransomware exposure (FBCS) ===
In February 2024, Financial Business and Consumer Solutions (FBCS), a debt collection agency formerly used by Comcast, reported a ransomware attack that exposed information on approximately 237,000 Comcast customers. The exposed data included names, addresses, date of birth, Social Security numbers, and account numbers.

=== 2025 Salt Typhoon espionage reports ===
In June 2025, U.S. government agencies assessed that Comcast was among several telecommunications providers likely targeted by a Chinese state-linked cyber-espionage group referred to as "Salt Typhoon". Details of the intrusion and whether data was exfiltrated remain unclear.

== Criticism and controversies ==
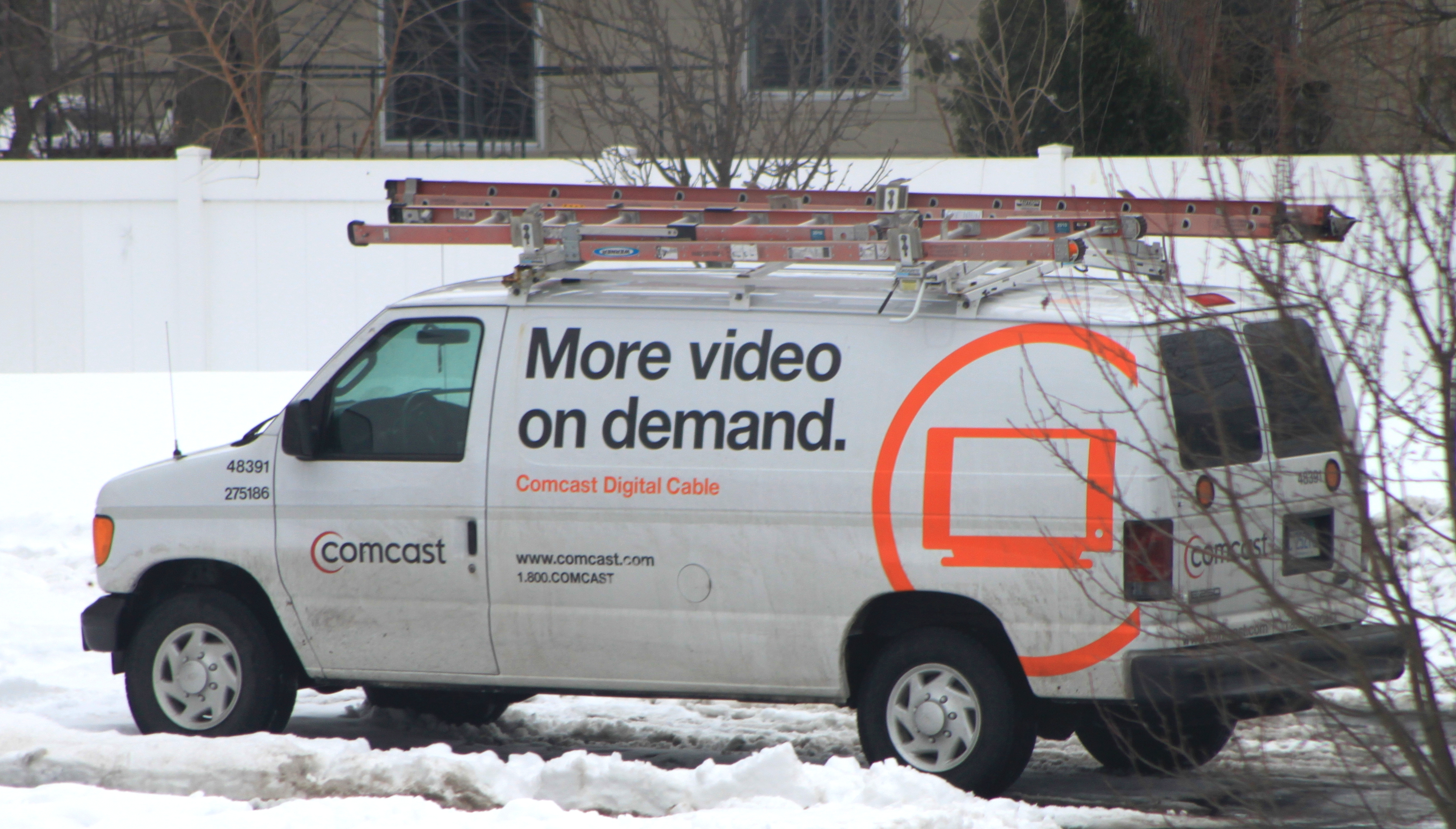
Comcast service van, Ypsilanti Township, Michigan

In 2004 and 2007, the American Customer Satisfaction Index (ACSI) survey found that Comcast had the worst customer satisfaction rating of any company or government agency in the country, including the Internal Revenue Service. The ACSI indicates that almost half of all cable customers (regardless of company) have registered complaints, and that cable is the only industry to score below 60 in the ACSI. Comcast's Customer Service Rating by the ACSI surveys indicate that the company's customer service has not improved since the surveys began in 2001. Analysis of the surveys states that "Comcast is one of the lowest scoring companies in ACSI. As its customer satisfaction eroded by 7% over the past year, revenue increased by 12%." The ACSI analysis also addresses this contradiction, stating that "Such pricing power usually comes with some level of monopoly protection and most cable companies have little competition at the local level. This also means that a cable company can do well financially even though its customers are not particularly satisfied."

In April 2014, Comcast was awarded the 2014 "Worst Company in America" award; an annual contest by the consumer affairs blog The Consumerist that runs a series of reader polls to determine the least popular company in America. This was the second time Comcast had been awarded this title, the first being in 2010.

Comcast spends millions of dollars annually on lobbying. Comcast employs the spouses, sons and daughters of mayors, councilmen, commissioners, and other officials to assure its continued preferred market allocations.

Comcast was given an "F" for its corporate governance practices in 2010, by Corporate Library, an independent shareholder-research organization. According to Corporate Library, Comcast's board of directors' ability to oversee and control management was severely compromised (at least in 2010) by the fact that several of the directors either worked for the company or had business ties to it (making them susceptible to management pressure), and a third of the directors were over 70 years of age. According to The Wall Street Journal, nearly two-thirds of the flights of Comcast's $40 million corporate jet purchased for business travel related to the NBCU acquisition were to CEO Brian Roberts' private homes or to resorts.

On August 1, 2016, Washington State Attorney General Bob Ferguson filed a lawsuit against Comcast Corporation in King County Superior Court, alleging the company's own documents reveal a pattern of illegally deceiving its customers to pad its bottom line by tens of millions of dollars. The FCC issued a $2.3 million fine to Comcast after finding that the company was charging customers for unordered services and equipment. More than a thousand customers issued complaints about these unprecedented charges on their bills. In addition, numerous customers reported inappropriate name-calling and interrogation by customer service representatives. Comcast's executive vice president, David Cohen, admitted the company needed to improve its customer service.

On August 8, 2016, an official Comcast employee confirmed that Comcast was changing native 1080i channels to the 720p60 format. "Official Employees are from multiple teams within Comcast: Product, Support, Leadership."

In February 2017, Comcast was ordered by the self-regulatory National Advertising Review Board to cease using a claim based on Speedtest.net data that it has "America's fastest internet", stating that "Ookla's data showed only that Xfinity consumers who took advantage of the free tests offered on the Speedtest.net website subscribed to tiers of service with higher download speeds than Verizon FiOS consumers who took advantage of the tests." They were also ordered to stop using a claim that the company offers the "fastest in-home Wi-Fi", which was poorly substantiated.

On December 21, 2018, Minnesota State Attorney General Lori Swanson filed a lawsuit against Comcast in Hennepin County over allegations that the company had overcharged customers for cable packages, added home security, service protection plans, modem and other equipment packages to customers bills without their consent, and did not give customers the prepaid $200 Visa cards it promised to give if customers kept up-to-date on their monthly bills for 90 days on its advertisements. On January 25, 2020, the lawsuit was settled, Comcast being ordered to refund 15,600 customers and give 16,000 other customers debt relief. Comcast was also ordered to disclose the full amounts customers will be charged for using its services in its advertisements.

Comcast was the last major cable provider or streamer to neglect to carry the ACC Network, prompting some customers to consider cutting the cord or switching providers. Forbes magazine criticized the decision not to carry the college sports network as violating a fundamental principle of marketing: "never give your customers a reason to switch." North Carolina Governor Roy Cooper asked Comcast and AT&T to carry the network, after which AT&T did so on its U-Verse cable service. Comcast signed a deal to carry the ACC Network in November 2021.

In June 2021, the Supreme Court rejected a petition for review by Comcast regarding an antitrust lawsuit by Viamedia, Inc. after the Biden administration had recommended against review.

In September 2024, Marc Caputo reported that Comcast had made a $50,000 donation to the anti-abortion PAC Florida Freedom Fund. Two years earlier, Comcast announced it would give up to $10,000 in travel money to employees living in states with tight abortion restrictions in order to receive abortion care.

== Carbon footprint ==
Comcast reported total CO2e emissions (direct + indirect) for the twelve months ending 31 December 2020 at 2,291 Kt (-249 /-9.8% y-o-y).

Comcast's annual total CO2e emissions (direct + indirect) (in kilotonnes)
Dec. 2019	Dec. 2020	Dec. 2021	Dec. 2022	Dec. 2023
2,540	2,291	2,071	1,978	1,966
