= Bruce Alva Gimbel =

American businessman (1913–1980)

- Born: Bruce Alva Gimbel; July 28, 1913; New York City, US
- Died: October 7, 1980 (age 67); Greenwich, Connecticut, US
- Occupation: Retail executive
- Known for: President of Gimbels
- Spouses: Doris Asiel; Barbara Poulson
- Children: 3
- Parent(s): Alva Bernheimer Gimbel; Bernard Gimbel
- Family: Adam Gimbel (great-grandfather); Hank Greenberg (brother-in-law); Edward Lasker (brother-in-law); David Solinger (brother-in-law); Lynn Stern (niece); Peter Mendelsund (grandson); Lisa Mendelsund (granddaughter)

Bruce Alva Gimbel (July 28, 1913 – October 7, 1980) was an American businessman and president of the Gimbels department store.

== Biography ==
Gimbel was born on July 28, 1913, to a Jewish family, the son of Alva (née Bernheimer) and Bernard Gimbel. He had four siblings: twins Peter Gimbel and David Gimbel; and twins Hope Gimbel and Caral Gimbel. His sister Hope was married and divorced from art collector David M. Solinger and mother of photographer Lynn Stern. His sister Caral was married and divorced from Edward Lasker, son of Albert Lasker; and baseball superstar Hank Greenberg before settling down with World War II hero Joseph M. Lebworth. In 1935, he graduated from Yale University. Gimbel ferried planes during World War II before working for the family company, the only child of Bernard to do so, as vice president of sales in 1946.

== Career ==
Gimbel worked up through the ranks at Gimbels, becoming president upon his father's retirement in 1953. The company at the time had over $300 million in sales, 15 stores, and 20,000 employees. Faced with declining sales at its downtown stores, he expanded the chain into the suburbs; and using a newly established network of local buying offices in France, Italy, Spain, Germany, and England, he stocked his stores with imported copies of name-brand merchandise. Both tactics worked for a time, but facing a new economic reality, he closed Saks Fifth Avenue's 34th street flagship store in 1965. Soon after, in 1968, he forced his cousin, Adam Long Gimbel (husband of Sophie Gimbel), who operated the 31-store Saks Fifth Avenue chain, to retire. In 1972, he established a Gimbels store for $30 million on the Upper East Side, thinking he could capture the neighborhood's wealthy residents; the store was a failure. In July 1973, Gimbels was purchased for $205 million by Brown & Williamson Tobacco Corporation, the country's third-largest tobacco company. He retired in 1975. In 1986, the Gimbels brand was retired.

== Personal life ==
Gimbel married twice: first to Doris Asiel with whom he had a son, Robert B. Gimbel, and then to Barbara Poulson with whom he had a son, John B. Gimbel. He also adopted a daughter, Judith C. Gimbel, who married architect Benjamin Mendelsund, with whom she had a daughter, Lisa Mendelsund, and a son, graphic artist Peter Mendelsund.
