= Stephen Greenberg =

American baseball executive

Deputy Commissioner of Baseball
- In office January 1, 1990 – April 13, 1993
- Preceded by: Fay Vincent
- Succeeded by: Paul Beeston

Personal details
- Born: September 8, 1948 (age 78) New York City, U.S.
- Spouse: Myrna Katz (m. 1970)
- Children: 2
- Parents: Hank Greenberg (father); Caral Gimbel (mother)
- Relatives: Bernard Gimbel (grandfather); Peter Gimbel (uncle); Bruce Alva Gimbel (uncle); Lynn Stern (first cousin)
- Education: Hotchkiss School
- Alma mater: Yale University (B.A.); UCLA School of Law (J.D.)
- Occupation: Baseball executive; Sports agent; Investment banker
- Baseball career
- Infielder / outfielder
- Bats: Right Throws: Right
Medals
Men's baseball
Representing United States
Baseball World Cup
Silver medal – second place	1969 Santo Domingo	Team

Stephen David Greenberg (born September 8, 1948) is an American former baseball executive who served as deputy Commissioner of Baseball and chief operating officer of Major League Baseball under commissioners Fay Vincent and Bud Selig. Greenberg is also the co-founder of Classic Sports Network which later became known as ESPN Classic. He is the son of Hall of Fame baseball player Hank Greenberg.

== Early life ==
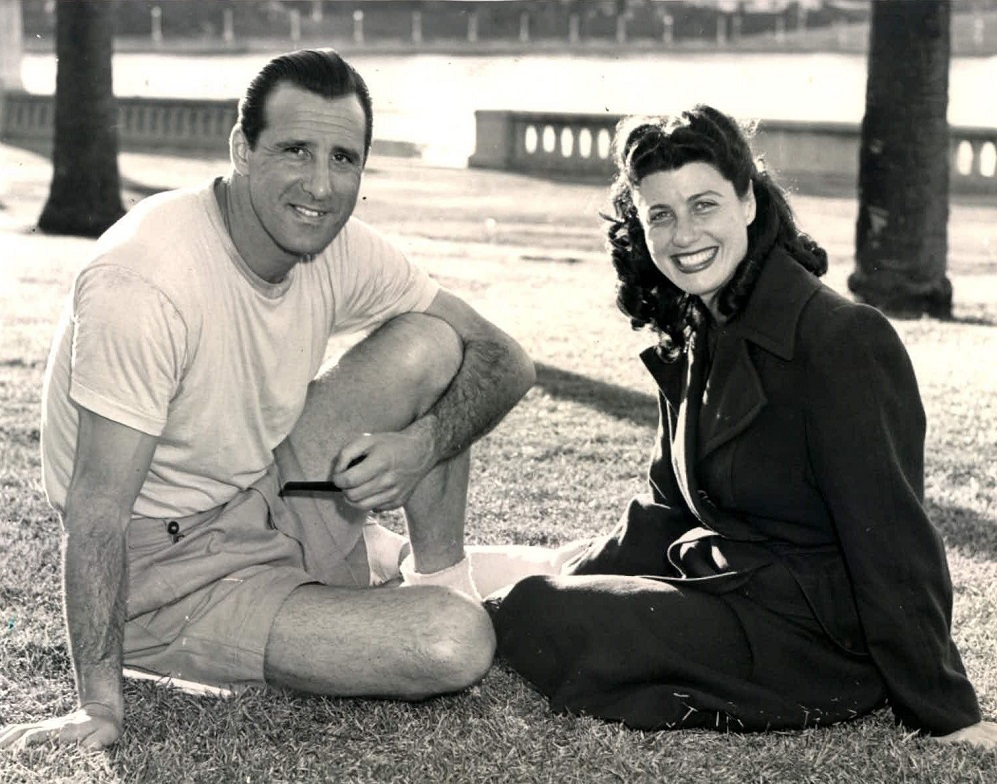
Greenberg's parents Hank and Caral

Greenberg was born in New York City on September 8, 1948 to Caral (née Gimbel) and Hank Greenberg. He was one of three children, alongside his brother Glenn and sister Alva.

His father was a former star baseball player with the Detroit Tigers and Pittsburgh Pirates who retired after the 1947 season and would be elected to the Baseball Hall of Fame in 1956. His mother was a member of the prominent Gimbel family and daughter of Bernard Gimbel.

Stephen spent most of his early life in Cleveland where his father worked as general manager. He attended Hotchkiss School, a boarding school in Connecticut. Greenberg intended to follow his father into baseball. In 1968, he was a part of the Falmouth Commodores championship team who beat the Harwich Mariners in a best-of-five series. In an exciting Game 4 finale at Guv Fuller Field, with the score tied at 10–10 and the bases loaded for Falmouth in the bottom of the tenth, Greenberg drew a walk to force in the series-winning run.

He attended Yale University where he played varsity baseball for four years while majoring in English. He also played varsity soccer where he played the position of goalkeeper. In 1970, he was drafted by the Washington Senators in the 17th round and was the 398th overall pick.

Greenberg played in the 1969 Amateur World Series as a member of the United States national baseball team. He batted .296 with 11 runs batted in as the team finished second behind Cuba.

== Playing career ==
Greenberg spent five years in the minor leagues, mostly as a first and third baseman with occasional games as an outfielder. He began his career with the Geneva Senators of the New York-Pennsylvania League where hit .277 with six home runs in 50 games played in 1970. The following season he split his time between the Pittsfield Senators of the Eastern League and the Burlington Senators of the Carolina League, hitting .225 with five home runs on the year in 91 games.

Despite his poor performance, he was promoted to Triple-A Denver Bears of the American Association in 1972. There, his hitting improved to .264 in 104 games with 12 home runs. In 1973 and 1974, he played for the Spokane Indians of the Pacific Coast League, hitting .281 and .281 respectively.

Feeling his playing career was going nowhere, Greenberg retired after 1974 despite showing a strong overall improvement. Over five years, he hit .269 with 43 home runs, 244 runs batted in, 431 hits (20 doubles and 15 triples), and an on-base percentage of .381 and 278 base on balls. As a fielder, Greenberg played 338 games at first, 101 games at third, and 53 in the outfield.

== Post-playing career ==
After retiring as a player, Greenberg attended UCLA School of Law, graduating in 1977. He went on to become a player representative for Major League players, representing over 50 players, including four-time NL batting champion and three-time All-Star Bill Madlock.

Greenberg served as deputy commissioner of Major League Baseball, having been offered the job by MLB Commissioner Fay Vincent. He had been offered another role by Bart Giamatti, Vincent's predecessor, four days before his death. He also served under acting commissioner Bud Selig but resigned in 1993, feeling disillusioned by the animosity between the owners and MLB front offices and the players. His term ended on April 13, and he was eventually succeeded by Paul Beeston.

In 1995, Stephen co-founded Classic Sports Network with Brian Bedol, which was later purchased by ESPN and became ESPN Classic. He also was the chairman of College Sports Television (CSTV), the first cable network devoted exclusively to college sports.

Greenberg was offered the role of Commissioner of Baseball when Bud Selig stepped down in 2015. However, he turned it down, preferring to remain at his then-job at Allen & Company where he helped facilitate six Major League team sales since joining the firm in 2000. He was serving as the firm's managing director as recently as 2020.

Greenberg has also served on the Board of Directors of the Jackie Robinson Foundation.

== Personal life ==
After graduating from Yale, Greenberg married Myrna Katz, a graduate of New York University, on May 31, 1970. The couple have two daughters, Jennifer and Melanie, and four grandchildren.

He is the brother-in-law of Linda Vester, his brother Glenn's third wife.
