= Sullenger =

Sullenger is a surname, being an Americanized form of the German surname Solinger. Notable people with the surname include:

- Bruce A. Sullenger, American physician
- Cheryl Sullenger (born 1955), American anti-abortion activist and felon
- Jacob Sullenger (born 1995), better known as Jawny, American singer, songwriter, and producer

== See also ==
- Solinger
