= Bernard Gimbel =

American businessman (1885–1966)

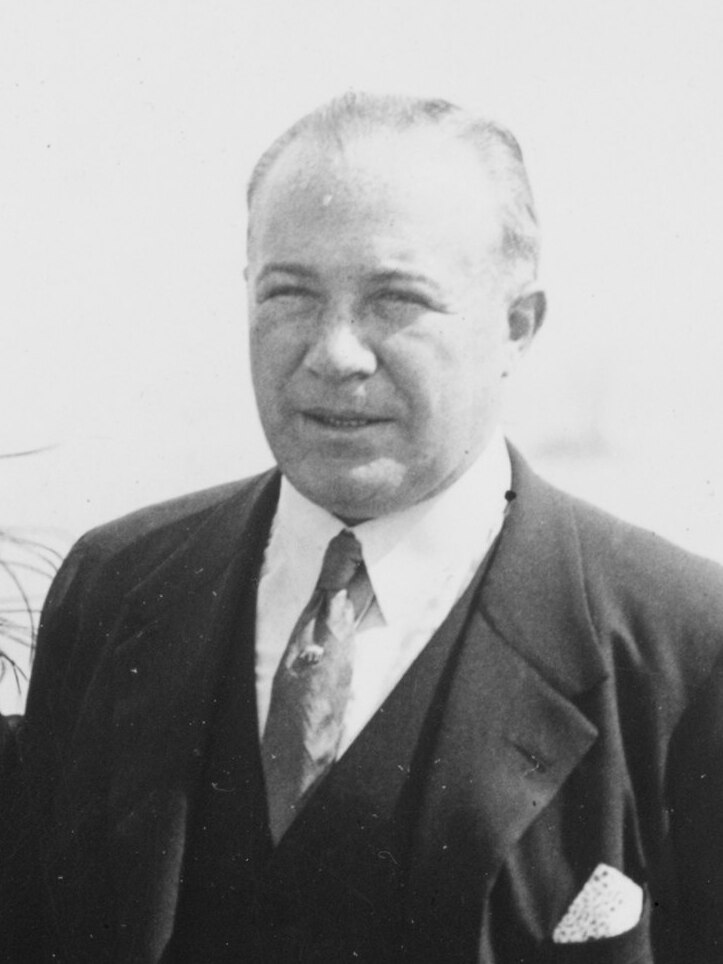
- Gimbel in 1925
- Born: April 10, 1885
- Died: September 29, 1966 (aged 81)
- Education: University of Pennsylvania (B.A.)
- Occupations: Businessman and President of Gimbel Brothers Department Stores
- Spouse: Alva Bernheimer
- Children: Bruce Alva Gimbel; Peter Gimbel; David Alva Gimbel; Hope Gimbel Solinger; Caral Gimbel Greenberg
- Parent(s): Rachel Feustman Gimbel; Isaac Gimbel
- Family: Adam Gimbel (grandfather); Hank Greenberg (son-in-law); Edward Lasker (son-in-law); Lynn Stern (granddaughter); Stephen Greenberg (grandson)

Bernard Feustman Gimbel (April 10, 1885 – September 29, 1966) was an American businessman and president of the Gimbels department store.

== Biography ==
Gimbel was born to Jewish parents, Rachel (née Feustman) and Isaac Gimbel, son of Adam Gimbel, founder of the Gimbels chain of department stores. In 1907, he graduated from the University of Pennsylvania. He started as a shipping clerk for his family's company and worked his way up to vice president in 1909.

In 1910, Gimbel convinced his family to open a department store in New York City at the cost of $17 million ($590 million in 2025 dollars). In 1922, he convinced his family to list Gimbels on the New York Stock Exchange although with the family maintaining a controlling interest. In 1923, Gimbels purchased a controlling interest in Saks Fifth Avenue for $8 million from Horace Saks, son of Andrew Saks, using the money from the Gimbel's stock issuance. Also in 1923, Gimbels purchased the Kaufmann & Baer store in Pittsburgh (Kaufmann & Baer was founded by the cousins of the Kaufmann's department store also in Pittsburgh). After Horace Saks died in 1926, he appointed his cousin Adam Long Gimbel (son of Charles Gimbel, the husband of Sophie Gimbel).

In 1926, Gimbel took over the company after his father was partially paralyzed after being thrown from a horse. While president, he targeted his rival Macy's which was featured in the movie Miracle on 34th Street, and expanded the Saks brand nationally. In 1930, the company operated 20 stores with $123 million in sales ($2.4 billion in 2025 dollars), the largest department store chain in the world. Prior to World War II, Gimbel stocked up on consumer products he felt would be scarce if a war were to erupt, which paid off handsomely later. In 1953, Gimbel retired handing control to his son Bruce Alva Gimbel; at the time, Gimbel's had $300 million in sales.

Gimbels later was purchased by the Batus Retail Group and then the brand was retired in 1986.

== Personal life ==
In 1912, Gimbel married 18 year old Alva Bernheimer; they had five children: Bruce Alva Gimbel; twins Peter Gimbel and David Gimbel; and twins Hope Gimbel and Caral Gimbel. His daughter Hope was married and divorced from art collector David M. Solinger (their daughter, Lynn Stern, a photographer married architect Robert A. M. Stern). His daughter Caral was married and divorced from Edward Lasker, son of Albert Lasker; and baseball superstar Hank Greenberg, before settling down with World War II hero Joseph M. Lebworth. His son David Alva died of cancer at the age of 29.

Gimbel died in 1966. Services were held at Temple Emanu-El in Manhattan.
