= Robert A. M. Stern =

American architect (1939–2025)

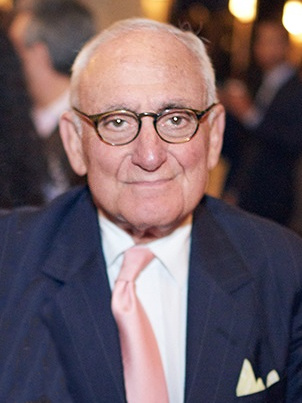
- Stern in 2015
- Born: May 23, 1939; New York City, U.S.
- Died: November 27, 2025 (aged 86); New York City, U.S.
- Education: Columbia University (BA); Yale University (MArch)
- Occupation: Architect
- Spouse: Lynn Solinger (m. 1966; div. 1977)
- Children: 1
- Awards: Driehaus Architecture Prize
- Buildings: Comcast Tower, 15 Central Park West, 220 Central Park South, 520 Park Avenue, 30 Park Place, Pauli Murray College and Benjamin Franklin College

Robert Arthur Morton Stern (May 23, 1939 – November 27, 2025) was an American architect, educator and author. He was the founding partner of the architecture firm, Robert A. M. Stern Architects, also known as RAMSA. From 1998 to 2016, he was the Dean of the Yale School of Architecture.

His firm's major works include the classically styled New York apartment building, 15 Central Park West; two residential colleges at Yale University; Philadelphia's Museum of the American Revolution; and the modernist Comcast Center skyscraper in Philadelphia. In 2011, Stern was honored with the Driehaus Architecture Prize for his achievements in contemporary classical architecture.

== Early life and education ==
Born in the Brooklyn borough of New York City on May 23, 1939, to a Jewish family, Stern spent his earliest years with his parents in the nearby Manhattan borough. After 1940, they moved back to Brooklyn, where Stern grew up. Stern received a bachelor's degree from Columbia University in 1960 and a master's degree in architecture from Yale University in 1965. Stern cited the historian Vincent Scully and the architect Philip Johnson as early mentors and influences.

== Career ==
After graduating from Yale, Stern worked as a curator for the Architectural League of New York, a job he gained through his connection to Philip Johnson. While at the League, he organized the second 40 Under 40 show, which featured his own work alongside work of then-little-known architects Charles Moore, Robert Venturi, and Romaldo Giurgola, all of whom were featured as authors in the influential issue of Perspecta that Stern edited a year before at Yale. Upon leaving the Architectural League in 1966, Stern worked briefly as a designer in the office of the architect Richard Meier, then worked for two and a half years at New York City's Housing and Development Administration, after which he established Stern & Hagmann with John S. Hagmann, a fellow student from his days at Yale. In 1977, he founded its successor firm, Robert A.M. Stern Architects, now known as RAMSA.

=== Educator ===
Stern was the dean of the Yale School of Architecture from 1998 to 2016, and taught there after the end of his tenure until 2022. From 1970 to 1998, he taught at Columbia University, in the Columbia Graduate School of Architecture, Planning and Preservation. From 1984 to 1988, was the inaugural director of Columbia GSAPP's Temple Hoyne Buell Center for the Study of American Architecture, and from 1992 to 1998, Stern served as Director of the Graduate Program in Historic Preservation at GSAPP.

=== Other activities ===
A prolific writer, Stern authored, co-authored, and edited numerous books about architecture, including six volumes about New York City's architectural history, each focusing on a different period. In 1986, he hosted Pride of Place: Building the American Dream, an eight-part documentary series that aired on PBS. The series featured Peter Eisenman, Léon Krier, Philip Johnson, Frank Gehry, and other notable architects.

== Work ==
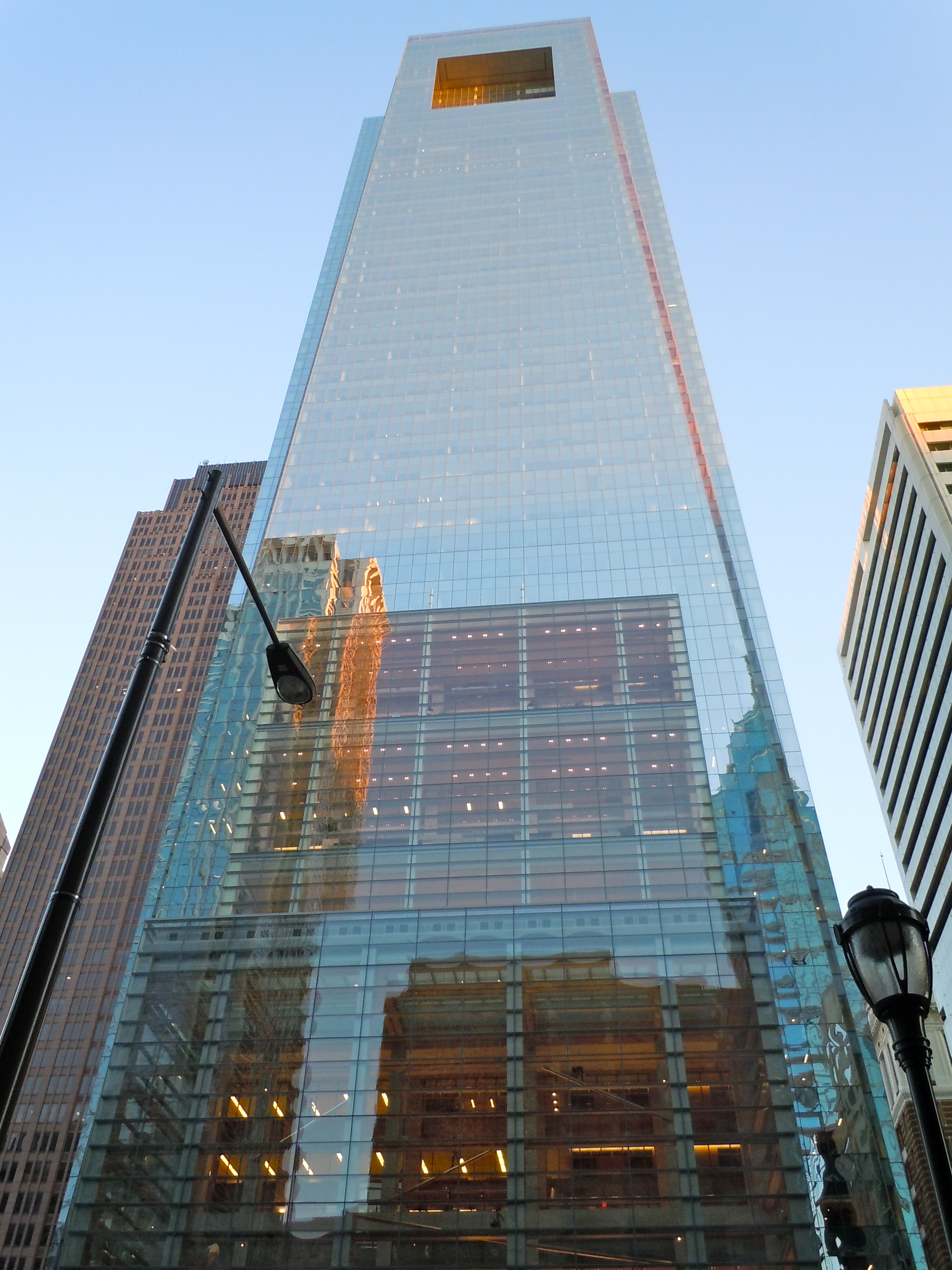
Comcast Center, in Philadelphia

Many of Stern's early works were private houses in the New York metropolitan area, including in the Hamptons and in Westchester County. His early commercial commissions included projects for Walt Disney World such as Disney's Yacht Club Resort, Disney's Beach Club Resort and the master plan for Celebration, Florida, and from 1992 to 2003, Stern served on the board of the Walt Disney Company.

Stern was later better known for his large-scale condominium and apartment building projects in New York City, which include 20 East End Avenue, The Chatham, The Brompton, and 15 Central Park West. The latter was, at the time of its completion, one of the most financially successful apartment buildings ever constructed, with sales totaling $2 billion, later succeeded by 220 Central Park South.

Stern designed some of the tallest structures in the United States, including the glass-clad Comcast Center, the second tallest building in both Philadelphia and Pennsylvania. The Driehaus Prize committee (commenting on a preliminary, stone-clad, pyramidal-topped scheme) characterized the design as "[carrying] forward the proportions of the classical obelisk". The scheme, along with Stern's 15 Central Park West, and his master plan for Celebration, were cited as contributing factors in his having won the award. More recently, Stern designed three skyscrapers in New York City, 220 Central Park South, 520 Park Avenue, and 30 Park Place, which became some of the tallest buildings in the city and the United States once completed. In 2017, RAMSA completed a major addition to the campus of Yale University, with two new residential colleges, Pauli Murray College and Benjamin Franklin College, both designed in a Collegiate Gothic style.

He also designed Schwarzman College in China; its 200,000-square-foot (19,000 m^{2}) campus houses advanced higher-education facilities and was LEED Gold-certified.

=== Style ===
In the 1970s, and early 1980s, Stern developed a reputation as a postmodern architect for integrating classical elements into his designs for contemporary buildings. Stern contributed a postmodern architectural facade to the Strada Novissima in The Presence of the Past exhibit at the 1980 Venice Architecture Biennale. In the mid-1980s, his work became more traditional, more in keeping with the then emerging New Classical architectural movement. Stern, however, rejected such characterizations, arguing that his projects draw on vernacular context and local traditions.

=== Notable projects ===
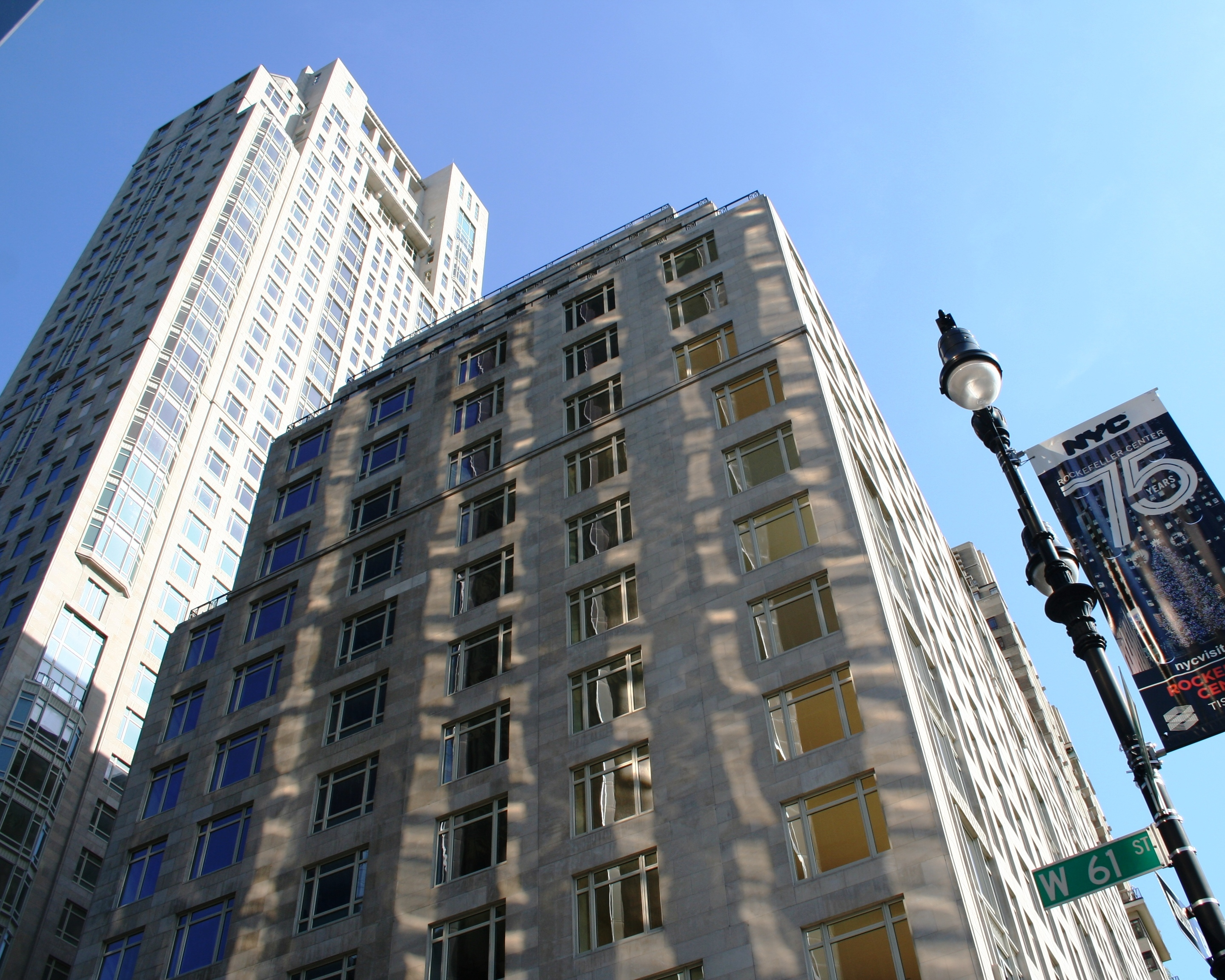
15 Central Park West in New York City, 2008

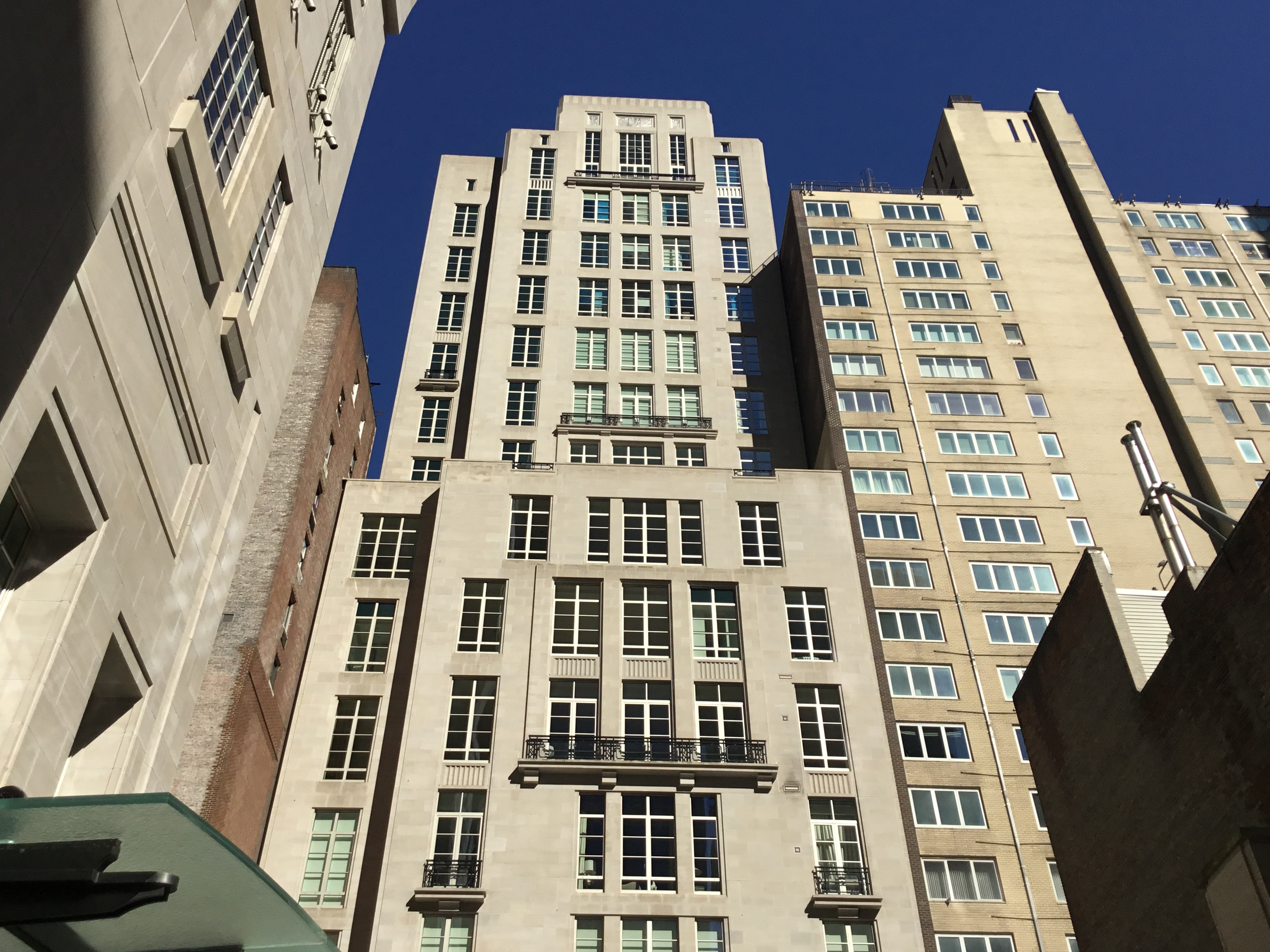
220 Central Park South in New York, 2019

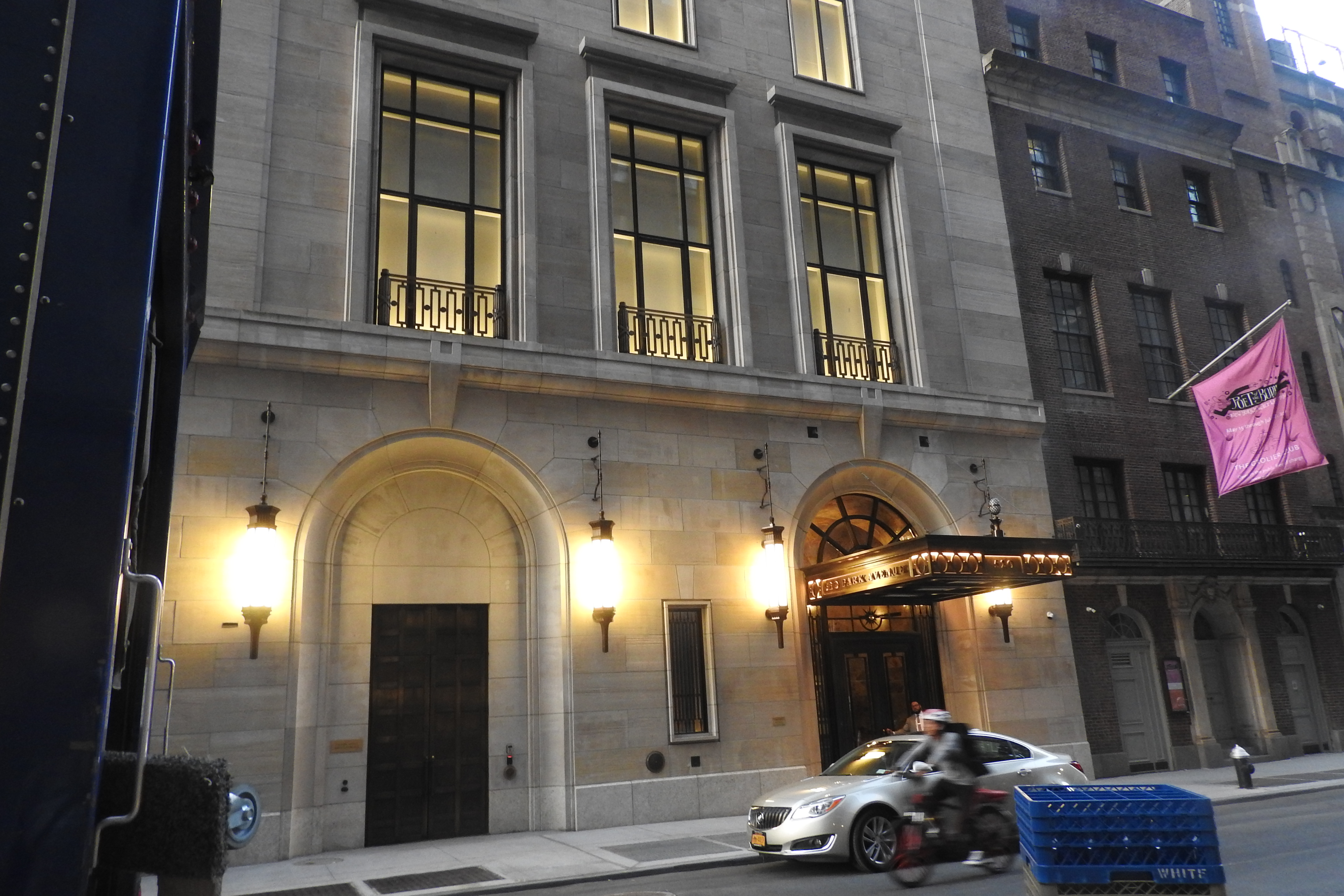
520 Park Avenue in New York City, 2018

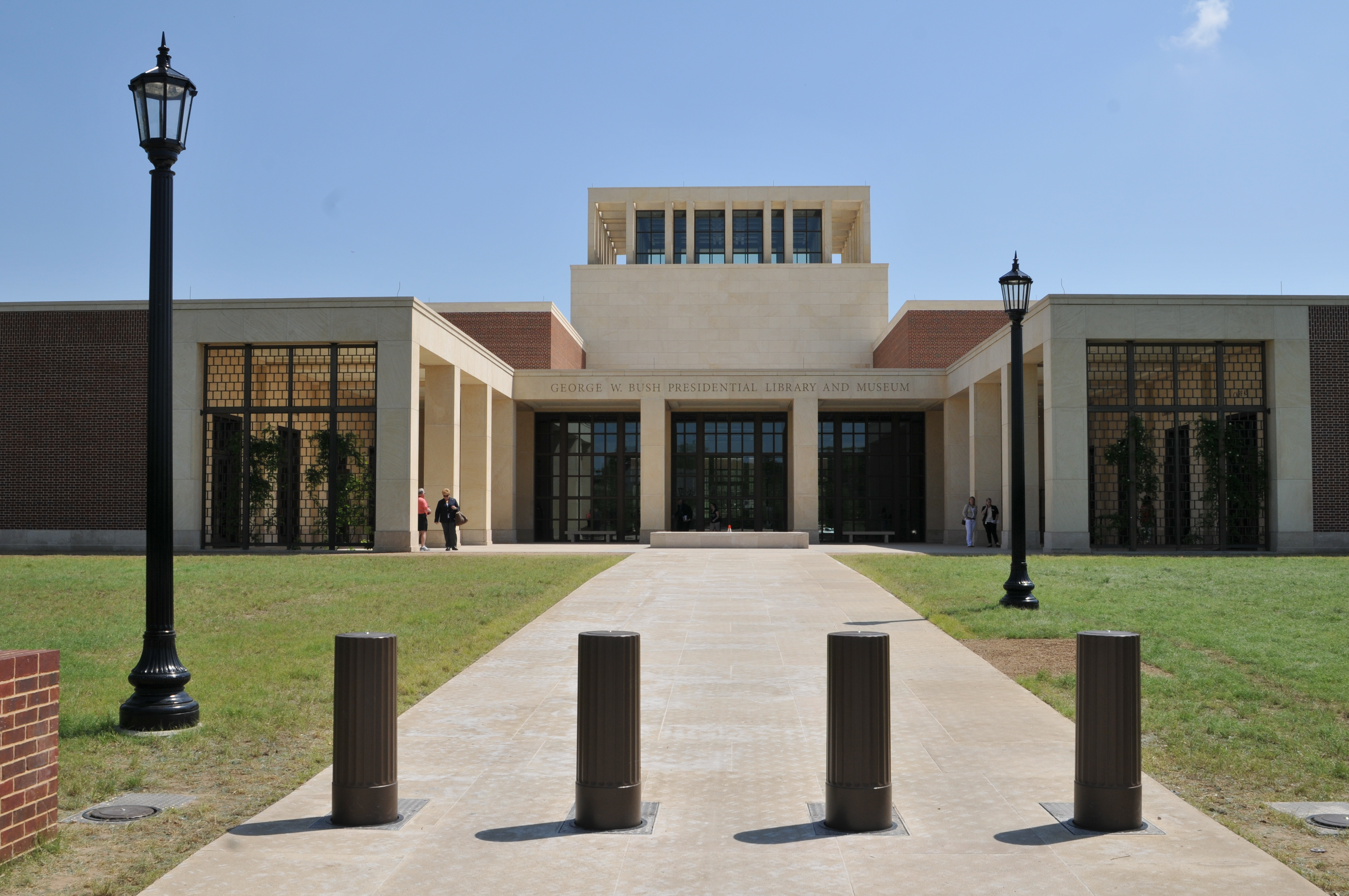
George W. Bush Presidential Center in Dallas, Texas, US, 2013

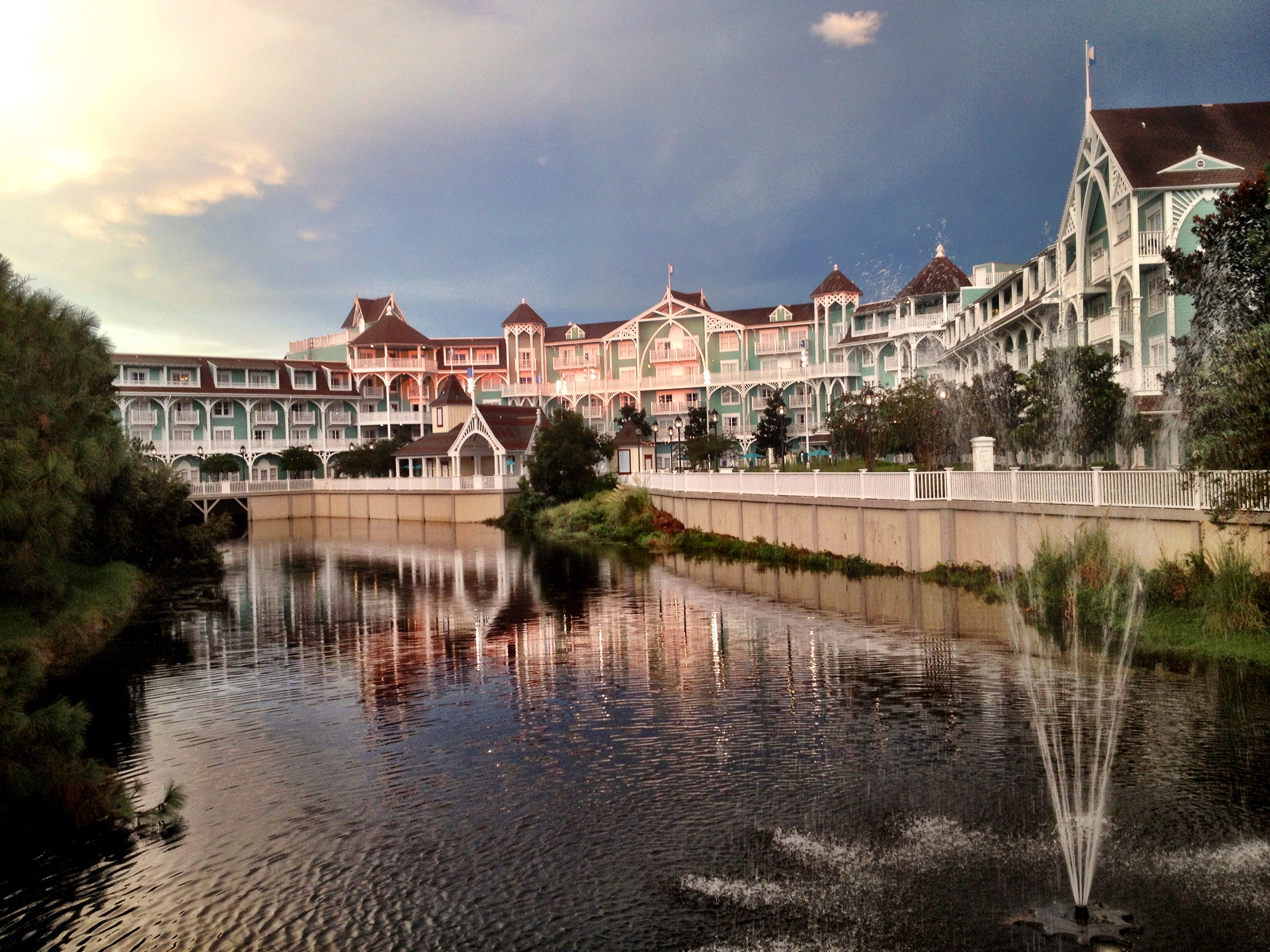
Disney's Beach Club Resort at the Walt Disney World, Florida, US, 1990

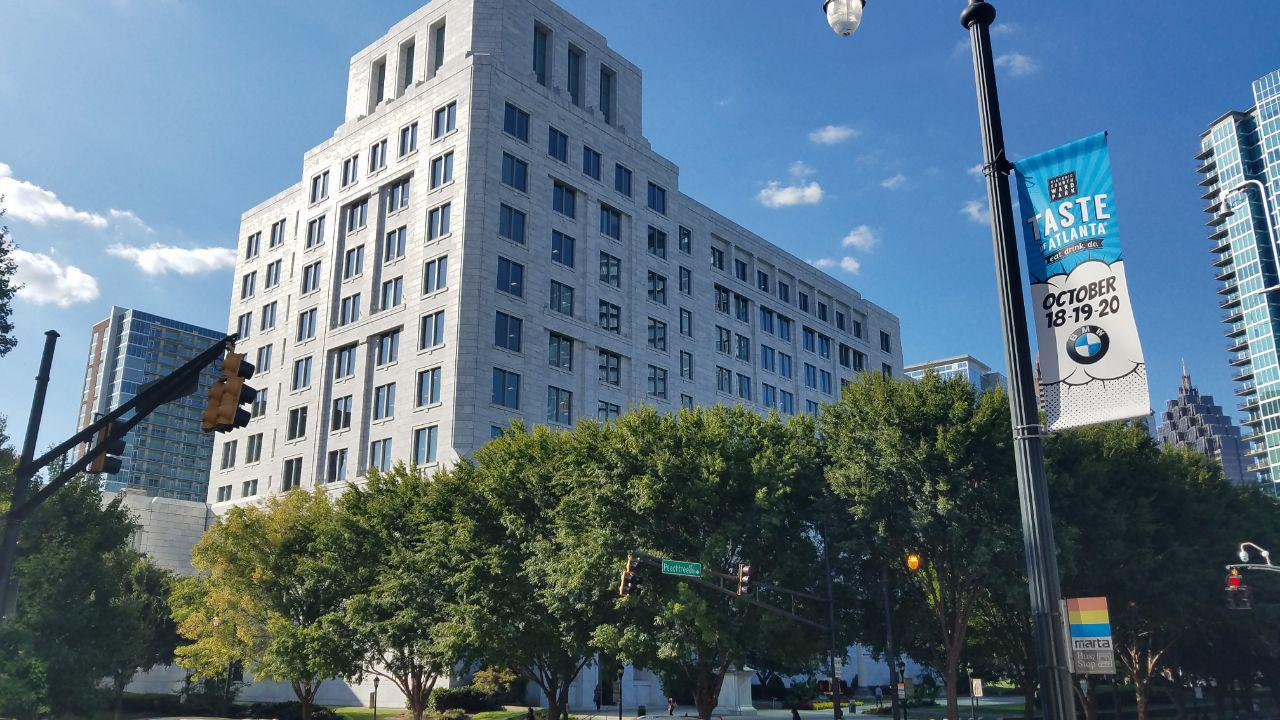
Federal Reserve Bank of Atlanta headquarters in Atlanta, Georgia, US, 2001

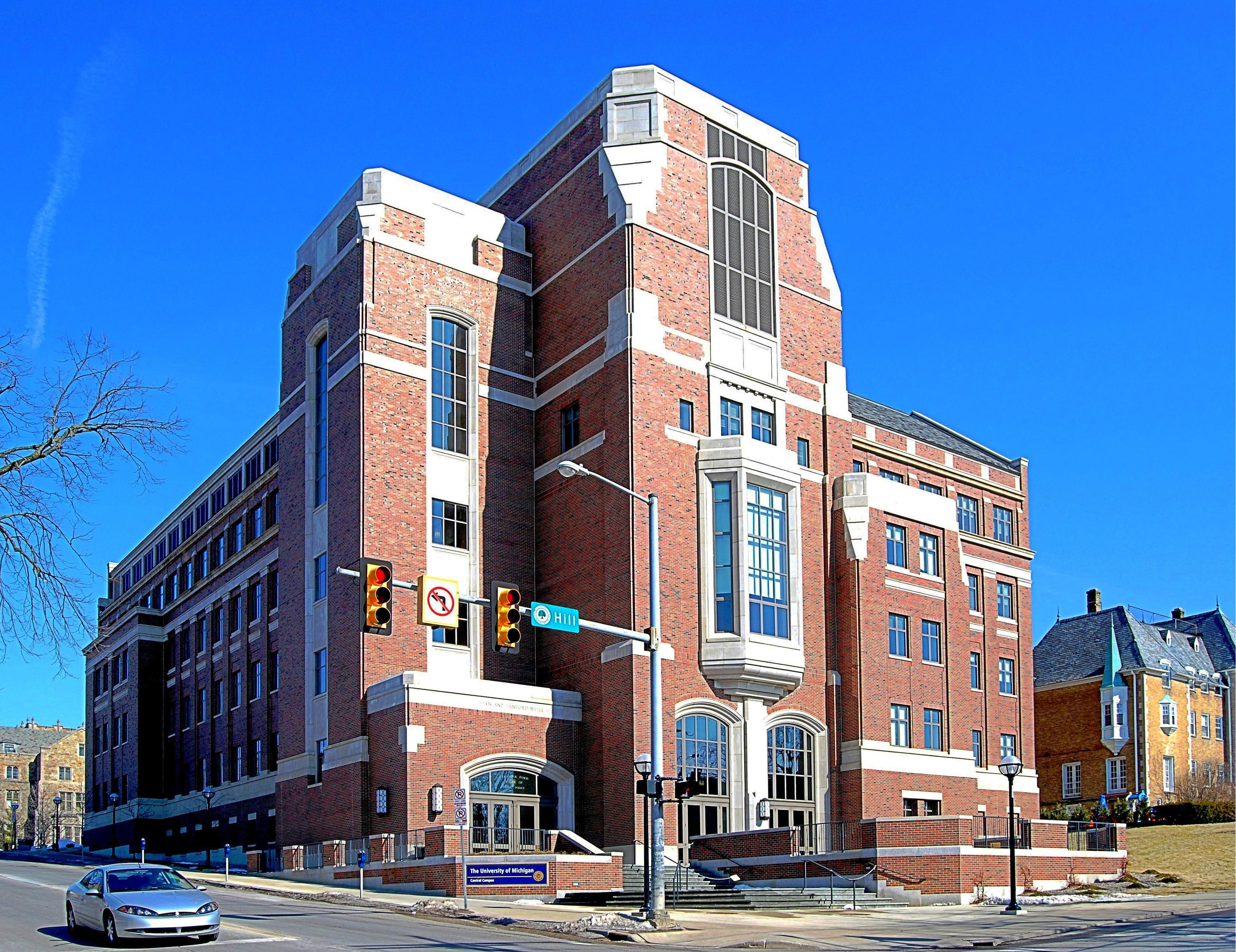
Gerald R. Ford School of Public Policy in Ann Arbor, Michigan, US, 2006

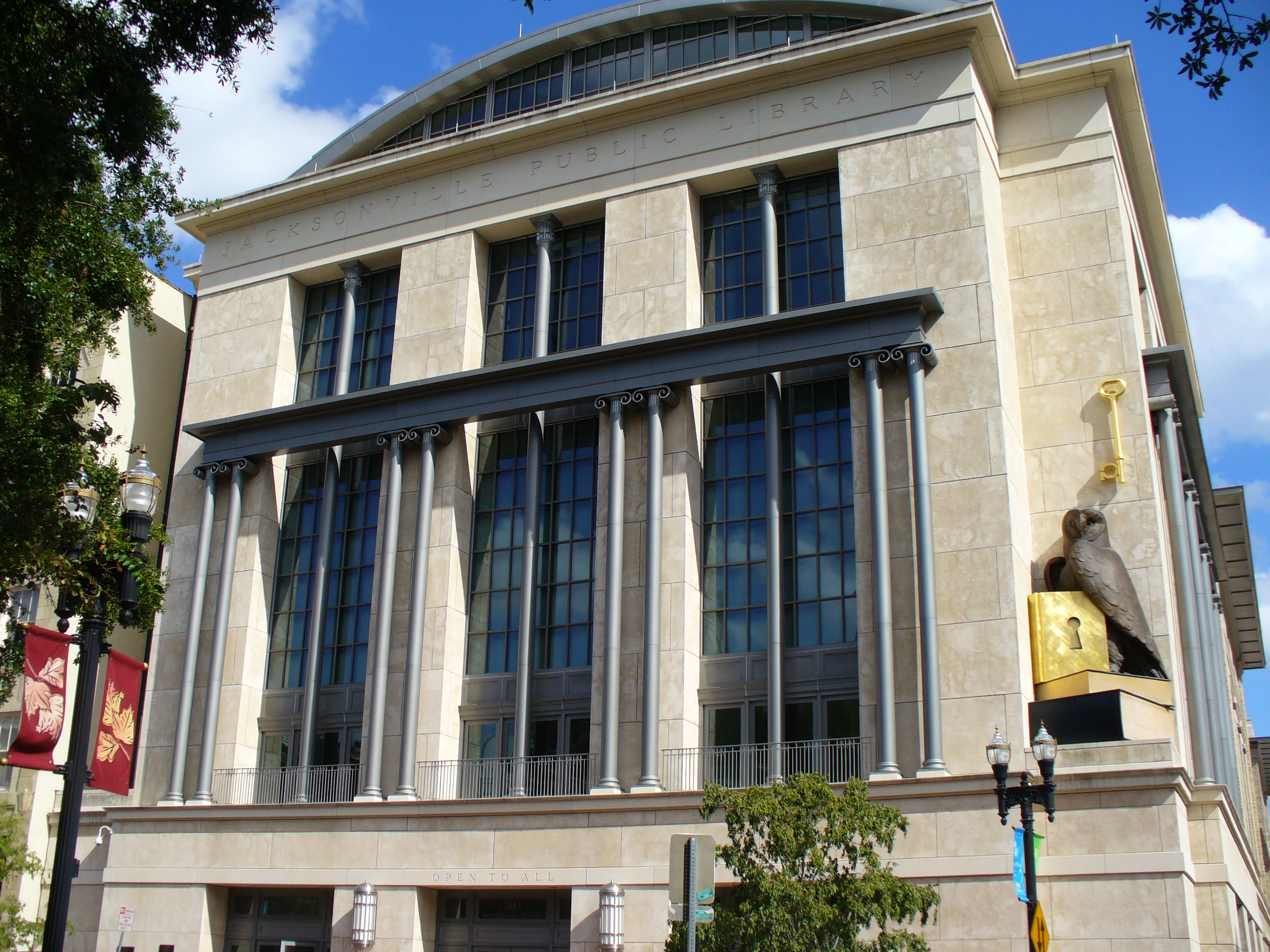
Jacksonville Main Library in Jacksonville, Florida, US, 2005

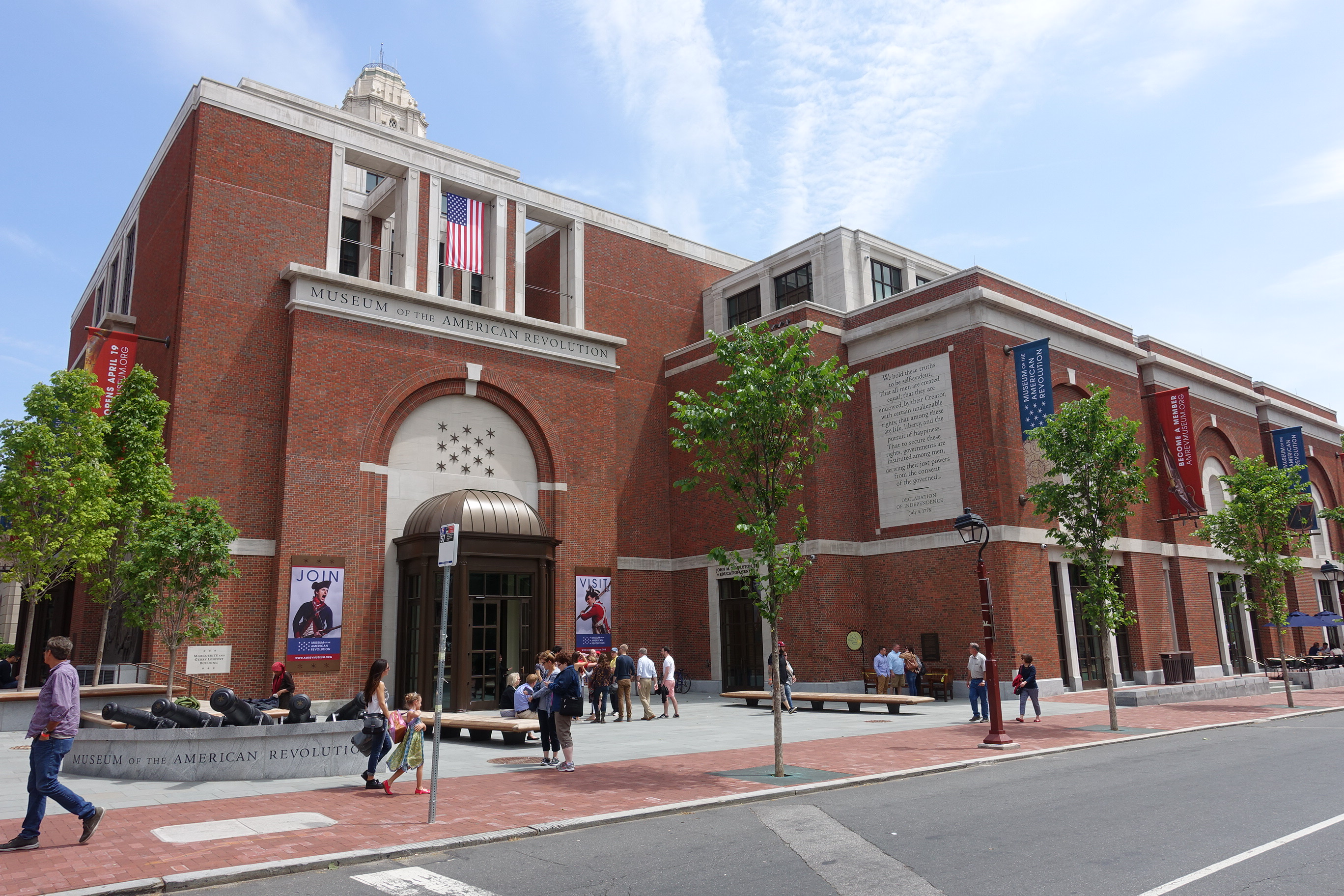
Museum of the American Revolution in Philadelphia, Pennsylvania, US, 2017

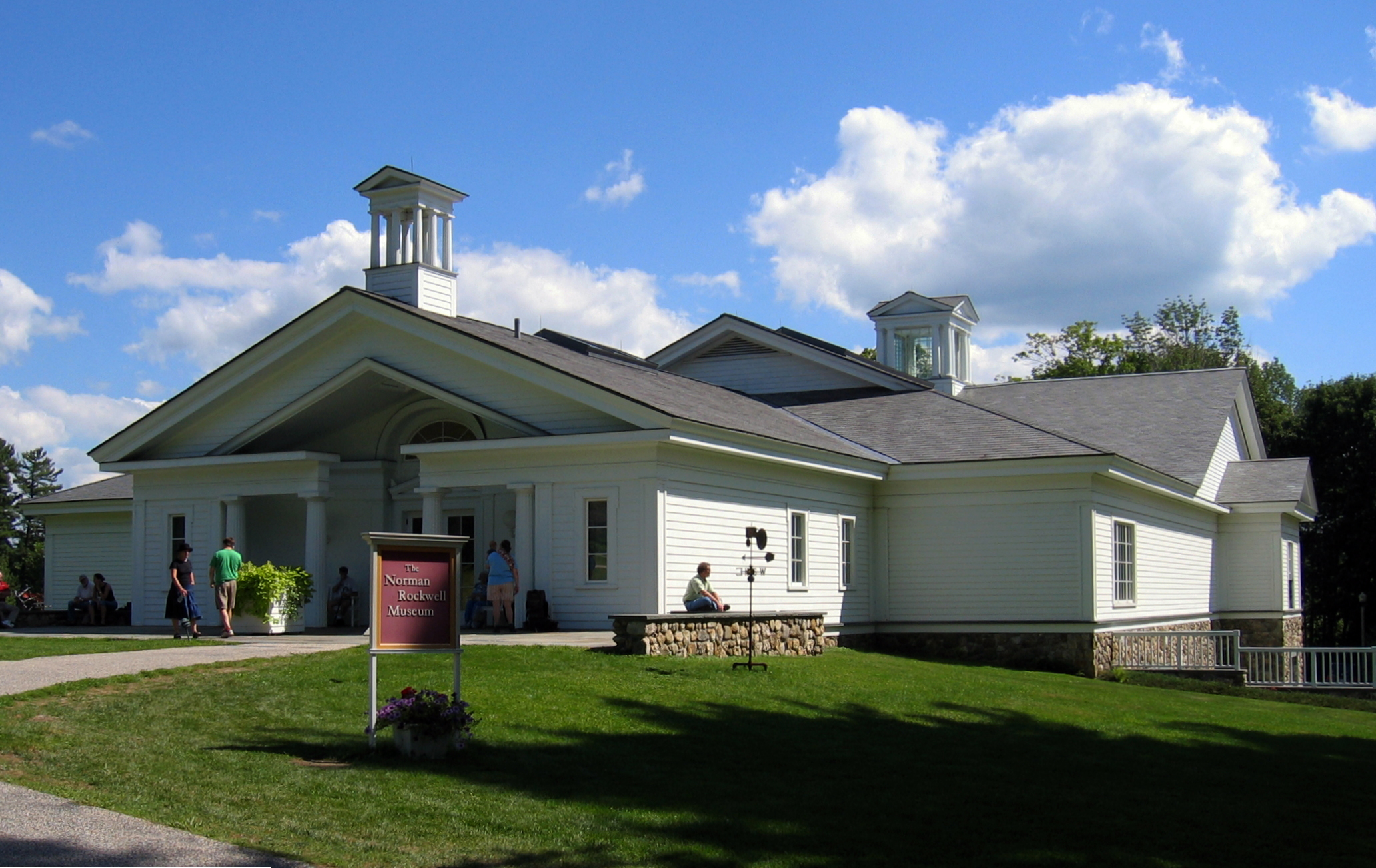
Norman Rockwell Museum in Stockbridge, Massachusetts, US, 1993

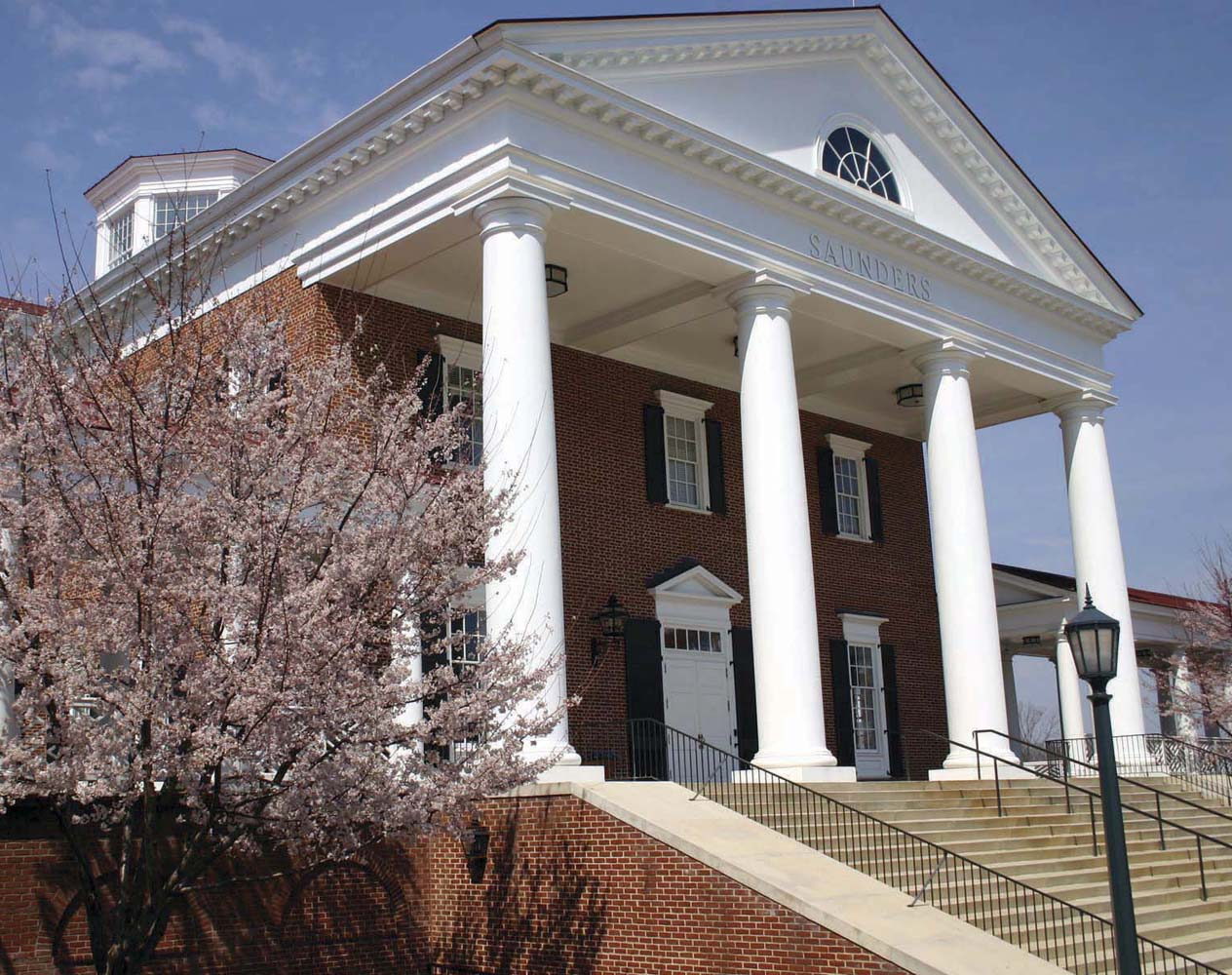
University of Virginia Darden School of Business in Charlottesville, Virginia, US, 1996

== Personal life ==
Stern owned an apartment in The Chatham, a building he designed in New York City. In 1966, he married photographer Lynn Gimbel Solinger, the daughter of David Solinger and the granddaughter of Bernard Gimbel. They had one son, Nicholas S. G. Stern, who manages the boutique construction and planning firm Stern Projects. The couple divorced in 1977.

Stern died from a pulmonary illness in Manhattan, on November 27, 2025, at the age of 86.

== Professional associations and honors ==
Stern was president of the Architectural League of New York from 1973 to 1977; held various roles at the non-profit Institute for Architecture and Urban Studies until its closure in 1985, including visiting fellow and eventually institute trustee; and was a board member of the SOM Foundation beginning in 1985. He was a member of the Council of Advisors for the Institute of Classical Architecture and Art and served on the board of trustees for the National Building Museum. He was elected a member of the American Academy of Arts and Sciences in 2007, and a member of the American Academy of Arts and Letters in 2011.

Other select awards include:

- 1993: Golden Plate Award of the American Academy of Achievement
- 2006: Edmund N. Bacon Prize
- 2007: Board of Directors' Honor, Institute of Classical Architecture & Art
- 2007: Athena Medal from the Congress for the New Urbanism
- 2008: Vincent Scully Prize
- 2010: Historic Districts Council's Landmarks Lion Award
- 2011: Driehaus Architecture Prize
- 2016: Arthur Ross Awards for Excellence in the Classical Tradition, Education
- 2017: Topaz Medallion
- 2019: Louis Auchincloss Prize

== Bibliography ==
A selection of books written and co-written by Stern:

- New Directions in American Architecture (1969, George Braziller 1977), ISBN 978-0-8076-0523-3
- George Howe: Toward a Modern American Architecture (Yale University Press, 1975), ISBN 978-0-300-01642-0
- New York 1900: Metropolitan Architecture and Urbanism 1890–1915 (Rizzoli, 1983), ISBN 978-0-8478-0511-2
- New York 1930: Architecture and Urbanism Between the Two World Wars (Rizzoli, 1987), ISBN 978-0-8478-0618-8
- Modern Classicism (Rizzoli, 1988), ISBN 978-0-8478-0848-9
- Pride of Place: Building the American Dream (Houghton Mifflin, 1986), ISBN 978-0-395-36696-7
- The House That Bob Built (1991), ISBN 978-0-8478-1369-8
- New York 1960: Architecture and Urbanism Between the Second World War and the Bicentennial (Monacelli, 1997), ISBN 978-1-885254-85-6
- New York 1880: Architecture and Urbanism in the Gilded Age (Monacelli, 1999), ISBN 978-1-58093-027-7
- New York 2000: Architecture and Urbanism Between the Bicentennial and the Millennium (Monacelli, 2006), ISBN 978-1-58093-177-9
- The Philip Johnson Tapes: Interviews by Robert A.M. Stern (Monacelli, 2008), ISBN 978-1-58093-214-1
- Paradise Planned: The Garden Suburb and the Modern City (Monacelli, 2013), ISBN 978-1-58093-326-1
- Pedagogy and Place: 100 Years of Architecture Education at Yale (Yale University Press, 2016), ISBN 978-0-300-21192-4
- The New Residential Colleges at Yale: A Conversation Across Time (Monacelli, 2018), ISBN 978-1-58093-504-3
- Between Memory and Invention: My Journey in Architecture (Monacelli, 2022), ISBN 978-1-58093-589-0
- New York 2020: Architecture and Urbanism at the Beginning of a New Century (Monacelli, 2025), ISBN 978-1-58093-694-1
