= Solinger =

Solinger is a surname. Notable people with the surname include:

- Bob Solinger (1925–2014), Canadian ice hockey player
- David Solinger (1906–1996), American lawyer and art collector
- Jamie Solinger (born c.1975), American beauty queen
- Johnny Solinger (1965–2021), American singer
- Rickie Solinger (born 1947), American writer
- Yuri Solinger (born 1979), Dutch speed skater
