= Adam and Sophie Gimbel Design Library =

Coordinates: 40.7352°N 73.9948°W

- Location: New York City, United States of America
- Type: Visual Arts

The Adam and Sophie Gimbel Design Library was the visual arts library of The New School. Used primarily by students in the Parsons division of The New School, it was located in the Sheila Johnson Design Center, in the Greenwich Village neighborhood of Manhattan, New York City.

== Founding and closing ==
Prior to the merging of Parsons with The New School of Social Research in 1970, the library had gone by the name Parsons Design Library. In 1972, the library was renamed after donor Adam Gimbel, and in 1982 there was a re-dedication ceremony to honor both Adam and his wife Sophie. The library was closed on December 20, 2013, when New School opened a new library facility located on the 6th floor of 63 Fifth Avenue.

== Collection ==
Gimbel was the second largest library at the university, with a total of 121,371 holdings. 50,000 book volumes, 200 periodical subscriptions and over 20 art-and-design-specific online database subscriptions. Current New School Libraries include:

- List Center Library
- University Center Library
- Archives and Special Collections

The majority of the Gimbel's old collections were migrated to the University Center Library by the end of 2013.

== See also ==
- Education in New York City
- The New School
- Parsons School of Design
- Gimbels
- The New York Foundation
- Project Pericles
- National Book Award
