= Hank Greenberg =

American baseball player (1911–1986)

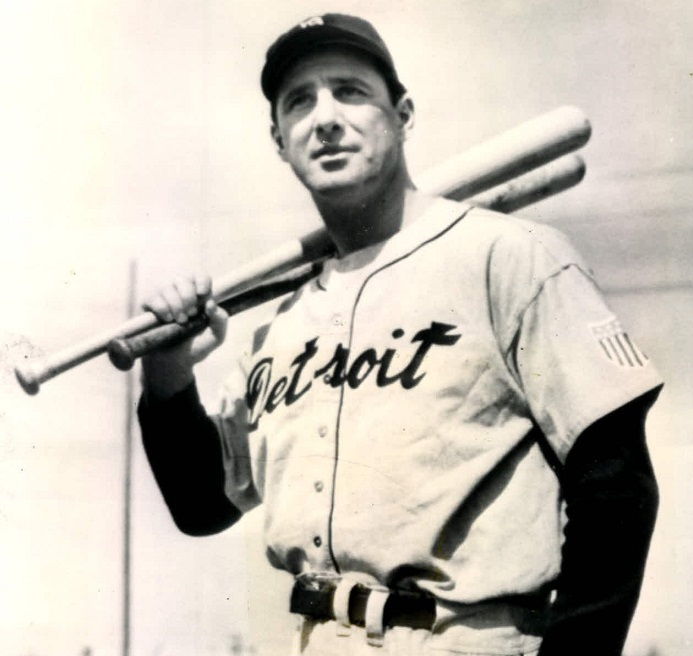
- Greenberg in 1946
- First baseman / Left fielder
- Born: January 1, 1911; Manhattan, New York, U.S.
- Died: September 4, 1986 (aged 75); Beverly Hills, California, U.S.
- Batted: Right Threw: Right

MLB debut
- September 14, 1930, for the Detroit Tigers

Last MLB appearance
- September 18, 1947, for the Pittsburgh Pirates

MLB statistics
- Batting average: .313
- Home runs: 331
- Runs batted in: 1,274
- Stats at Baseball Reference

Teams
- Detroit Tigers (1930, 1933–1941, 1945–1946); Pittsburgh Pirates (1947)

Career highlights and awards
- 5× All-Star (1937–1940, 1945); 2× World Series champion (1935, 1945); 2× AL MVP (1935, 1940); 4× AL home run leader (1935, 1938, 1940, 1946); 4× AL RBI leader (1935, 1937, 1940, 1946); Detroit Tigers No. 5 retired

Member of the National

Baseball Hall of Fame
- Induction: 1956
- Vote: 85.0% (ninth ballot)
Military career
Allegiance	United States
Branch	United States Army; United States Army Air Forces
Service years	1940–1941; 1942–1944
Rank	Captain
Unit	XX Bomber Command
Conflicts	World War II; China-Burma-India Theater
Signature

Henry Benjamin Greenberg (January 1, 1911 – September 4, 1986), nicknamed "Hammerin' Hank", "Hankus Pankus", and "the Hebrew Hammer", was an American professional baseball player and team executive. He played in Major League Baseball (MLB), primarily for the Detroit Tigers as a first baseman in the 1930s and 1940s. A member of the Baseball Hall of Fame and a two-time Most Valuable Player (MVP) Award winner, he was one of the premier power hitters of his generation and is widely considered one of the greatest sluggers in baseball history.

Greenberg played the first twelve of his 13 major league seasons for Detroit; with the Tigers, he was an All-Star for four seasons and was named the American League (AL) Most Valuable Player in 1935 and 1940. He had a batting average over .300 in eight seasons, and won two World Series championships with the Tigers (1935 and 1945). He was the AL home run leader four times and his 58 home runs for the Tigers in 1938 equaled Jimmie Foxx's 1932 mark for the most in one season by anyone other than Babe Ruth, and tied Foxx for the most home runs between Ruth's record 60 in 1927 and Roger Maris' record 61 in 1961. Greenberg was the first major league player to hit 25 or more home runs in a season in each league, and remains the AL record-holder for most runs batted in in a single season by a right-handed batter.

When the United States joined World War II, Greenberg was the first major leaguer to join the armed forces; he spent 47 months in military service, more than any other major league player, all of which took place during what would have been prime years in his major league career. Like many players who served in WWII, his career statistics suffered because of the war and would have certainly been higher had he not served in the armed services during wartime. In 1947, Greenberg signed a contract for a record $85,000 salary before being sold to the Pittsburgh Pirates, where he played his final MLB season that year. After retiring from playing, Greenberg continued to work in baseball as a team executive for the Cleveland Indians and Chicago White Sox.

Greenberg was the first Jewish superstar in American team sports. He attracted national attention in 1934 in the middle of a pennant race when he grappled with the decision of whether or not to play baseball on the Jewish High Holy Days; after consultation with his rabbi, he decided to play on Rosh Hashanah, but refused to play on Yom Kippur, instead spending the day at the synagogue. Having endured his share of antisemitic abuse in his career, Greenberg was one of the few opposing players to publicly welcome African-American player Jackie Robinson to the major leagues in 1947.

== Early life ==
Greenberg was born on January 1, 1911, in Greenwich Village, New York City, to Romanian Jewish immigrant parents from Bucharest, Sarah (née Schwartz) (1881–1951) and David Greenberg (1883–1969). He was the third of four children and had two brothers, Ben (1906–1994) and Joe (1915–2001), and a sister, Lillian (1907–1989). His parents had originally wanted to name him "Hyman"; however, the name on his birth certificate was erroneously listed as "Henry".

The family owned a successful cloth-shrinking plant in New York. Eventually, they moved from Greenwich Village to the Bronx where Greenberg attended James Monroe High School. There, Greenberg was an outstanding all-around athlete and was bestowed with the long-standing nickname of "Bruggy" by his basketball coach. His preferred sport was baseball, and his preferred position was first base. However, his best sport was basketball and he helped the high school basketball team win the city championship. Greenberg also excelled at soccer and track and field.

In 1929, the 18-year-old 6 ft 4 in (1.93 m) Greenberg was recruited by the New York Yankees, who already had Lou Gehrig at first base. As first base was already taken on the Yankee team, Greenberg turned down the Yankees' offer and instead attended New York University on an athletic scholarship; there, he was a member of Sigma Alpha Mu. During this time, he also had a tryout with the New York Giants; Giants manager John McGraw, however, was not impressed by the first baseman. Hence, after his freshman year ended, Greenberg signed with the Detroit Tigers for $9,000 ($173,000 today).

== Professional career ==
=== Minor leagues ===
Greenberg played minor league baseball for three years. He played 17 games in 1930 for the Hartford Senators of the Eastern League before playing the remainder of the year with the Raleigh Capitals of the Piedmont League, hitting .314 with 19 home runs. In 1931, he played for the Evansville Hubs in the Illinois–Indiana–Iowa League, hitting .318 with 15 home runs and 85 runs batted in. In 1932, the Beaumont Exporters in the Texas League, he hit 39 homers with 131 RBIs, winning the league's Most Valuable Player award, and leading Beaumont to the Texas League title.

=== Major leagues ===
==== Early years ====
On September 14, 1930, Greenberg made his major league debut as a pinch hitter against the New York Yankees. It was the only game he appeared in that year but, as a result, made him the youngest player (19) to appear in the major leagues in 1930. It was another three years before he rejoined the majors. In 1933, for the Tigers, Greenberg hit .301 with 87 runs batted in. At the same time, he was third in the league in strikeouts (78).

In 1934, his second season in the majors, Greenberg hit .339 and helped the Tigers reach their first World Series in 25 years. He led the league in doubles, with 63 (the fourth-highest all-time in a single season), and extra-base hits (96). Additionally, he was third in the AL in slugging percentage (.600) – behind Jimmie Foxx and Lou Gehrig, but ahead of Babe Ruth – and in RBIs (139), sixth in batting average (.339), seventh in home runs (26), and ninth in on-base percentage (.404).

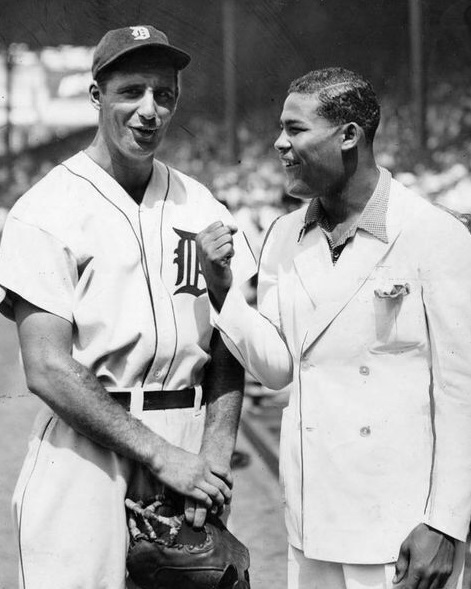
Greenberg and heavyweight boxer Joe Louis in 1935

Late in the 1934 season, he announced that he would not play on September 10, which was Rosh Hashanah, the Jewish New Year, or on September 19, the Day of Atonement, Yom Kippur. Detroit fans grumbled at the decision, however, with one reportedly saying, "Rosh Hashanah comes every year but the Tigers haven't won the pennant since 1909." As a result, Greenberg did considerable soul-searching, and discussed the matter with his rabbi and his father; finally he relented and agreed to play on Rosh Hashanah, but stuck with his decision not to play on Yom Kippur. Dramatically, Greenberg hit two home runs in a 2–1 Tigers victory over the Red Sox on Rosh Hashanah. The next day, the Detroit Free Press ran the Hebrew lettering for "Happy New Year" across its front page.

Columnist and poet Edgar A. Guest expressed the general opinion in a poem titled "Came Yom Kippur: Speaking of Greenberg", in which he used the Irish (and thus Catholic) names Murphy and Mulroney. The poem, published in the Detroit Free Press, ends with the lines:

We shall miss him on the infield and shall miss him at the bat.
But he's true to his religion – and I honor him for that!

The Detroit press was not so kind regarding the Yom Kippur decision, nor were many fans, but Greenberg in his autobiography recalled that he received a standing ovation from congregants at Congregation Shaarey Zedek when he arrived. With Greenberg absent from the lineup, the Tigers lost to the New York Yankees 5–2. They went on to face the St. Louis Cardinals in the 1934 World Series, losing in seven games against the "Gashouse Gang".

In 1935, Greenberg led the league in RBIs (168), total bases (389), and extra base hits (98), tied Foxx for the AL title in home runs (36), was 2nd in the league in doubles (46), slugging percentage (.628), was 3rd in the league in triples (16), and in runs scored (121), 6th in on-base percentage (.411) and walks (87), and was 7th in batting average (.328). He was unanimously voted as the Most Valuable Player in the American League. By the All-Star break that season, Greenberg had hit 25 home runs and set an MLB record (still standing) of 103 RBIs, but was not selected to the AL All-Star roster; one reason was that AL manager Mickey Cochrane had put himself on the All-Star roster despite eventually not playing in the game.

That season, Greenberg led the Tigers to another pennant. However, during Game 2, he sprained his wrist and was sidelined for the remainder of the series as the Tigers won their first World Series title.

In April 1936, Greenberg re-injured his wrist in a collision with Jake Powell of the Washington Senators and did not play the remainder of the season. He finished the season with 16 hits, 1 home run, and 15 RBIs in 12 games.

In 1937, Greenberg recovered from his injury and was voted to the AL All-Star roster, but did not play. On September 19, 1937, he hit the first home run into the center-field bleachers at Yankee Stadium. He led the AL by driving in 184 runs (third all-time, behind Hack Wilson in 1930 and Lou Gehrig in 1931), and in extra-base hits (103), while batting .337 with 200 hits. He was second in the league in home runs (40), doubles (49), total bases (397), slugging percentage (.668), and walks (102), third in on-base percentage (.436), and seventh in batting average (.337). Greenberg came in third in the vote for MVP, behind teammate Charlie Gehringer and Joe DiMaggio.

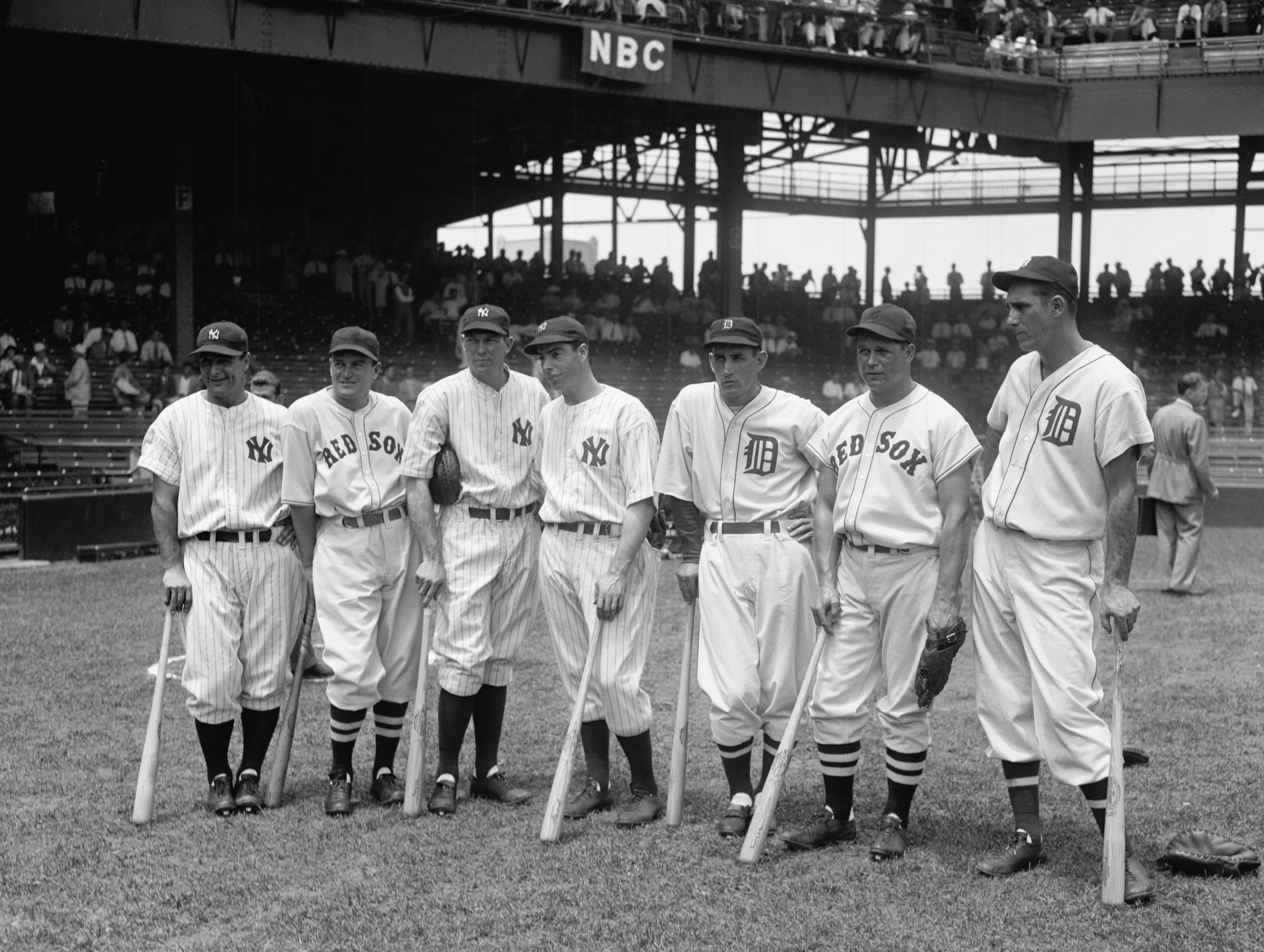
Seven of the American League's 1937 All-Star players, from left to right: Lou Gehrig, Joe Cronin, Bill Dickey, Joe DiMaggio, Charlie Gehringer, Jimmie Foxx, and Greenberg. All seven would eventually be elected to the Hall of Fame.

A prodigious home run hitter, Greenberg narrowly missed breaking Babe Ruth's single-season home run record in 1938, when he hit 58 home runs, leading the league for the second time. That year, he had 11 games with multiple home runs, a new major league record. Greenberg matched what was then the single-season home run record by a right-handed batter, (Jimmie Foxx, 1932); the mark stood for 66 years until it was broken by Sammy Sosa and Mark McGwire in 1998. It remained the AL single season record by a right handed hitter until Aaron Judge surpassed it in 2022. Greenberg also had a 59th home run washed away in a rainout. It has been long speculated that Greenberg was intentionally walked late in the season to prevent him from breaking Ruth's record, but Greenberg dismissed this speculation, calling it "crazy stories". Howard Megdal has calculated that in September 1938, Greenberg was walked in over 20% of his plate appearances, above his average for the season. Baseball historian Ron Kaplan, while not dismissing antisemitism's role in Greenberg's decreased home run rate, states that there was nothing different in the way Greenberg was pitched to in the final days of the 1938 season.

Greenberg was again voted to the AL All-Star roster in 1938, but because he was not named to the 1935 AL All-Star roster and was benched in the 1937 game, he declined to accept a starting position on the 1938 AL team and did not play (the NL won 4–1). He led the league in runs scored (144) and at-bats per home run (9.6), tied for the AL lead in walks (119), was second in RBIs (146), slugging percentage (.683), and total bases (380), and third in OBP (.438) and set a still-standing major league record of 39 homers in his home park, the newly re-configured Briggs Stadium. He also set a major-league record with 11 multiple-home run games and came in third in the vote for MVP, behind Jimmie Foxx and Bill Dickey.

In 1939, Greenberg was voted to the AL All-Star roster for the third year in a row and was a starter at first base, and singled and walked in four at-bats (AL won 3–1). He finished second in the AL in home runs (33) and strikeouts (95), third in doubles (42) and slugging percentage (.622), fourth in RBIs (112), sixth in walks (91), and ninth in on-base percentage (.420).

After the 1939 season ended, Greenberg was asked by general manager Jack Zeller to take a salary cut of $5,000 ($116,000 today) as a result of his off-year in power and run production. He was asked to move from first base to left field to accommodate Rudy York, who was one of the best young hitters of his generation; York was tried at catcher, third baseman, and outfielder and proved to be a defensive liability at each position. Greenberg in turn, demanded a $10,000 bonus if he mastered left field, insisting he was the one taking the risk in learning a new position. Greenberg received his bonus at the end of spring training.

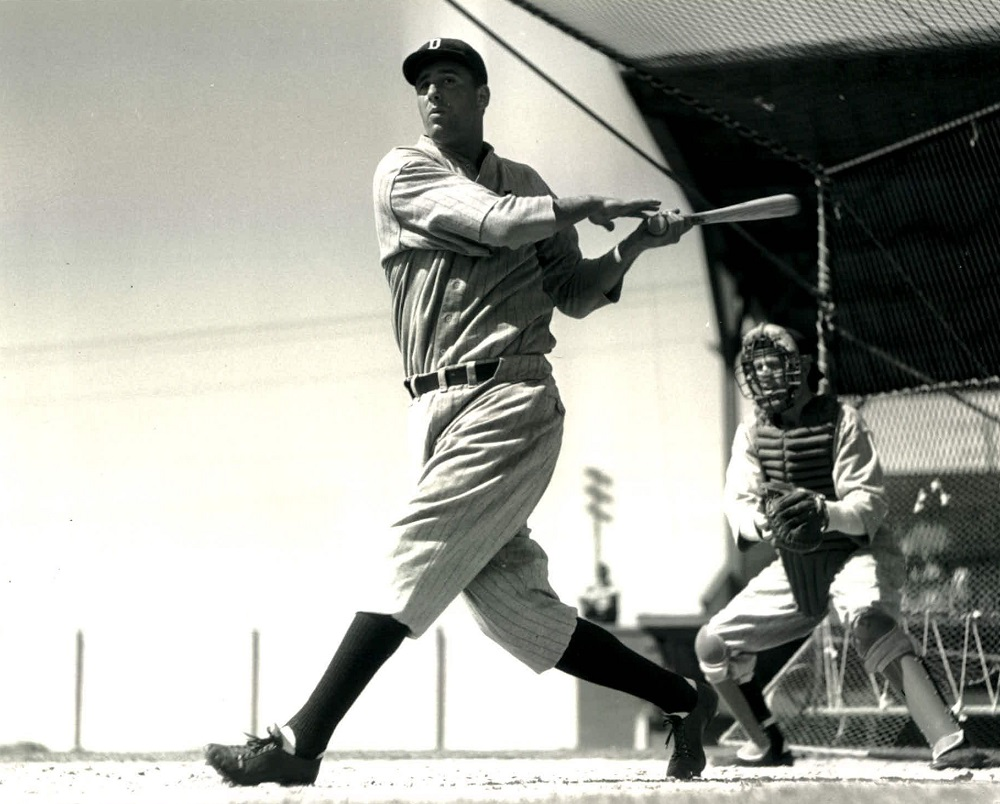
Hank Greenberg in action for the Detroit Tigers in 1940

In 1940, Greenberg switched from playing the first base position to the left field position. For the fourth consecutive time, he was voted by the season's American All-Star team manager Joe McCarthy to the AL All-Star team. In the bottom of the sixth inning, Greenberg and Lou Finney were sent into the game to replace right fielder Charlie Keller and left fielder Ted Williams, with Greenberg playing in left field and Finney in right field. Greenberg batted twice in the game and fouled out to the catcher twice. The NL won the game 4–0, the first All-Star Game shutout.

That season, Greenberg led the AL in home runs for the third time in six years with 41; in RBIs (150), doubles (50), total bases (384), extra-base hits (99), at-bats per home run (14.0), and slugging percentage (.670; 44 points ahead of Joe DiMaggio). Greenberg finished second in the league to Williams in runs scored (129) and OBP (.433), all while batting .340 (fifth-best in the AL). He also led the Tigers to the AL pennant, and won his second AL MVP award, becoming the first player in major-league history to win an MVP award at two different playing positions. However, the Tigers subsequently lost the 1940 World Series against the Cincinnati Reds in seven games.

Greenberg admitted in his autobiography after his career ended that he had taken part in sign stealing in September 1940 season, which was inspired by teammates Tommy Bridges and Pinky Higgins, who noticed that the new rifle they used for their hunt had a telescopic lens that could read signs when in the stands in the outfield. He also said that sign stealing was going on in the 1948 Cleveland Indians and the 1959 Chicago White Sox teams.

==== World War II service ====
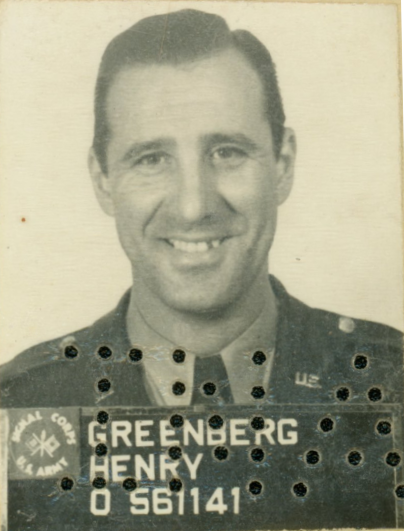
Greenberg's military ID photo

On October 16, 1940, Greenberg became the first American League player to register for the nation's first peacetime draft. In the spring of 1941, the Detroit draft board initially classified Greenberg as 4F for "flat feet" after his first physical for military service, and he was recommended for light duty. The rumors that he had bribed the board, and concern that he would be likened to Jack Dempsey (who had received negative publicity for failure to serve in World War I), led Greenberg to request to be reexamined. On April 18, he was found fit for regular military service and was reclassified.

On May 7, 1941, he was inducted into the U.S. Army after playing left field in 19 games, and reported to Fort Custer at Battle Creek, Michigan. His salary was cut from $55,000 ($1,264,000 today) a year to $21 ($500 today) a month. In November, while serving as an anti-tank gunner, he was promoted to sergeant, but was honorably discharged on December 5 (the United States Congress released men aged 28 years and older from service), two days before Japan bombed Pearl Harbor.

After the bombing of Pearl Harbor and the United States officially joining the war effort, Greenberg re-enlisted as a sergeant on February 1, 1942, and volunteered for service in the Army Air Forces, becoming the first major league player to do so. He graduated from Officer Candidate School and was commissioned as a first lieutenant in the Air Corps (the new "Air Force" service retained the old name for its own logistics and training elements) and was assigned to the Physical Education Program.

On August 26, 1943, Greenberg participated in a war bond game at the Polo Grounds that generated $800 million in war bond pledges.

In February 1944, he was sent to the U.S. Army Special Services school. Promoted to captain, he requested overseas duty later that year and served in the China-Burma-India Theater for over six months, scouting locations for B-29 bomber bases and was a physical training officer with the 58th Bomber Wing. He was a Special Services officer of the 20th Bomber Command, 20th Air Force in China when it began bombing Japan on June 15. He was then ordered to New York, where he accompanied small groups of returning combat officers on visits to war plants throughout New England to deliver morale-boosting talks to workers. In late 1944, he was transferred to Richmond, Virginia. Greenberg served 47 months, the longest of any major league player.

==== Return to baseball ====
Greenberg remained in military uniform until he was placed on the military inactive list and discharged from the U.S. Army on June 14, 1945. He was the first major league player to return to the majors after the war. In his first game back on July 1, he hit a home run. The 1945 All-Star Game, scheduled for July 10, had been officially cancelled on April 24 and Major League Baseball did not name All-Stars that season due to strict travel restrictions in place during the last days of the war. In place of the All-Star Game, seven interleague games were played on July 9 and 10 to benefit the American Red Cross and the War Relief fund. An Associated Press All-Star roster was named for the AL and NL by a group of their sportswriters that included Greenberg as one of the All-Stars.

Greenberg, who played left field in 72 games and batted .311 in 1945, helped lead the Tigers to a come-from-behind American League pennant, clinching it with a dramatic grand slam home run in the ninth inning on the final day of the season against the St. Louis Browns, avoiding a one-game playoff against the now-second-place Washington Senators. The Tigers went on to beat the Cubs in the 1945 World Series in seven games. Greenberg hit two of the only three home runs hit in that World Series, with Phil Cavarretta hitting one for the Cubs in Game 1. Greenberg homered in Game 2, where he batted in three runs in a 4–1 Tigers win, and hit a two-run homer in the eighth inning of Game 6 that tied the score 8–8; the Cubs went on to win that game with a run in the bottom of the 12th.

In 1946, he returned to peak form and playing at first base. He led the AL in home runs (44) and RBIs (127), both for the fourth time. He was second in slugging percentage (.604) and total bases (316) behind Ted Williams.

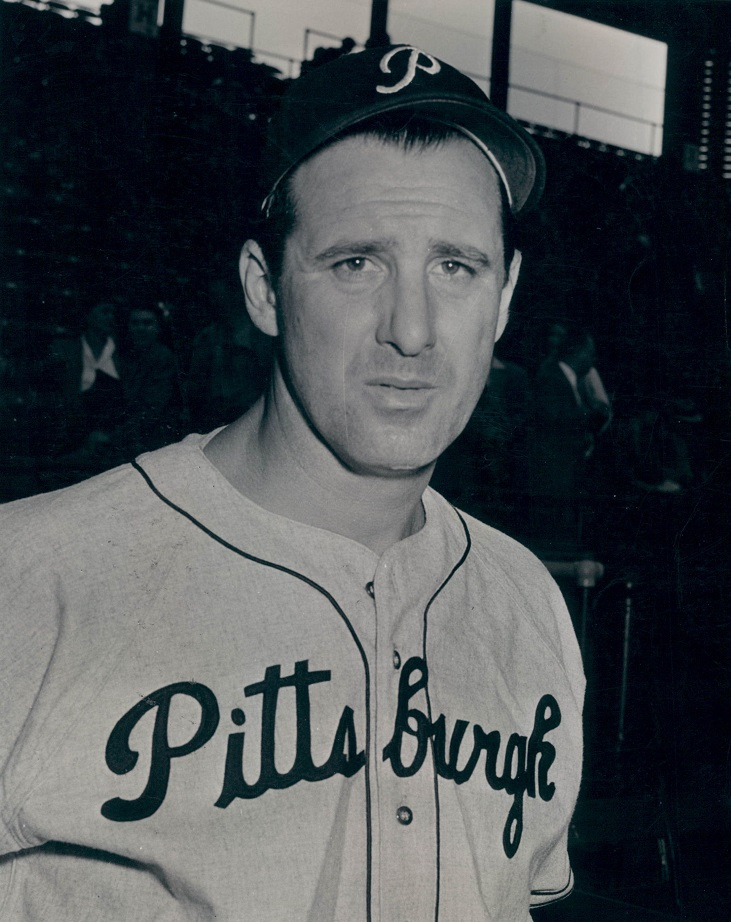
Greenberg with the Pirates in 1947

In 1947, Greenberg and the Tigers had a lengthy salary dispute. When Greenberg decided to retire rather than play for less, Detroit sold his contract to the Pittsburgh Pirates. To persuade him not to retire, Pittsburgh made Greenberg the first baseball player to make $100,000 in a season as pure salary. Team co-owner Bing Crosby recorded a song, "Goodbye, Mr. Ball, Goodbye" with Groucho Marx and Greenberg to celebrate Greenberg's arrival. The Pirates also reduced the size of Forbes Field's cavernous left field, renaming the section "Greenberg Gardens" to accommodate Greenberg's pull-hitting style.

Greenberg played first base for the Pirates in 1947 and his time there coincided with the arrival of Jackie Robinson in the Major Leagues. He was one of the few opposing players to publicly welcome Robinson to the majors at a time when most opposing players were openly hostile. Greenberg himself had faced hostilities from opposing players and spectators who often shouted antisemitic slurs at him during games and, hence, knew what Robinson was going through. During a game against the Brooklyn Dodgers, he collided with Robinson while covering first base. Afterwards, Greenberg asked if Robinson was alright and encouraged him to "Stick in there. You're doing fine. Keep your chin up." Robinson later praised Greenberg, saying, "Class tells. It sticks out all over Mr. Greenberg."

That year he also had a chance to mentor a young future Hall-of-Famer, the 24-year-old Ralph Kiner. Greenberg was impressed by the rookie, later saying of him, "Ralph had a natural home run swing. All he needed was somebody to teach him the value of hard work and self-discipline. Early in the morning on off-days, every chance we got, we worked on hitting." Kiner hit 51 home runs that year to lead the National League and ended his career with 369 home runs, eventually being elected to the Baseball Hall of Fame.

In his final season of 1947, Greenberg tied for the league lead in walks with 104, with a .408 on-base percentage and finished eighth in the league in home runs and tenth in slugging percentage. Greenberg became the first major league player to hit 25 or more home runs in a season in each league. Despite still being productive, Greenberg decided to retire as a player to take a front-office post with the Cleveland Indians. No player had ever retired after a final season in which they hit so many home runs. Since then, only Ted Williams (1960; 29), Dave Kingman (1986; 35), Mark McGwire (2001; 29), Barry Bonds (2007; 28) and David Ortiz (2016; 38) have hit as many or more homers in their final season.

== Player profile ==
=== Career overall ===
He was one of the truly great hitters, and when I first saw him at bat, he made my eyes pop out.

— Joe DiMaggio.

It is speculated that, had it not been for his service in World War II, Greenberg would have approached 500 home runs and 1,800 RBIs; he missed all but 19 games of the 1941 season, the three full seasons that followed, and most of 1945 to World War II military service.

Starring as a first baseman and left fielder with the Tigers (1930, 1933–46) and doing duty only briefly with the Pirates (1947), Greenberg played nine full seasons. He compiled 331 home runs, 1,046 runs and 1,274 RBIs in 1,394 games. Greenberg was also an excellent contact hitter, earning a lifetime batting average of .313. During his career, he was named to the All-Star Team four times, and won the AL Most Valuable Player Award twice, in 1935 and 1940.

As a fielder, the 6 ft 4 in (1.93 m) Greenberg was awkward and unsure of himself early in his career, but mastered first base through countless hours of practice. Over the course of his career he demonstrated a higher-than-average fielding percentage and range at first base. When asked by the Tigers' front office to move to left field in 1940 to make room for Rudy York, he worked tirelessly to master that position as well, reducing his errors in the outfield from 15 in 1940 to 0 in 1945.

Category	G	AB	R	H	2B	3B	HR	RBI	SB	CS	BB	SO	BA	OBP	SLG	OPS	PO	A	E	DP	FLD%	Ref.
Total	1,394	5,193	1,046	1,628	379	71	331	1,274	58	30	852	844	.313	.412	.605	1.017	11,023	741	122	974	.990	

In 23 World Series games, Greenberg batted .318 (27-for-85) with 17 runs scored, 7 doubles, 2 triples, 5 home runs, 22 RBI and 13 walks.

=== Antisemitism ===
During his career, Greenberg faced a number of antisemitic incidents, racial slurs from both spectators and opposing players. Other players sometimes stared because they had never before seen a Jew. According to sportswriter Ross Newhan, Greenberg may have encountered more bigotry over his career than any player other than Jackie Robinson. Greenberg sometimes retaliated against the racial attacks, once going into the Chicago White Sox clubhouse and challenging manager Jimmy Dykes to a fight. On another occasion he called out the entire Yankees team, daring the perpetrator to reveal himself.

In the 1935 World Series, umpire George Moriarty warned three Chicago Cubs players to stop yelling antisemitic slurs at Greenberg and eventually cleared the players from the Cubs bench. Moriarty was disciplined for this action by then-commissioner Kenesaw Mountain Landis.

Greenberg initially resented being singled out as a Jewish ballplayer and, unlike his parents, was not a particularly observant Jew. However, he later accepted his place in baseball, saying:

When I was playing, I used to resent being singled out as a Jewish ballplayer. I wanted to be known as a great ballplayer, period. I'm not sure why or when I changed, because I'm still not a particularly religious person. Lately, though, I find myself wanting to be remembered not only as a great ballplayer, but even more as a great Jewish ballplayer.

In his autobiography, Greenberg wrote that he used the antisemitism that he faced as a source of motivation. At 6 ft 4 in (1.93 m) and towering above his contemporaries, he disproved the commonly held stereotype that Jews were not athletic and did not belong in sports. His decision to not play on Yom Kippur at a time of rampant antisemitism in the United States, and around the world, was significant and made him a hero in the American Jewish community. Sandy Koufax, who did not play in Game 1 of the 1965 World Series because it fell on Yom Kippur, has often pointed out that his decision to not play was not unprecedented: "Hank Greenberg did it first."

== Post-playing career ==
=== Management and ownership ===
After the 1947 season, Greenberg retired as a player, and Cleveland Indians owner Bill Veeck hired him as the Indians' farm director. When Veeck was forced to sell the Indians due to a divorce settlement, new owner Ellis Ryan retained Greenberg, promoting him to general manager.

During his tenure, he sponsored more African American players than any other major league executive. Greenberg's contributions to the Cleveland farm system led to the team's successes throughout the 1950s, although Bill James once wrote that the Indians' late 1950s collapse should also be attributed to him. In 1949, Larry Doby also recommended Greenberg scout three players Doby used to play with in the Negro leagues: Hank Aaron, Ernie Banks, and Willie Mays. The next offseason Doby asked what Indians' scouts said about his recommendations. Greenberg replied: "Our guys checked 'em out and their reports were not good. They said that Aaron has a hitch in his swing and will never hit good pitching. Banks is too slow and didn't have enough range [at shortstop], and Mays can't hit a curveball."

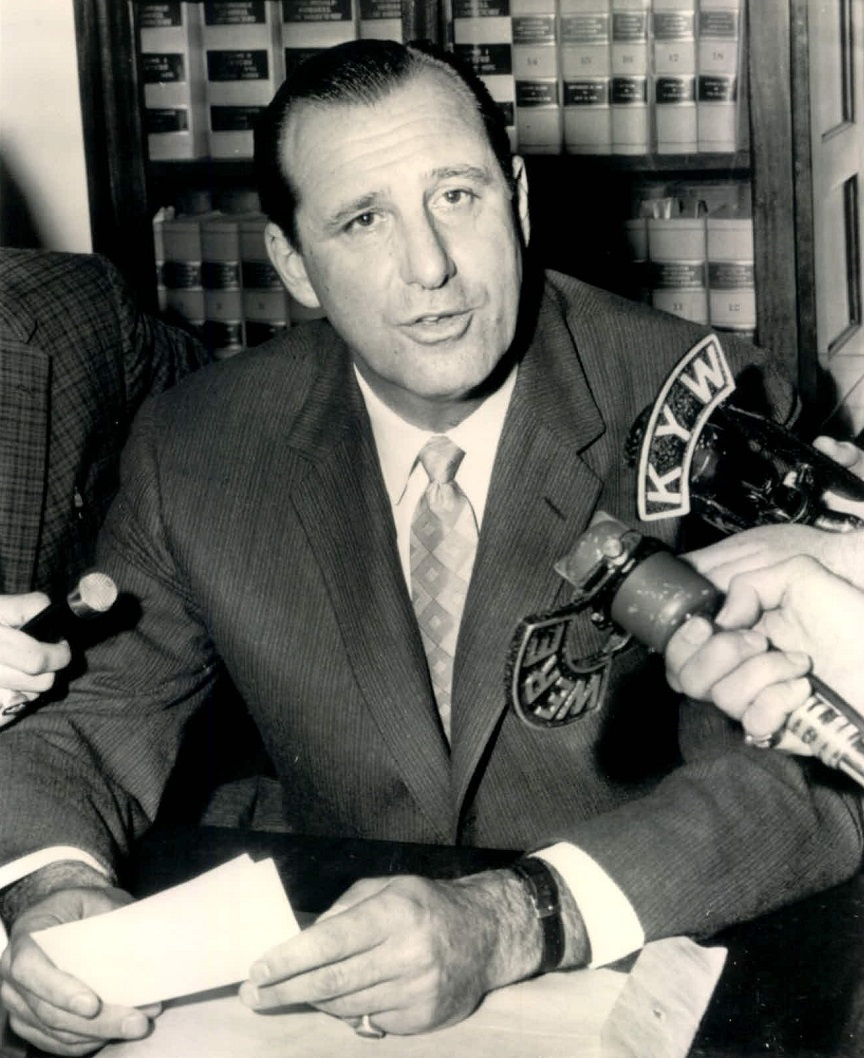
Greenberg as general manager of the Cleveland Indians in 1957

While Ryan had initially been content to leave baseball matters to Greenberg, he tried to seize greater control after the 1952 season, when the Indians suffered a drop in attendance despite coming within two games of the pennant. The Indians board sided with Greenberg, prompting Ryan to sell out to a group headed by Myron H. Wilson, who voiced full confidence in Greenberg. Under Wilson, Greenberg's role as operating head of the franchise was cemented to the point that he represented the Indians at owners meetings alongside vice president and board member George Medinger. During this time, he and Pirates owner John W. Galbreath helped negotiate an amended player pension plan in which the players got 60% of television revenues from the All-Star Game and World Series.

In 1953, he was partly responsible for an important change to baseball's waivers rule. In previous seasons, once a player passed through waivers in his team's league (AL or NL), any team from the other league could acquire him, a detail the Yankees used to often outbid other AL teams for NL players. Greenberg successfully campaigned for a new rule that, after June 15, required players to pass through waivers in both leagues before teams in the other league could attempt to obtain them.

Greenberg's influence grew even more in 1956 when he joined a syndicate headed by Bill Daley that bought the Indians from Wilson. Although Greenberg had been operating head of the franchise since 1950, this was the first time that he had been a part-owner. However, in 1957, he was forced to resign as general manager, as he put it, "in order to satisfy a hostile press." He remained a part-owner, however, and in 1958 tried to buy out Daley and become principal owner. He intended to serve as his own general manager if successful. However, Daley and several other directors bought him out.

In 1959, Greenberg and Veeck teamed up for a second time when they led a syndicate that purchased the Chicago White Sox; Veeck served as team president with Greenberg as vice president and general manager. During Veeck and Greenberg's first season, the White Sox won their first AL pennant since 1919. Veeck would sell his shares in the White Sox in 1961, and Greenberg stepped down as general manager on August 26 of that season.

After the 1960 season, the American League announced plans to put a team in Los Angeles. Greenberg immediately became the favorite to become the new team's first owner and persuaded Veeck to join him as his partner. However, when Los Angeles Dodgers owner Walter O'Malley got wind of these developments, he threatened to scuttle the whole deal by invoking his exclusive rights to operate a major league team in southern California. In truth, O'Malley wanted no part of competing against an expansion team owned by a master promoter such as Veeck, even if he was only a minority partner. Greenberg wouldn't budge and pulled out of the running for what became the Los Angeles Angels. Greenberg later became a successful investment banker, briefly returning to baseball as a minority partner with Veeck when the latter repurchased the White Sox in 1975. For instance, in 1965, he participated with a group of investors in returning bankrupt Overseas National Airways to operation.

In 1970, when St. Louis Cardinals outfielder Curt Flood challenged Major League Baseball's reserve clause, Greenberg was amongst the few baseball players to openly support him, and testified on his behalf.

== Personal life ==
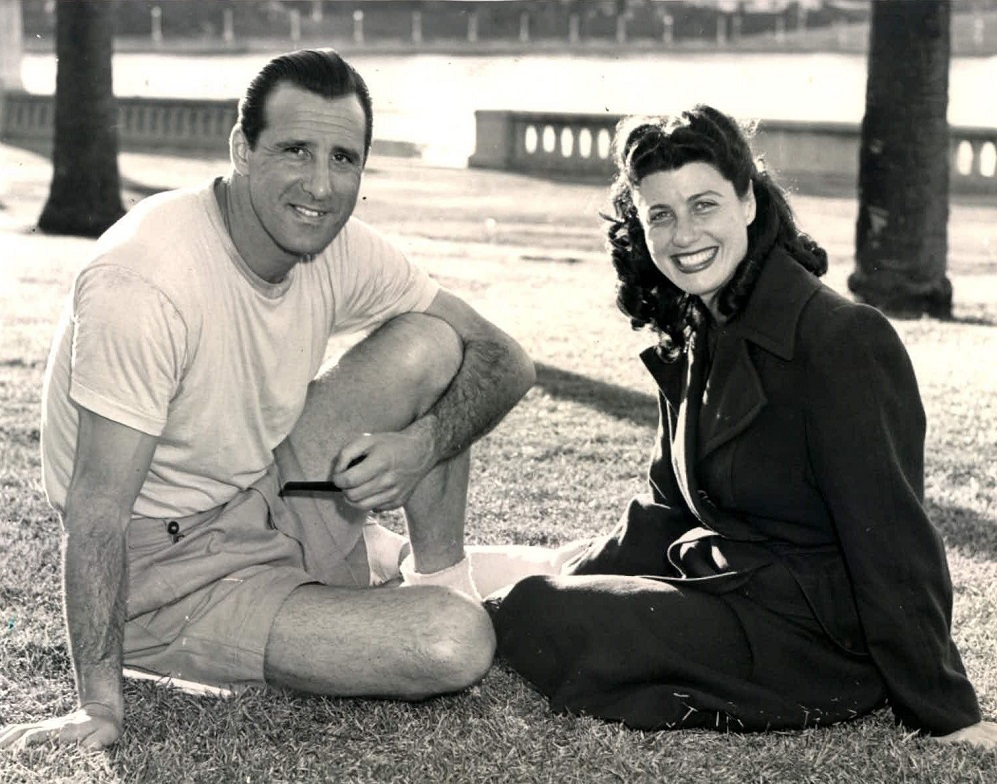
Greenberg with his first wife Caral Gimbel in Lakeland, Florida

While he grew up in an Orthodox Jewish household, Greenberg himself was not an observant Jew and later raised his children in a secular household.

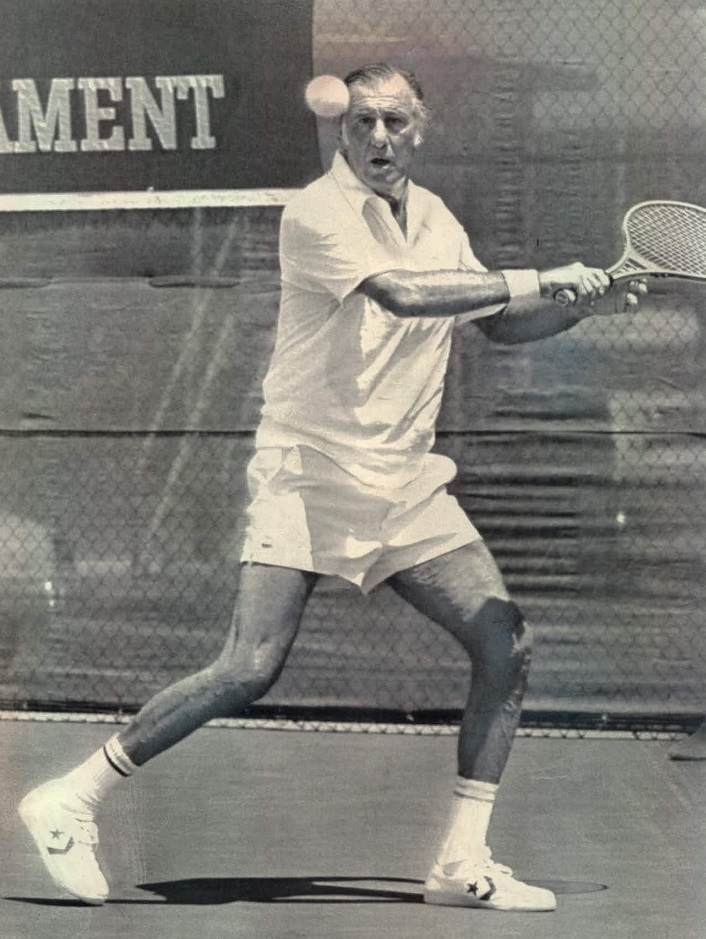
Greenberg playing tennis, c. 1978

During his early baseball career, he would also play professional basketball for a few different teams across multiple seasons of play. Most notably from that brief period of time as a basketball player, he would play for the Brooklyn Americans from the briefly revived Metropolitan Basketball League and the Trenton Moose from the (briefly) revived Eastern Basketball League during the 1932–33 season. The latter team would win the EBL's championship over the legendary Philadelphia Sphas, a Jewish-based basketball team run by Naismith Basketball Hall of Famer Eddie Gottlieb, though Greenberg would not be a part of Trenton's championship series roster by that time.

In 1946, Greenberg married Caral Gimbel, daughter of Bernard Gimbel of the Gimbels department store family. The marriage was not a happy one, however, and they eventually divorced in 1958. In 1966, Greenberg married actress Mary Jo Tarola, who appeared on-screen under the stage name "Linda Douglas", and remained with her until his death.

Greenberg had three children, all from his first marriage: sons Glenn and Stephen, and daughter Alva. Stephen played baseball at Yale University and spent five years in the Washington Senators/Texas Rangers organization; he later became a baseball executive and sports agent. Alva became a newspaper editor for the Old Lyme Gazette in Old Lyme, Connecticut.

Later in life, Greenberg became an avid tennis player and often took part in amateur tournaments.

Greenberg died after a 13-month battle with metastatic kidney cancer at his home Beverly Hills, California, on September 4, 1986. His remains were entombed at Hillside Memorial Park Cemetery, in Culver City, California.

== Honors ==
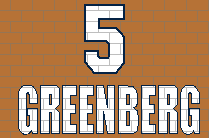
Hank Greenberg's number 5 was retired by the Detroit Tigers in 1983.

In addition to being named AL MVP in 1935 and 1940, Greenberg was also named The Sporting News Most Valuable Player in both years.

Greenberg was elected to the National Baseball Hall of Fame in 1956 on his ninth ballot, garnering 85% of the votes. He became the first Jewish player inducted into the Hall of Fame.

Greenberg was subsequently inducted into the Michigan Sports Hall of Fame in 1958, the International Jewish Sports Hall of Fame in 1979, and the National Jewish Sports Hall of Fame in 1995.

On June 12, 1983, the Detroit Tigers retired Greenberg's number 5 during "Greenberg-Gehringer Day" at Tiger Stadium, along with former teammate Charlie Gehringer's number 2. Both Greenberg and Gehringer attended the ceremony. In 1999, he was ranked No. 37 by The Sporting News on its list of "Baseball's 100 Greatest Players", and was a nominee for the Major League Baseball All-Century Team the same year. In 2020, Greenberg was ranked by The Athletic at No. 67 on its "Baseball 100" list, complied by sportswriter Joe Posnanski.

In 2013, the Bob Feller Act of Valor Award honored Greenberg as one of 37 Baseball Hall of Fame members for his service in the United States Army Air Force during World War II.

In 2006, Greenberg was featured on a United States postage stamp. The stamp is one of a block of four honoring "baseball sluggers", the others being Mickey Mantle, Mel Ott, and Roy Campanella.

In 1998, Greenberg was the subject of a documentary which was directed and written by Aviva Kempner entitled The Life and Times of Hank Greenberg. In 2010, he was again one of the main subjects of the film Jews and Baseball: An American Love Story, alongside Hall of Famer Sandy Koufax of the Los Angeles Dodgers. The film was directed by Peter Miller and written by Ira Berkow.

In May 2024, the U.S. House of Representatives passed a house resolution which recognized the contributions of Jewish Americans in wake of rising antisemitism in the country. Greenberg, along with Koufax, were one of a handful of people who was singled out in the resolution by name.

== See also ==
- Major League Baseball titles leaders
- List of Jewish Major League Baseball players
- List of Major League Baseball home run records
- List of Major League Baseball doubles records
- List of Major League Baseball career batting average leaders
- List of Major League Baseball career home run leaders
- List of Major League Baseball career runs scored leaders
- List of Major League Baseball career runs batted in leaders
- List of Major League Baseball career on-base percentage leaders
- List of Major League Baseball career slugging percentage leaders
- List of Major League Baseball annual home run leaders
- List of Major League Baseball annual runs scored leaders
- List of Major League Baseball annual runs batted in leaders
- List of Major League Baseball annual doubles leaders
