= Bruce A. Sullenger =

American academic, physician

Bruce Alan Sullenger is the Joseph W. and Dorothy W. Beard Professor of Experimental Surgery at the Duke University School of Medicine, the Founding Director of the Duke Translational Research Institute (DTRI) which he led from 2006-2016, and the Associate Director for Translation in the Duke Cancer Institute (DCI).

== Education and previous appointments ==
Sullenger obtained his Bachelor of Science in Biology from Indiana University Bloomington in 1986 and his Ph.D. in Molecular Biology from Weill Cornell Graduate School of Medical Sciences and Memorial Sloan-Kettering Cancer Center in 1991. He performed postdoctoral studies in Thomas Cech’s laboratory in the Department of Biochemistry at the University of Colorado. Since coming to Duke University in 1994, he has held positions in the Departments of Surgery, Molecular Genetics and Microbiology, and Pharmacology and Cancer Biology.

== Scientific contributions ==
Sullenger runs the Duke Cardiovascular Biology Laboratory and serves as the scientific director of the affiliated Duke Translational Medicine Institute (DTMI) Translational Research Center for Thrombotic and Hemostatic Disorders. His research interest is the development of RNA-based therapeutic agents, for potential use as treatments for a range of diseases from cardiovascular and inflammatory diseases to cancer and stroke. His research program explores the translation of the molecular therapeutics invented in his laboratory into the clinical setting.

== Professional memberships and awards ==
Sullenger is Co-Editor-in-Chief of Nucleic Acid Therapeutics, the official journal of the Oligonucleotide Therapeutics Society, and serves on the editorial board of Molecular Therapy, the official journal of the American Society of Gene and Cell Therapy. He is a member of the board of directors of the American Society of Gene and Cell Therapy (2013-2016) and of the Oligonucleotide Therapeutics Society, (2007-2014). He has also received several awards:

- 2000: Azure De Ellis Research Award for Sickle Cell Research
- 2014: Elected Fellow of the American Association for the Advancement of Science (AAAS)
- 2015: Recipient of the Outstanding Achievement Award by the American Society of Gene & Cell Therapy (ASGCT)
- 2017: Recipient of the Weill Cornell Graduate School of Medical Sciences Distinguished Alumnus Award
