= Sophie Gimbel =

American fashion designer (1898–1981)

- Sophie Gimbel in 1937
- Born: 1898; Houston, Texas
- Died: November 28, 1981 (aged 82–83); New York, New York
- Spouse(s): Jay Harry Rossbach (divorced); Adam Gimbel
- Children: Jay Harry Rossbach Jr.
- Parent(s): Caroline Kiam Haas; Felix Haas
- Family: John Alexander McLeay (step-father)

Sophie Gimbel (1898 – November 28, 1981) was an American fashion designer for Salon Moderne of Saks Fifth Avenue. She was a leading designer for nearly 40 years and an innovator of the "New Look" that gained popularity after World War II.

== Early life ==
Born in Houston, Texas, Sophie was the daughter of Caroline (née Kiam) and Felix Haas. Her father was a tobacco merchant who died when she was four and her mother remarried a year later to John Alexander McLeay, whence the family moved to Atlanta, Georgia. As a young girl, Sophie cut her designing teeth making clothing for her dolls. She attended Agnes Scott College for a time before marrying at age 19 to Jay Harry Rossbach and moving to Philadelphia. They had one son, Jay Harry Rossbach Jr. While she was raising her son, she was employed as a part-time stage costume designer. The couple divorced after nine years in 1926.

== Fashion career ==
Sophie was hired as a stylist for Saks by Adam Long Gimbel, grandson of Adam Gimbel, the founder of department store chain Gimbels. In 1929, she was asked to take over the Salon Moderne of the Saks Fifth Avenue flagship store. In her role as lead fashion designer, she often traveled to Paris to purchase clothes from designers. She married Gimbel in 1931.

Salon Moderne was not particularly successful or prestigious prior to her arrival. Gimbel designed costumes for Broadway shows to generate interest and bring in new business. She created many ready-to-wear fashions and is credited with introducing culottes (divided skirts) to the American market. Gowns designed by Gimbel were known for their simplicity, elegance, and use of expensive fabrics. She designed elegant haute couture dresses and gowns for an exclusive clientele. Gimbel designed a red coat and dress for Lady Bird Johnson to wear at Lyndon B. Johnson's 1965 inauguration.

Gimbel was a contemporary and competitor of Hattie Carnegie, whose boutique was close to Saks Fifth Avenue. Gimbel took a conservative approach to fashion, decrying vanishing hem lines and exposed flesh. In a newspaper guest column, she wrote "I believe there should be a law against short shorts. " Though she wasn't a trendsetter, her designs had a widespread appeal for their use of simple lines and subdued elegance.

Gimbel was featured on the cover of Time magazine on September 29, 1947. She was not the first fashion designer to appear there, having been preceded by Elsa Schiaparelli in 1934, but she was the first American designer to grace the cover. The Couture Group of the New York Dress Institute named Gimbel among the best-dressed fashion personalities of 1959.

== Personal life ==
Gimbel died of a heart attack at Mount Sinai Hospital at the age of 83 on November 28, 1981. Her son, Jay Harry Rossbach Jr., was an executive at Saks Fifth Avenue for over thirty years. Gimbel enjoyed playing golf and skiing. She collected china dogs and raised rhododendrons and tulips. Along with her husband, she is the namesake of the Adam and Sophie Gimbel Art and Design Library in New York.
