= Peter Gimbel =

American filmmaker and underwater photojournalist (1927–1987)

- Born: Peter R. Gimbel; February 14, 1927; New York City, US
- Died: July 12, 1987 (aged 60)
- Education: Yale University
- Occupations: Filmmaker and Underwater photojournalist
- Spouses: Mary Bailey; Virginia Taylor; Elga Andersen (until death)
- Children: 2
- Parent: Bernard Gimbel
- Family: Adam Gimbel (great-grandfather)

Peter R. Gimbel (February 14, 1927 – July 12, 1987) was an American filmmaker and underwater photojournalist.

== Biography ==
Born in New York City, he was the son of Alva (née Bernheimer) and Bernard Feustman Gimbel and heir to the Gimbels department store chain. His great grandfather was Adam Gimbel. He had two sisters, Hope Gimbel Solinger and Caral Gimbel Lebworth; and one brother, David Alva Gimbel. After serving in the United States Army occupation force in Japan in 1946–1947, he graduated from Yale University in 1951, earning degrees in both English and economics. He spent ten years as an investment banker but after the death of his twin brother at age 29, he left banking to pursue a career in exploration. He parachuted into the Peruvian Andes with G. Brooks Baekeland (grandson of Leo Baekeland, the inventor of Bakelite) and Peter Lake in search of the lost Inca city of Vilcabamba.

He was the first to dive the wreck of SS Andrea Doria and his photos of the ship were published in Life magazine in August 1956. He produced two documentaries about the ship The Mystery of the Andrea Doria and Andrea Doria: The Final Chapter. He opened the safe of the Andrea Doria on live television in August 1984 at the New York Aquarium.

Gimbel also directed and produced the 1971 film Blue Water, White Death which was the first cinematic filming of great white shark, featuring Ron Taylor and Valerie Taylor, Rodney Fox, Stan Waterman and Peter Lake. The shark's attack on Lake's cage at the end of the film inspired Peter Benchley's book, Jaws.

== Personal life ==
Gimbel married three times. His first wife was socialite Mary Bailey with whom he had two children, Peter Bailey Gimbel and Leslie Gimbel Goldman (Bailey remarried to director Sidney Lumet). His second wife was model Virginia Taylor. In 1978, he married actress Elga Andersen.

== Death ==
Peter Gimbel succumbed to cancer on July 12, 1987, at the age of 60.
