= Lynn Stern =

American photographer

- Born: Lynn Gimbel Solinger; 1945 (age 80–81); New York City
- Education: B.A. Smith College
- Spouses: Robert A. M. Stern (divorced); Jeremy Lang
- Father: David Solinger
- Family: Bernard Gimbel (grandfather)

Lynn Stern (born 1942) is an American photographer, known for her black and white photographs produced using natural light. Stern began to pursue photography as a career in the late 1970s. She lives and works in New York City. Stern's work is held in the collections of the Museum of Fine Arts Houston and the Center for Creative Photography.

== Life ==
Born Lynn Gimbel Solinger in New York City, Stern is the daughter of Hope Alva Gimbel and David Solinger. Her mother was the daughter of Bernard Gimbel and her father was an attorney and the president of the Whitney Museum of American Art. She graduated with honors from Smith College, where she majored in English and minored in music. Hoping to become a film editor, she apprenticed briefly at Ross-Gaffney Films, then married architect Robert A. M. Stern and worked as his photographic archivist. She became interested in photographic composition while assisting his in-house photographer, Edmund Stoecklein.

In 1977, Stern studied at the International Center of Photography (ICP) in New York City, but soon found herself at odds with a curriculum that was oriented toward photojournalism. She left to study privately with Joseph Saltzer, then printed with Paul Caponigro from 1981 to 1982. Her early influences included Caponigro, Edward Weston, and the 19th century American Luminist painters. Later influences include the writings and black paintings of Ad Reinhardt, and the work of Francis Bacon.

== Work ==
The central concern in Stern’s work is luminosity. In 1985, she began using a naturally backlit translucent white fabric to convey the essence of light. Unveilings (1985) features flowers juxtaposed with the folds of a glowing white fabric. Whiteness (1987) focuses solely on the purity of light. Dispossession (1990–’92) is a series of 12 composite works in which human skulls are set against a luminous white fabric, in counterpoint with Stern's face portrayed as a death mask beneath them. The theme of Dispossession is not actual death, but the mind's preoccupation with it – the human struggle to cope with mortality. The Animus (1995–‘97) series, featuring animal skulls, evolved from Dispossession. Creating split-toned negative prints, Stern transformed the luminous white fabric into a rich dark color, causing the animal skulls behind it to come alive in white. In Veiled Still Lifes (1994–2003), Stern photographed vases behind a translucent black fabric, creating a dark, textured luminosity. In all of her series, the space between objects becomes as important as the objects themselves. Later series – (W)Holes, (1994–2006), Ghost Circles (2004–’07) and Full Circle (2001–’09) – furthered her work with skulls and moved increasingly toward abstraction. Five books of Stern's work have been published: Unveilings (1988), Dispossession (1995), Animus (2000), Veiled Still Lifes (2006) and Frozen Mystery (2010), which accompanied her retrospective exhibition at the Museo Fundación Cristóbal Gabarrón in Spain.

== Personal life ==
Stern has been married twice. She divorced architect Robert A. M. Stern in 1977; they had one son, Nicholas S. G. Stern. In 1980, she married architect Jeremy Lang.

== Publications ==
- Disposession. New York City: Aperture Foundation, 1995. With an essay by Donald Kuspit.
- Unveilings. New York City: Hudson Hills Press, 1988. With a foreword by Paul Caponigro.
- Animus. Tucson, AZ: Nazraeli Press, 2000. With an essay by Donald Kuspit.
- Veiled Still Lifes. New York City: QCC Art Gallery Press. 2006. With an introduction by Nancy E Green.
- Frozen Mystery. Tucson, AZ: Center for Creative Photography and Fundación Cristóbal Gabarrón, 2010. With essays by Donald Kuspit, Britt Salvesen, Stern, and George Stolz.

== Awards ==
- Ernst Haas Photography "Book of the Year" Award for Dispossession, 1995
- Black & White Magazine: Excellence Award, 2007

== Collections ==
Stern's work is held in the following permanent collections:

- Museum of Fine Arts Houston
- Center for Creative Photography, University of Arizona, Tucson
