= David Solinger =

American lawyer

- Born: David M. Solinger; February 17, 1906; New York City
- Died: October 29, 1996 (aged 90); Manhattan
- Education: B.A. Cornell University; J.D. Columbia Law School
- Spouse(s): Hope Alva Gimbel (divorced); Betty Ann Besch
- Children: Faith Solinger Sommerfield; Lynn Solinger Stern Lang
- Family: Bernard Gimbel (father-in-law)

David M. Solinger (February 17, 1906 – October 29, 1996) was a lawyer, art collector, and president of the Whitney Museum of American Art.

== Biography ==
Solinger was born in New York City in 1906, the son of Maurice Solinger, a meatpacking business executive. After graduating from Cornell University and Columbia Law School, he worked as a senior partner at the Manhattan law firm Solinger and Gordon. He was one of the first lawyers to develop a specialty in advertising, radio and television law and his clients included Louise Nevelson, Hans Hoffman, and Franz Kline.

In 1961, he was elected a trustee of the Whitney Museum of American Art and in 1966 he succeeded Flora Whitney Miller as its president, the first that was not a member of the Whitney family. While trustee he was instrumental in moving the museum to a new facility designed by Marcel Breuer; and in 1973, as president, in the opening of its first branch location in lower Manhattan.

== Art collection ==
Solinger collected 20th century art and owned works by Klee, Dubuffet, Giacometti, Leger, Miro, Kline, de Kooning, Soulages and Kandinsky as well as a 1927 Picasso, donating many to local museums.

== Personal life ==
Solinger was married twice. In 1937, he married Hope Alva Gimbel, the daughter of Bernard Gimbel; the couple had two daughters before divorcing in 1978: Faith Solinger Sommerfield and Lynn Solinger Stern Lang. He remarried to Betty Ann Besch. Solinger died at his home in Manhattan on October 29, 1996.
