= Mastbaum =

Mastbaum may refer to:

- Blair Mastbaum (1979- ), American writer
- Etta Wedell Mastbaum (1866–1953), American businesswoman and philanthropist
- Jules Mastbaum (1872-1926), American businessman and philanthropist
