= Ralph J. Roberts =

American businessman (1920–2015)

- Roberts in a 2000 interview
- Born: Ralph Joel Roberts; March 13, 1920; New York City, New York, U.S.
- Died: June 18, 2015 (aged 95); Philadelphia, Pennsylvania, U.S.
- Resting place: West Laurel Hill Cemetery
- Education: University of Pennsylvania (BS)
- Occupation: Businessman
- Known for: Founder of Comcast
- Spouse: Suzanne Fleisher (m. 1942)
- Children: Catherine Roberts; Lisa Roberts; Ralph Roberts Jr.; Brian L. Roberts; Douglas Roberts (deceased)
- Military career
- Allegiance: United States
- Branch: United States Navy

Ralph Joel Roberts (March 13, 1920 – June 18, 2015) was an American businessman who was the founder of Comcast, serving as its CEO for 46 years and as its chairman emeritus until his death in 2015.

== Early life and education ==
Roberts was born on March 13, 1920, in New York City. His parents Robert Max Roberts (also known as Bob Roberts) and Sara Wahl were both Russian-Jewish immigrants who became wealthy in the United States through ownership of a number of pharmacies, the most notable of which was in the Biltmore Hotel.

When Roberts was five the family moved to New Rochelle, New York, and then after his father died of a heart-attack, to Germantown, Philadelphia when he was seventeen to live with his stepfather Harry Bobrow, of Bobrow Brothers Cigars. Roberts graduated from the Wharton School of the University of Pennsylvania and served a four-year tour on duty in the United States Navy.

== Career ==
After leaving the navy, Roberts held various jobs, first selling golf clubs, then working for the Muzak Company, and later the Pioneer Suspender Company, which he eventually owned. Using the proceeds from Pioneer, he started purchasing local cable television systems (known as community antenna television at the time), which brought TV to people in rural areas, which were then underserved by big broadcasters.

In 1963, he and his partners, Daniel Aaron and Julian A. Brodsky, paid $500,000 for a 12,000-subscriber cable TV operator in Tupelo, Mississippi, called American Cable Systems. They incorporated in 1969 as Comcast Corporation, a name Roberts invented by combining the words communications and broadcasting.

Roberts has been credited with expanding Comcast into the largest cable television company in the United States.

== Accolades ==
Roberts served on the boards of the Philadelphia Orchestra, the Brandywine River Museum, the Greater Philadelphia Urban Affairs Coalition, and the Penn Medicine Board of Trustees. Roberts received awards from the National Cable and Telecommunications Association, the Walter Kaitz Foundation, the Anti-Defamation League of B'nai B'rith, The National Conference of Christians and Jews, the Urban League of Philadelphia, the Greater Philadelphia Chamber of Commerce, the Golden Plate Award of the American Academy of Achievement, and the National Academy of Television Arts & Sciences. He was awarded honorary degrees from both Holy Family College and the University of Pennsylvania, where he received their Joseph P. Wharton Award. In 1998, the Broadcast Pioneers of Philadelphia inducted Roberts into their Hall of Fame. The Suzanne F. and Ralph J. Roberts Foundation was one of the largest contributors to the restoration of the Alfred W. Fleisher Memorial Synagogue at Eastern State Penitentiary in Philadelphia named in the honor of his father-in-law.

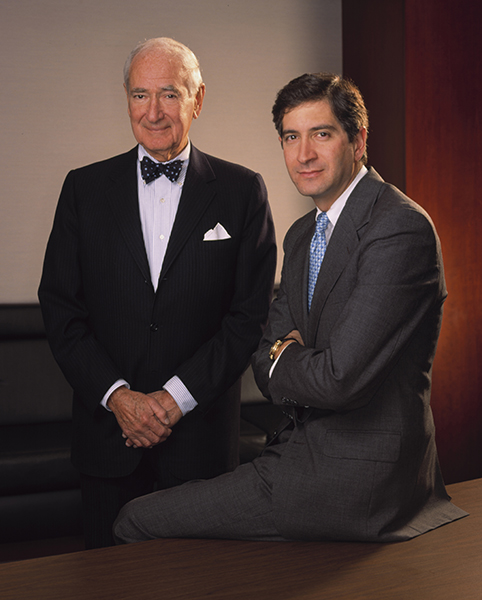
Ralph J. Roberts, founder of Comcast, with his son Brian L. Roberts, at their Philadelphia headquarters in 1999

== Personal life ==
In 1942, Roberts married Suzanne Fleisher, who was also Jewish, an actress and playwright, and daughter of philanthropist Alfred W. Fleisher. Her name appears on the Suzanne Roberts Theatre in Philadelphia and she hosted a TV program aimed at seniors called "Seeking Solutions with Suzanne" on Comcast's CN8 network. They had five children: Catherine, Lisa, Ralph Jr. (Rob), Brian, and Douglas (who died in 2011); and eight grandchildren. Their son, Brian L. Roberts, is the current CEO of Comcast Corporation.

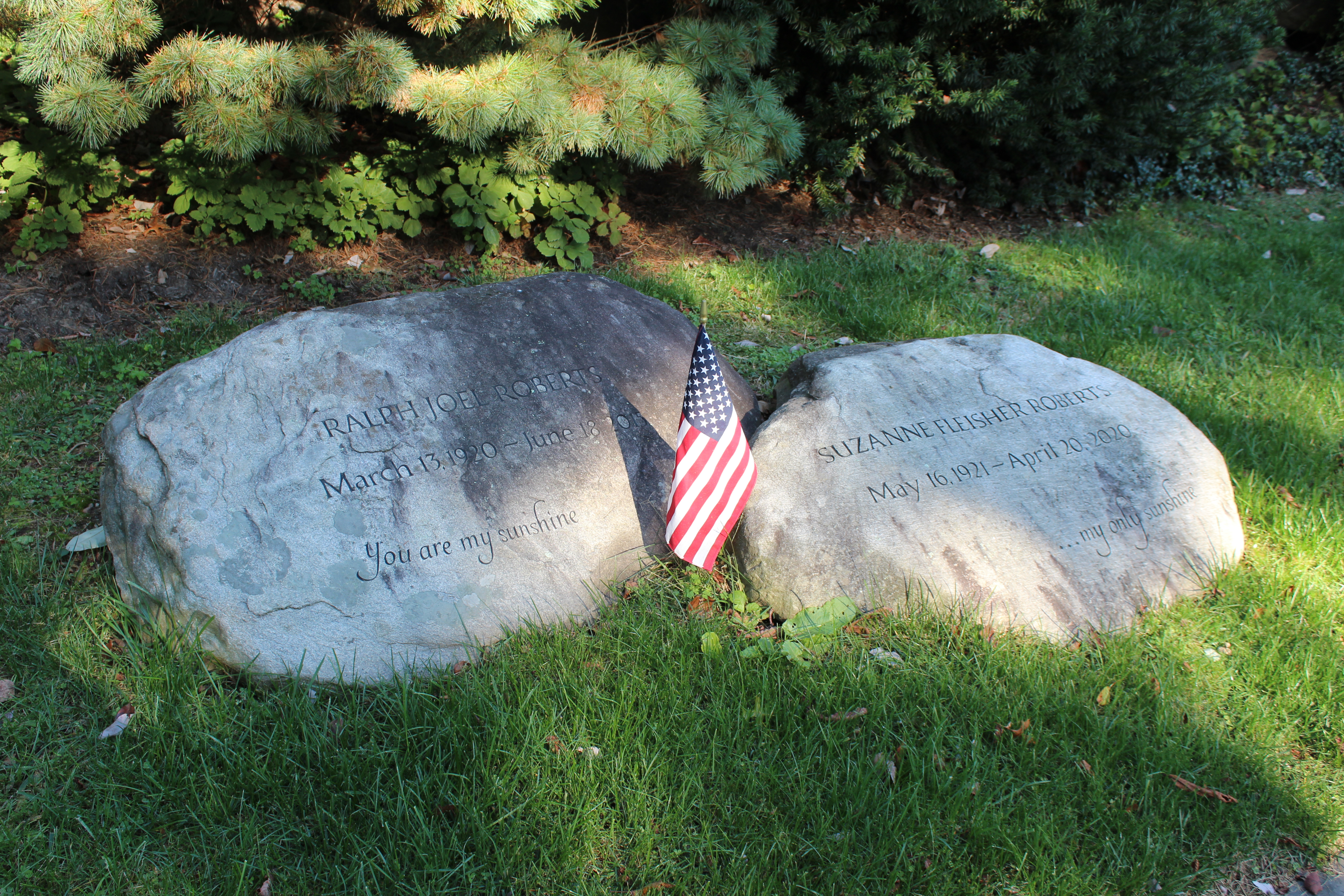
Roberts' grave at West Laurel Hill Cemetery

Roberts made an appearance on TLC's reality series Cake Boss, receiving a cake for his 90th birthday in 2010. He died on June 18, 2015, of natural causes.
