= Suzanne Roberts Theatre =

Theatre in Philadelphia, United States

Coordinates: 39.9450°N 75.1656°W

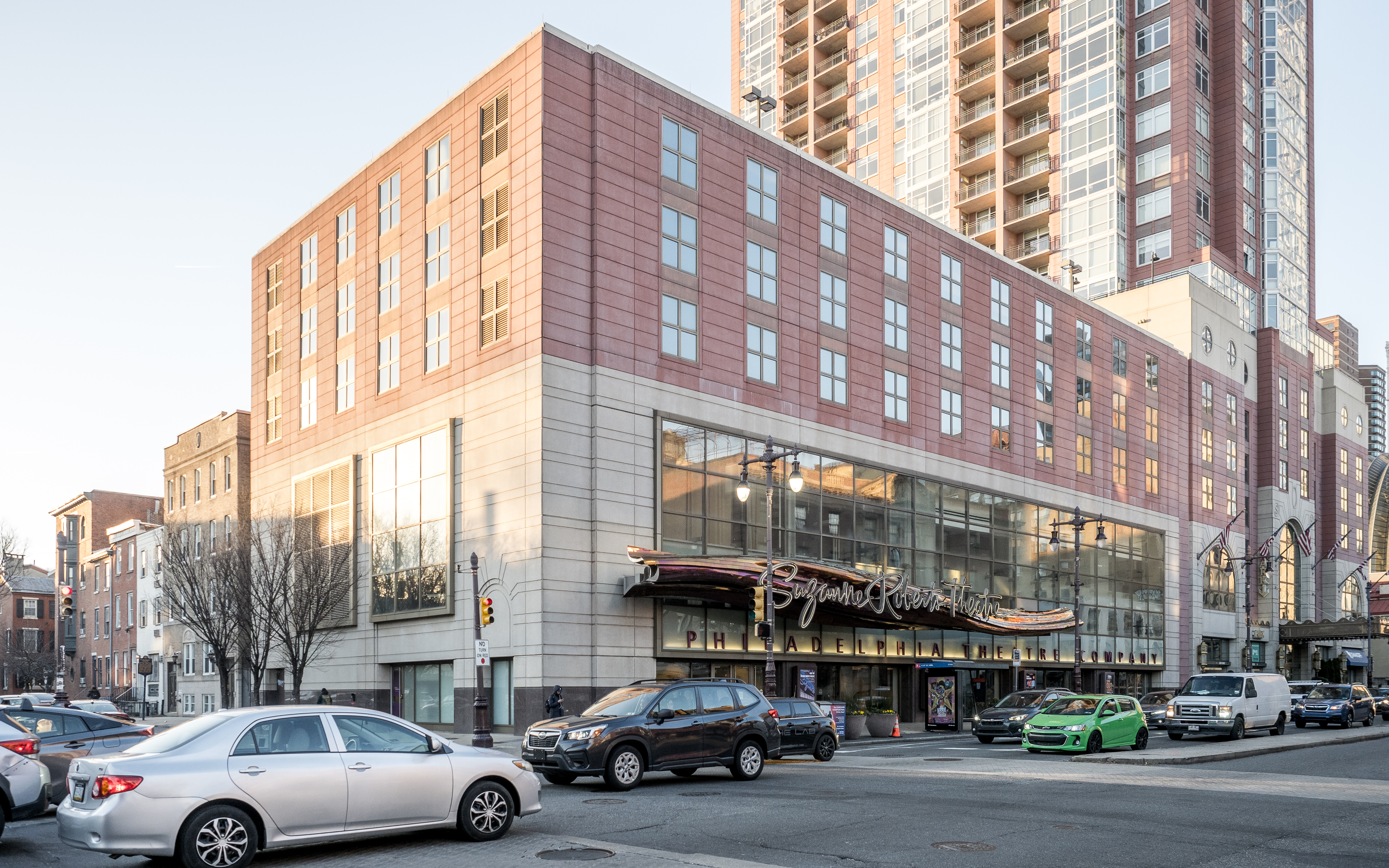
- The Suzanne Roberts Theatre on Broad St. in Philadelphia in 2024
- Interactive map of Suzanne Roberts Theatre
- Address: 480 S. Broad Street; Philadelphia; United States
- Owner: Philadelphia Theatre Company
- Capacity: 365

Construction
- Opened: October 2007
- Years active: 2007–present
- Architect: KieranTimberlake

Website
- Official website

The Suzanne Roberts Theatre is a theater on Philadelphia's Avenue of the Arts. The theater opened in October 2007 and is home to the Philadelphia Theatre Company. The theater was designed by KieranTimberlake, using the principles of universal design. The theater's signage facade was designed by House Industries in Wilmington, Delaware and produced by Zahner in Kansas City, Missouri.

It is named after Suzanne Roberts (born Suzanne Fleisher in 1921, died 2020), a former actress, playwright, and director who was the host of the TV program, Seeking Solutions with Suzanne, which formerly aired on The Comcast Network and HLN. Her husband, Ralph J. Roberts founded Comcast and her son, Brian L. Roberts is Comcast's current CEO.

From 1982 until the opening of its 2007/2008 season in the new venue, the Philadelphia Theatre Company had been a resident performer at the Plays and Players Theatre.

== Features ==
The Suzanne Roberts Theatre features:

- Box office with street access
- 360-seat traditional proscenium auditorium and mezzanine
- Two-story lobby and mezzanine level reception area
- Lighting and sound facilities for productions, workshops, readings, and educational programming
