= Brian L. Roberts =

American businessman (born 1959)

Brian Roberts
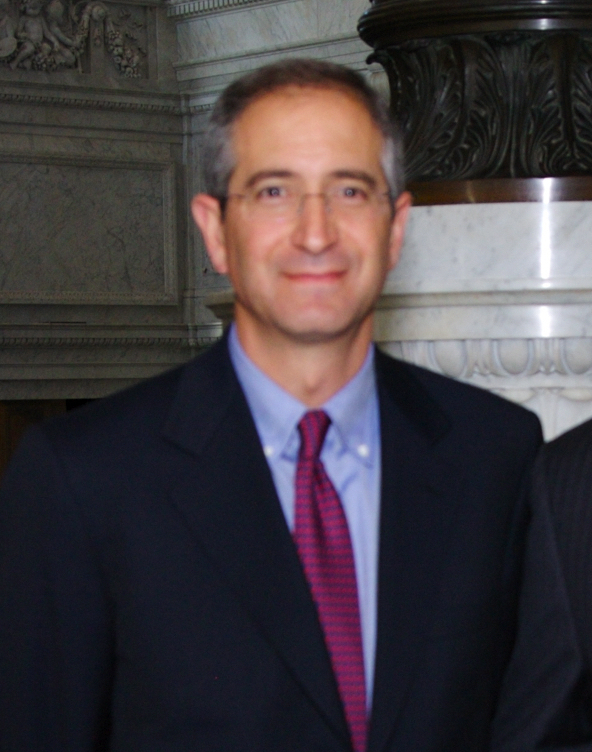
- Born: June 28, 1959 (age 67); Philadelphia, Pennsylvania, U.S.
- Education: University of Pennsylvania (BS)
- Occupations: Businessman; Executive; Philanthropist
- Title: Chairman and CEO, Comcast
- Spouse: Aileen Kennedy Roberts
- Children: 3
- Father: Ralph J. Roberts

Brian L. Roberts (born June 28, 1959) is an American entrepreneur, business executive and billionaire. He is the chairman and CEO of Comcast, a multinational telecommunications and media company providing entertainment and communications products and services, founded by his father, Ralph J. Roberts. He was named president of Comcast in 1990 before becoming the CEO in 2002.

== Early life and education ==
Roberts was born into a Jewish family in Philadelphia, Pennsylvania, the son of Ralph J. Roberts, the founder of Comcast Corporation, and Suzanne (née Fleisher), an actress and playwright. His maternal grandfather, Alfred W. Fleisher, was a real estate investor and philanthropist. Roberts graduated from Germantown Academy and earned a Bachelor of Science degree from the University of Pennsylvania in 1981.

== Career ==
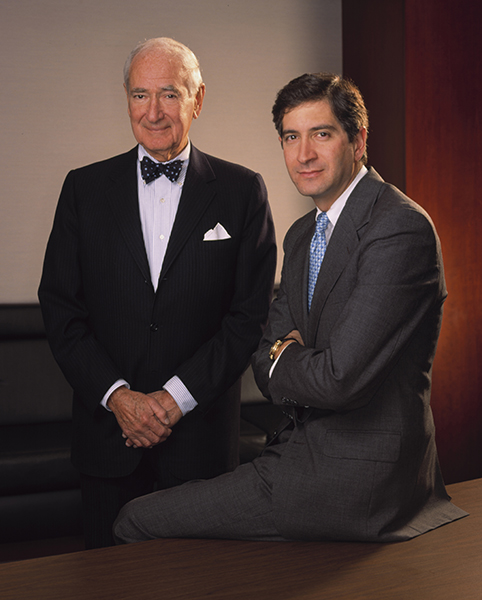
Brian L. Roberts with his father Ralph J. Roberts, co-founder of Comcast, at their Philadelphia headquarters in 1999

=== Comcast ===
Roberts began his career at Comcast after graduating from Wharton in 1981, as a manager of cable system marketing. In 1987, he was promoted to executive vice president.

Roberts assumed the role of President of Comcast in 1990 at the age of 31, when the company's annual revenue was $657 million. The company's annual revenue grew significantly since then, reaching $122 billion by 2024.

In 1997, Roberts coordinated a deal with Bill Gates for Microsoft to invest $1 billion in Comcast, which supported the expansion of its broadband network. As of 2024 the network is the largest Internet service provider in the US.

In 2001, Comcast acquired AT&T Broadband for $72 billion. The deal allowed Comcast to become the largest cable operator in the world. In 2002, Roberts became the company's CEO; he subsequently became chairman of the board in 2004.

In 2011, Comcast acquired NBCUniversal, expanding the company's portfolio in the media space. Through this deal, Roberts was able to integrate Comcast's cable networks with broadcast television and film production.

In 2018, Comcast acquired the British media and telecommunications company, Sky. The acquisition, according to Roberts, gave Comcast an opportunity for international growth.

During Roberts's tenure, the company's customer base expanded from 2.4 million in 1990 to 52 million in 2024.

In 2023, Roberts's total compensation at Comcast was $35.5 million, up 11% from the previous year.

=== NCTA and CableLabs ===
Roberts previously served as chairman of the board of directors of the National Cable & Telecommunications Association (NCTA) from 1995 to 1996, a period during which the landmark deregulatory 1996 Telecommunications Act was enacted. He later returned to serve as chairman for two consecutive terms from 2005 to 2007.

Additionally, Roberts was elected chairman of CableLabs, a research and development consortium for the cable industry, where he held the position for three consecutive terms

== Awards and philanthropy ==
Institutional Investor magazine named Roberts as its top vote-getter for three years in a row (2004–06) in the Cable & Satellite category of their America's Best CEOs annual survey. Additionally, the magazine has included Roberts in its list of America's top CEOs on multiple occasions since 2003.

Roberts was the recipient of the 1994 Golden Plate Award of the American Academy of Achievement, the 2004 Humanitarian Award from the Simon Wiesenthal Center, and was the 2002 Walter Kaitz Foundation Honoree of the Year for his commitment to diversity in the cable industry. The Police Athletic League of Philadelphia honored Roberts with their 2002 award for his commitment to youth programs and community involvement.

In 2011, Roberts was awarded the USC Shoah Foundation Institute's 2011 Ambassador for Humanity Award. In 2021, he was a recipient of the centennial Philadelphia Award. The following year, Roberts received the William Penn award, "the highest honor bestowed upon a business executive in Greater Philadelphia," according to the Chamber of Commerce.

== Community involvement ==
The Roberts family, led by Brian, has made philanthropic contributions to various medical, educational, and cultural institutions. In 2006, they made a donation to help establish The Roberts Proton Therapy Center at Penn Medicine.

In 2016, the family provided a gift to support the creation of the Roberts Collaborative for Genetics and Individualized Medicine at the Children's Hospital of Philadelphia. In response to the COVID-19 pandemic in 2020, the Roberts family donated $5 million to the School District of Philadelphia to purchase Chromebooks for students to support virtual learning. In 2021, they established the Roberts Family Professorship in Vaccine Research at the Perelman School of Medicine, along with the Katalin Karikó Fellowship Fund in Vaccine Development.

In March 2025, Roberts and his family donated $125 million to the Children's Hospital of Philadelphia, which will support the development of a new 20-story building known as Roberts Children's Health.

== Maccabiah Games ==
A squash player, Roberts competed in the Maccabiah Games in Israel, earning a gold medal with the U.S. squash team in the 2005 Maccabiah Games, and silver medals in the 1981 Maccabiah Games, the 1985 Maccabiah Games, the 1997 Maccabiah Games, and the 2009 Maccabiah Games. On October 21, 2012, Roberts was honored by Maccabi USA as a 'Legend of the Maccabiah.'

== Politics ==
Roberts was a founding co-chair of Philadelphia 2000, the nonpartisan host committee for the 2000 Republican National Convention. The Pennsylvania Report named Roberts to the 2003 "The Pennsylvania Report Power 75" list of influential figures in Pennsylvania politics, calling him "Pennsylvania’s most powerful businessman", and noted his influence with Pennsylvania Governor Ed Rendell.

In 2003, Roberts was named to the PoliticsPA list of politically influential individuals.

In December 2009, Roberts wrote a letter to President Barack Obama, endorsing the Patient Protection and Affordable Care Act.

Roberts has donated $90,600 to Democratic candidates/PACs, and $70,300 to Republican candidates/PACs. He has not donated to any political party or candidate since 2012.

== Personal life ==
Roberts and his wife, Aileen Kennedy Roberts, live in Philadelphia and have three children. Aileen is the chair of the Barnes Foundation.

In 2010, Roberts, along with his late brother, Douglas, and his father, presented his mother a Women's Image Network Awards Lifetime Achievement Award.
