= Benjamin M. Golder =

American politician

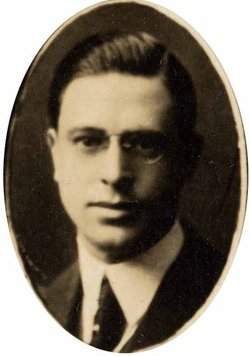

Member of the U.S. House of Representatives from Pennsylvania's 4th district
- In office March 4, 1925 – March 3, 1933
- Preceded by: George W. Edmonds
- Succeeded by: George W. Edmonds

Member of the Pennsylvania House of Representatives
- In office 1916–1924

Personal details
- Born: December 23, 1891 Alliance, New Jersey, U.S.
- Died: December 30, 1946 (aged 55) Philadelphia, Pennsylvania, U.S.
- Party: Republican
- Education: University of Pennsylvania Law School

Military service
- Allegiance: United States
- Battles/wars: World War I

Benjamin Martin Golder (December 23, 1891 – December 30, 1946) was a Republican member of the United States House of Representatives, representing the Commonwealth of Pennsylvania's Fourth District.

== Biography ==
Benjamin Golder was born in Alliance, New Jersey (in Pittsgrove Township, New Jersey). He moved with his parents to Philadelphia in 1893. He graduated from the law department of the University of Pennsylvania at Philadelphia in 1913.

He enlisted in the Naval Aviation Service during World War I and was honorably discharged as ensign after the Armistice. He became a member of the Pennsylvania State House of Representatives, serving from 1916 to 1924.

He was elected in 1924 as a Republican to the 69th Congress, and represented Pennsylvania's Fourth District. He was an unsuccessful candidate for renomination in 1932 and for election in 1940. He resumed the practice of law in Philadelphia until the Second World War. He was commissioned a captain in the United States Army on February 5, 1943, and served until discharged as a lieutenant colonel on July 1, 1945.

In 1930, he married Peggy Mastbaum, daughter of Etta Wedell Mastbaum and Jules E. Mastbaum. Golder was the younger brother of historian Frank A. Golder (1877–1929), an academic expert on the history of Imperial Russia.

He died at his home in Philadelphia on December 30, 1946, following a brief illness, and was buried at that city's Mount Sinai Cemetery.

== See also ==
- List of Jewish members of the United States Congress

U.S. House of Representatives
Preceded by George W. Edmonds	Member of the U.S. House of Representatives from Pennsylvania's 4th congressional district 1925–1933	Succeeded by George W. Edmonds
