= George W. Edmonds =

American politician (1864–1939)

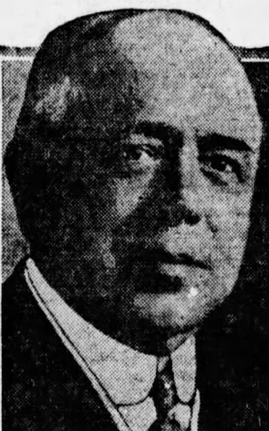

Member of the U.S. House of Representatives from Pennsylvania's 4th district
- In office March 4, 1933 – January 3, 1935
- Preceded by: Benjamin M. Golder
- Succeeded by: J. Burrwood Daly
- In office March 4, 1913 – March 3, 1925
- Preceded by: Reuben Moon
- Succeeded by: Benjamin M. Golder

Personal details
- Born: February 22, 1864 Pottsville, Pennsylvania, U.S.
- Died: September 28, 1939 (aged 75) Philadelphia, Pennsylvania, U.S.
- Resting place: West Laurel Hill Cemetery, Bala Cynwyd, Pennsylvania, U.S.
- Party: Republican

George Washington Edmonds (February 22, 1864 – September 28, 1939) was an American politician who served as a Republican member of the U.S. House of Representatives for Pennsylvania's 4th congressional district from 1913 to 1925 and from 1933 to 1935. He founded the Black Diamond Coal Company and the Warner Shuster Company which became a part of the George W. Newton Coal Company.

== Early life and education ==
George W. Edmonds was born February 22, 1864, in Pottsville, Pennsylvania. He attended Central High School in Philadelphia and graduated from the Philadelphia College of Pharmacy in 1887.

== Career ==
He worked as a pharmacist for several years and was also engaged in the coal business. He served as member of the common council of Philadelphia from 1896 to 1902. He was elected to Congress as a Republican in 1912 and served as the Chairman of the House Committee on Claims.

He was an unsuccessful candidate for renomination in 1924 and entered the wholesale coal and lumber business. He established the Black Diamond Company and the Warner Shuster Company which was sold to the George W. Newton Coal Company and he served as director. Later he was elected manager of the Port of Philadelphia Ocean Traffic Bureau in September 1927 and served until 1933. He was again elected to Congress in 1932 for one term. He then resumed the wholesale coal business in Philadelphia.

He died at Jefferson Hospital on September 28, 1939, and was interred at West Laurel Hill Cemetery in Bala Cynwyd, Pennsylvania.

U.S. House of Representatives
Preceded by Reuben O. Moon	Member of the U.S. House of Representatives from Pennsylvania's 4th congressional district 1913–1925	Succeeded by Benjamin M. Golder
Preceded by Benjamin M. Golder	Member of the U.S. House of Representatives from Pennsylvania's 4th congressional district 1933–1935	Succeeded by J. Burrwood Daly
