= Rodin Museum =

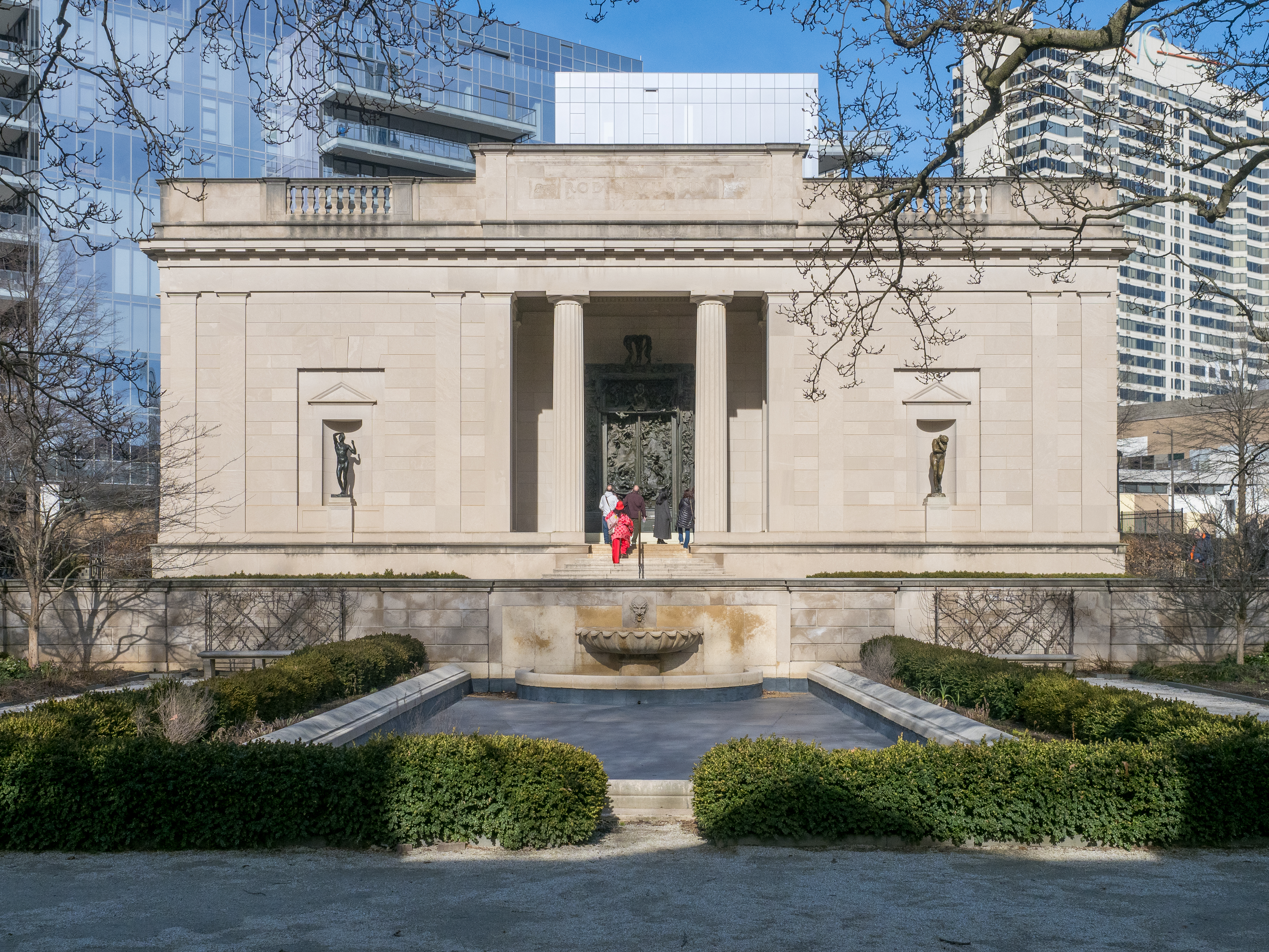
- (2024)
- Established: November 29, 1929
- Location: 2151 Benjamin Franklin Parkway; Philadelphia, Pennsylvania
- Coordinates: 39.962°N 75.174°W
- Type: Art museum
- Collections: Sculpture
- Collection size: 150 objects (bronzes, marbles, and plasters)
- Founder: Jules Mastbaum
- Architects: Paul Cret; Jacques Gréber
- Public transit access: SEPTA bus: 7, 32, 38, 48, 49; Philly PHLASH; Suburban Station
- Website: www.rodinmuseum.org

Philadelphia Register of Historic Places

The Rodin Museum is an art museum located in Philadelphia, Pennsylvania that contains one of the largest collections of sculptor Auguste Rodin's works outside Paris. Opened in 1929, the museum is administered by the Philadelphia Museum of Art. The museum houses a collection of nearly 150 objects containing bronzes, marbles, and plasters by Rodin.

In 2012, the museum re-opened after a three-year, $9 million renovation that brought the museum back to its original vision of displaying Rodin's works.

== History ==
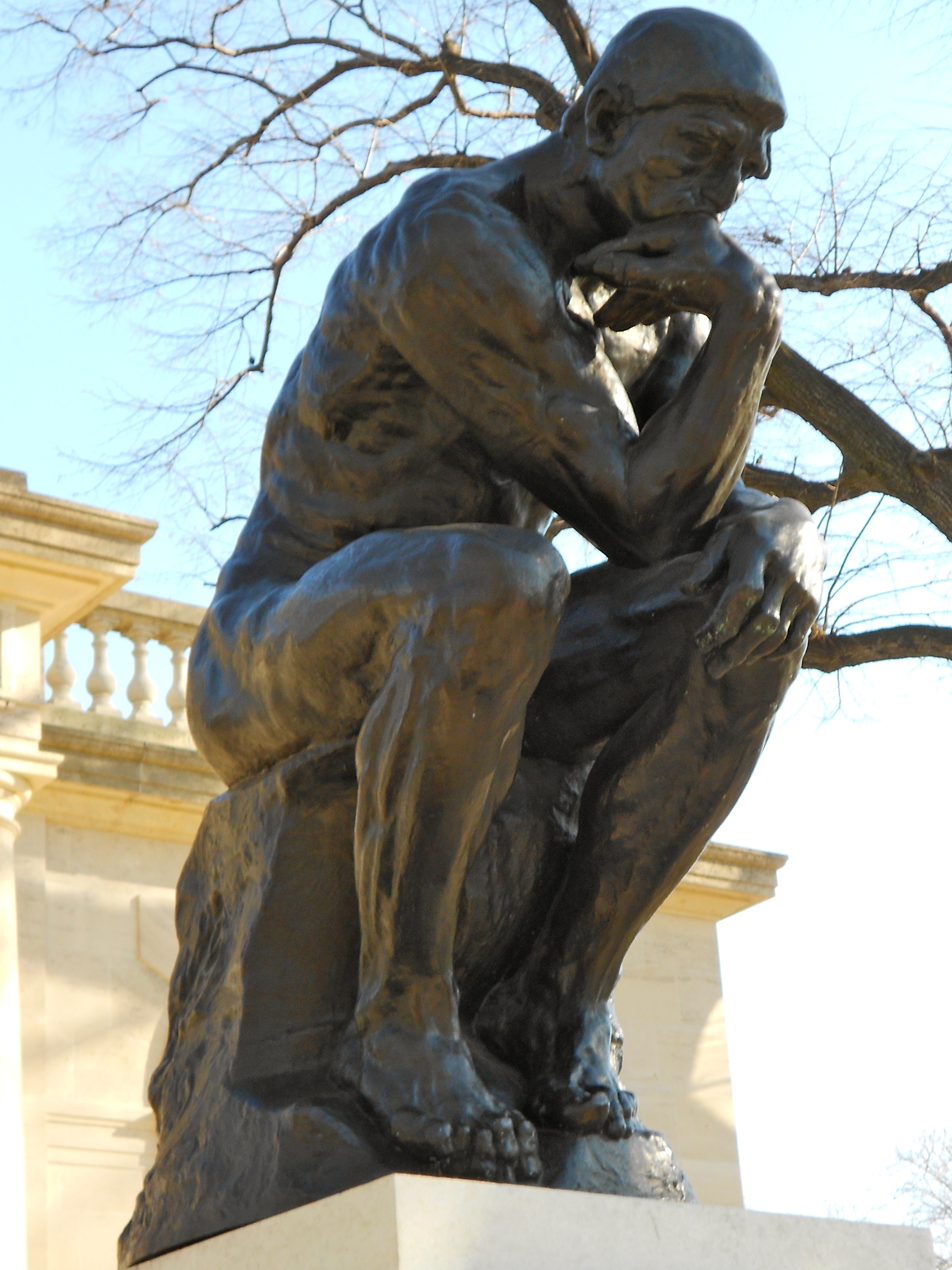
The Thinker, a statue by Auguste Rodin outside the museum

The museum was a gift of movie-theatre magnate Jules Mastbaum (1872–1926) to the city of Philadelphia. Mastbaum began collecting works by Rodin in 1923 with the intent of founding a museum. Within three years, he assembled the largest collection of Rodin's works outside Paris, including bronze castings, plaster studies, drawings, prints, letters, and books.

In 1926, Mastbaum commissioned French architects Paul Cret and Jacques Gréber to design the museum building and gardens. He died before the museum was complete, but his widow, Etta Wedell Mastbaum honored his commitment and the Museum opened on November 29, 1929. Murals in the museum were executed by the painter Franklin C. Watkins.

== Collection ==
The best-known of Rodin's works, The Thinker (1880–1882), sits outside the museum in the entry courtyard. Visitors once entered through a cast of The Gates of Hell, located at the main entrance to the museum, which is no longer used. This massive 5.5-m-tall bronze doorway was originally created for the Museum of Decorative Arts (which was to have been located in Paris but never came into existence). Rodin sculpted more than 100 figures for these doors from 1880 until his death in 1917. This casting is one of the three originals; several others have been made since. Several of his most famous works, including The Thinker, are actually studies for these doors which were later expanded into separate works.

The museum's several rooms house many more of the artist's works, including The Kiss (1886), Eternal Springtime (1884), The Age of Bronze (1875–76), and The Burghers of Calais, a monument commissioned by the City of Calais in 1884.

In 2019, the Rodin museum mounted a two-year special exhibition titled Rethinking the Modern Monument, curated by Alexander Kauffman, which paired 16 works from the Philadelphia Museum of Art with selected Rodin sculptures. The special exhibition featured bronze sculptures by Jean Arp, Barbara Hepworth, Jacques Lipchitz, Marino Marini, Chana Orloff, and Alberto Giacometti, among others.

== Image gallery ==
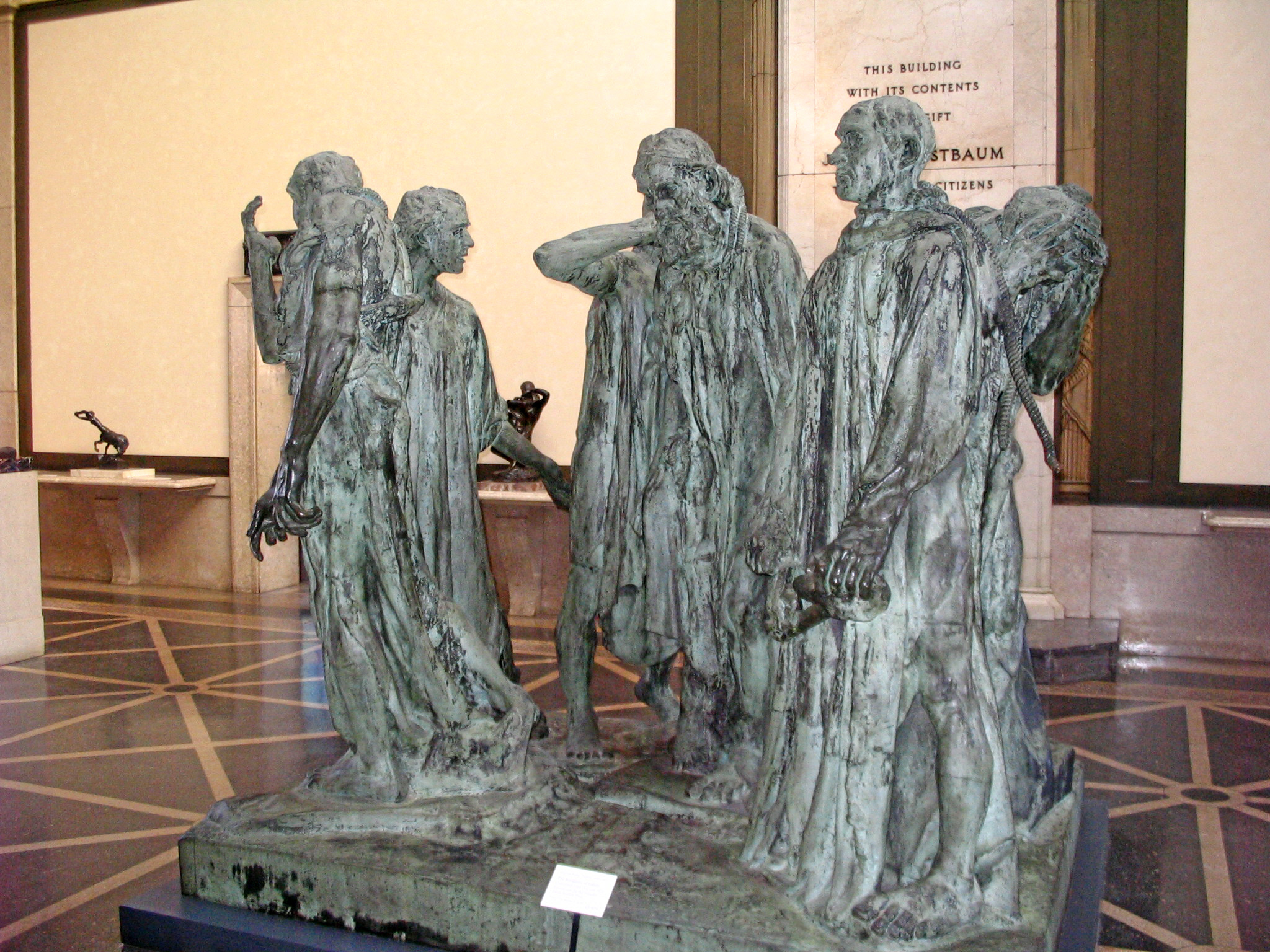
Burghers of Calais

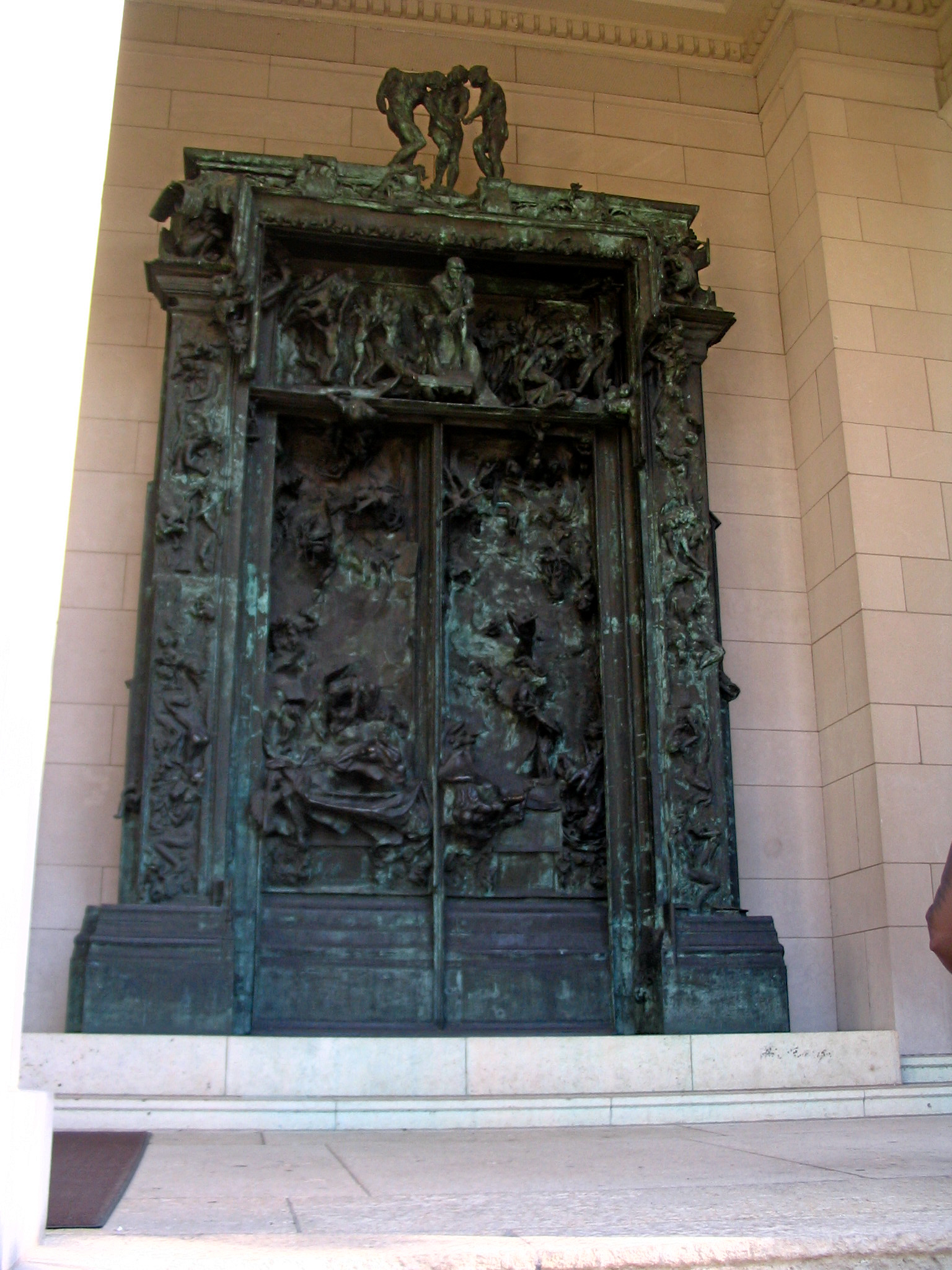
The Gates of Hell

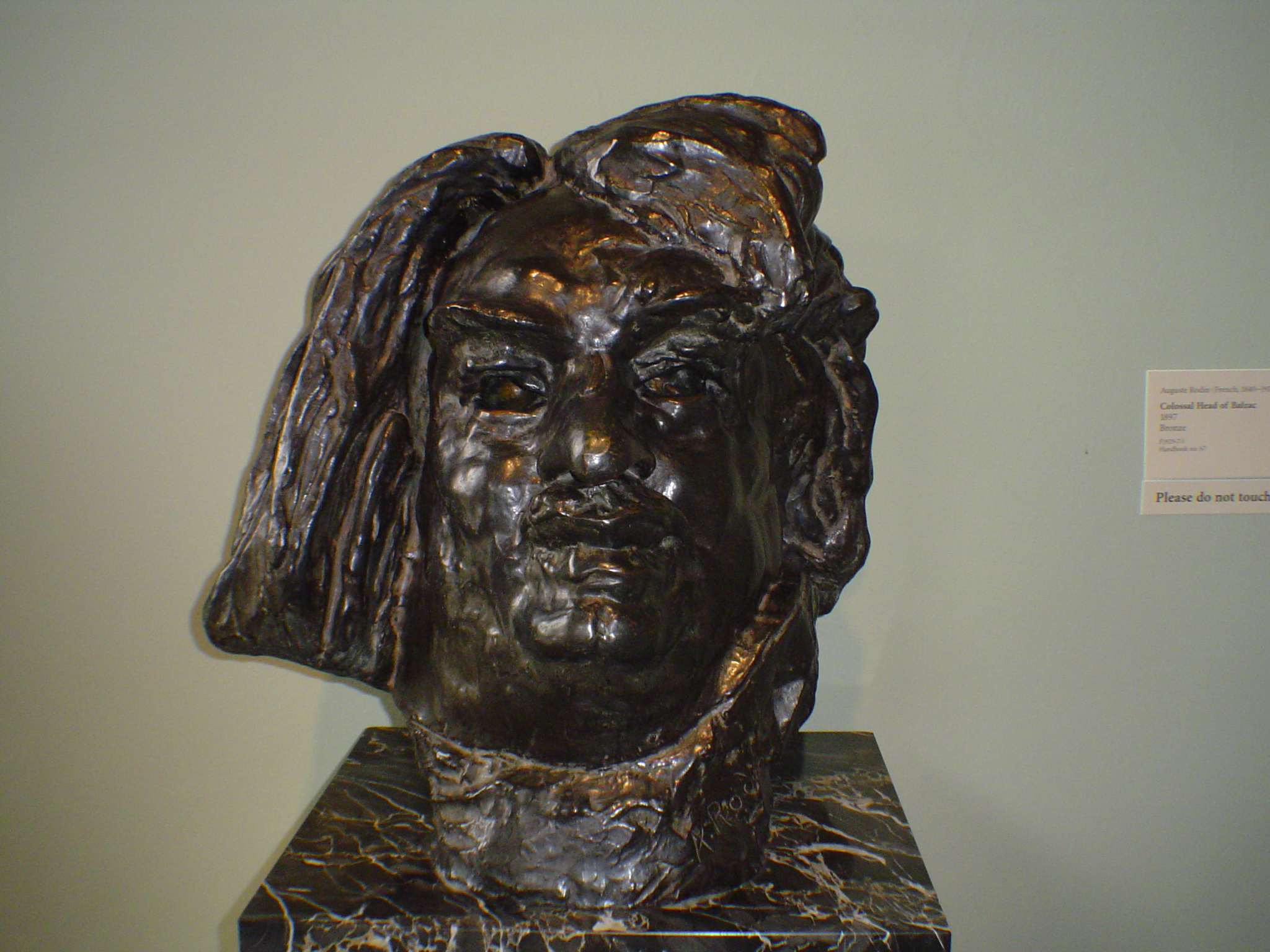
The Colossal Head of Balzac

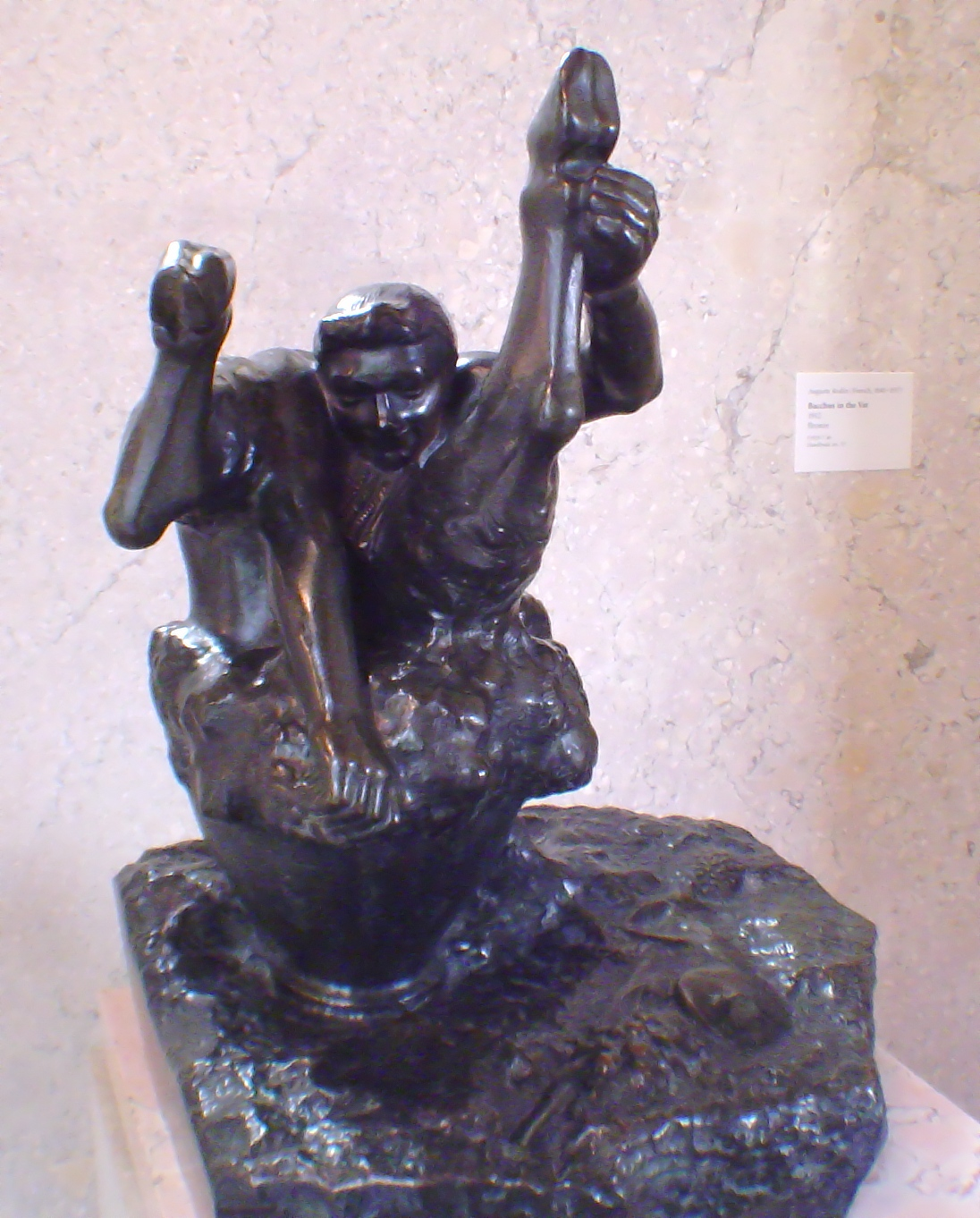
Bacchus in the Vat

== See also ==
- Benjamin Franklin Parkway
- List of single-artist museums
