= Richard Gimbel =

American businessman (1898–1970)

- Born: Richard Gimbel; July 26, 1898; Atlantic City, New Jersey, US
- Died: May 27, 1970 (age 71); Munich, Germany
- Education: B.A. Yale University
- Spouse: Julia de Fernex Millhiser
- Children: 7 including Roger Gimbel
- Family: Adam Gimbel (grandfather); Jules Mastbaum (uncle); Etta Wedell Mastbaum (aunt)

Richard Gimbel (July 26, 1898 – May 27, 1970) was an American businessman, World War I and World War II veteran, and book collector who served as president of curator of aeronautical literature at the Yale University Library.

== Biography ==
Gimbel was born July 26, 1898, in Atlantic City, the son of Ellis A. Gimbel and Minnie (née Mastbaum). His father was chairman of the board at the Gimbel Brothers Company which his grandfather, Adam Gimbel, founded in Vincennes, Indiana in 1842. His mother was the sister of theatre owner Jules Mastbaum who was married to Etta Wedell Mastbaum. Gimbel studied in Europe and graduated with a B.A. from Yale University with honors in 1920. He served with the 310th Field Artillery Regiment during World War I rising from private to first lieutenant. After taking a year off to travel the world, Gimbel worked for his family's business overseeing the construction of their Philadelphia store in 1927 and then as a vice president of Gimbel Brothers Company. In 1935, he left Gimbel Brothers after a dispute with his cousin Bernard Gimbel over strategy and moved to Miami where he profitably ran a Richards store. In 1940, he joined the Army Air Corp as a lieutenant colonel and with the Eighth Air Force as a pilot during World War II. In 1951, he was appointed Professor of Air Science and Tactics at Yale University. In 1953, he retired as full colonel in 1953 and stayed with the library as curator of aeronautical literature. He was also a fellow of Pierson College.

== Book collection ==
In 1942, during the London blitz, he visited a bombed‐out bookstore in London and purchased a trunk of aeronautical books. Thereafter, he was a voracious collector of books, specializing in Charles Dickens, Edgar Allan Poe, and Thomas Paine in addition to anything aeronautical. He purchased the Philadelphia home of Edgar Allan Poe, filled it with his non-aeronautical collection, and presented it to the city of Philadelphia as the Edgar Allan Poe House and Museum. Upon his death, he had over 100,000 items in his aeronautical collection.

== Personal life ==
Gimbel was married to Julia de Fernex Millhiser. They had two sons, Roger Gimbel and Dan Gimbel; and five daughters, Sally Gimbel Taussig, Ann Gimbel Goff, Joyce Gimbel Trifield, Patricia Gimbel Lewis, and Pamela Gimbel Lehman. On May 27, 1970, Gimbel died of a heart attack in Munich, Germany.
