= Chafie Fields =

American football player (born 1977)

Profile
- Position: Wide receiver

Personal information
- Born: February 4, 1977 (age 49); Philadelphia, Pennsylvania, U.S.
- Listed height: 6 ft 1 in (1.85 m)
- Listed weight: 200 lb (91 kg)

Career information
- College: Penn State

Career history
- 2000: San Francisco 49ers
- 2000–2001: Denver Broncos
- 2002: New York Jets

Awards and highlights
- Second-team All-Big Ten (1999)

Chafie Ali Fields (born February 4, 1977) is an American sports and talent agent. He played professional football as a wide receiver in the National Football League (NFL). He played college football for the Penn State Nittany Lions.

Fields partnered with Joel Segal, the longtime head of Worldwide Entertainment & Sports, in 2005. Their firm, Fields Consulting, based in Miami, Florida, represents various athletes and entertainers, most notably Arizona Cardinals 2007 first-round draft pick Levi Brown, Detroit Lions wide receiver Bryant Johnson, Buffalo Bills 2009 first-round pick Aaron Maybin, and Oakland Raiders 2015 first-round selection wide receiver Amari Cooper.

Although Fields resides in Miami, he is a partner in a Philadelphia restaurant, Halal Bilah.

== Football career ==
Fields was a dual-threat wide receiver for Penn State from 1996 to 1999 with 88 catches for 1,437 yards. He is known for his 84-yard double reverse in Penn State's 38-15 win over Texas in the 1997 Fiesta Bowl. Fields went undrafted in the 2000 NFL draft due to concerns about a nagging ankle injury. He spent a season each with the San Francisco 49ers, the Denver Broncos, and the New York Jets who released him prior to the 2002 regular season. He never played in a regular season or postseason NFL game.

Fields earned his Bachelor of Science in Human Development and Family Studies from Penn State in 1999. He attended Mastbaum Area Vocational/Technical School, in Philadelphia, where he was named All-America by SuperPrep magazine, Blue Chip Illustrated and USA Today.
