= James Brown (offensive tackle) =

American football player (born 1970)

No. 76, 74
- Position: Offensive tackle

Personal information
- Born: January 3, 1970 (age 56); Philadelphia, Pennsylvania, U.S.
- Listed height: 6 ft 6 in (1.98 m)
- Listed weight: 325 lb (147 kg)

Career information
- High school: Mastbaum (Philadelphia)
- College: Virginia State
- NFL draft: 1992: 3rd round, 82nd overall pick

Career history
- Dallas Cowboys (1992)*; Indianapolis Colts (1992)*; New York Jets (1992–1995); Miami Dolphins (1996–1999); Cleveland Browns (2000)
- * Offseason or practice squad member only

Awards and highlights
- Division II All-American (1991); 2× All-CIAA (1990, 1991)

Career NFL statistics
- Games played: 114
- Games started: 86
- Fumble recoveries: 1
- Stats at Pro Football Reference

James Lamont Brown (born January 3, 1970) is an American former professional football player who was an offensive tackle in the National Football League (NFL) for the New York Jets, Miami Dolphins, and Cleveland Browns. He was selected by the Dallas Cowboys in the third round of the 1992 NFL draft. He played college football at Virginia State University.

== Early life ==
Brown attended Jules E. Mastbaum Area Vocational Technical School, where he played as a two-way tackle. He also practiced the shot put.

He accepted a football scholarship from Virginia State University. As a redshirt freshman, he was named the starter at tight end. He would become a three-year starter at left tackle and did not surrender a sack as a senior.

== Professional career ==
=== Dallas Cowboys ===
Brown was selected by the Dallas Cowboys in the third round (82nd overall) of the 1992 NFL draft, after a great showing at the NFL Scouting Combine. He was released from the team before the season started.

=== New York Jets ===
On September 2, 1992, he was signed to the New York Jets' practice squad. In 1993, he made the regular roster and played in 14 games (one start). In 1994, he started 6 out of 16 games and in 1995 he started 12 of 14 games at right tackle. In three years with the Jets he started 19 of 44 games. On March 4, 1996, he was traded to the Miami Dolphins in exchange for a fifth round draft choice (#145-Raymond Austin).

=== Miami Dolphins ===
Brown reunited with his former head coach Jimmy Johnson, during the 1996 offseason. He started all 16 games at right tackle for the Dolphins from 1996 to 1998. On March 2, 1998, he was signed to a five-year $10.5 million contract with a $3.1 million signing bonus. In 1999, he started 14 of 15 games, missing one due to a sprained left ankle. On June 15, 2000, the Dolphins released him only two years into the five-year contract.

=== Cleveland Browns ===
On July 13, 2000, Brown signed as a free agent with the Cleveland Browns, starting 5 out of 7 games at right tackle. He was not re-signed after the season.
