= The Age of Bronze =

Sculpture by Auguste Rodin

- L'âge d'airain (French)
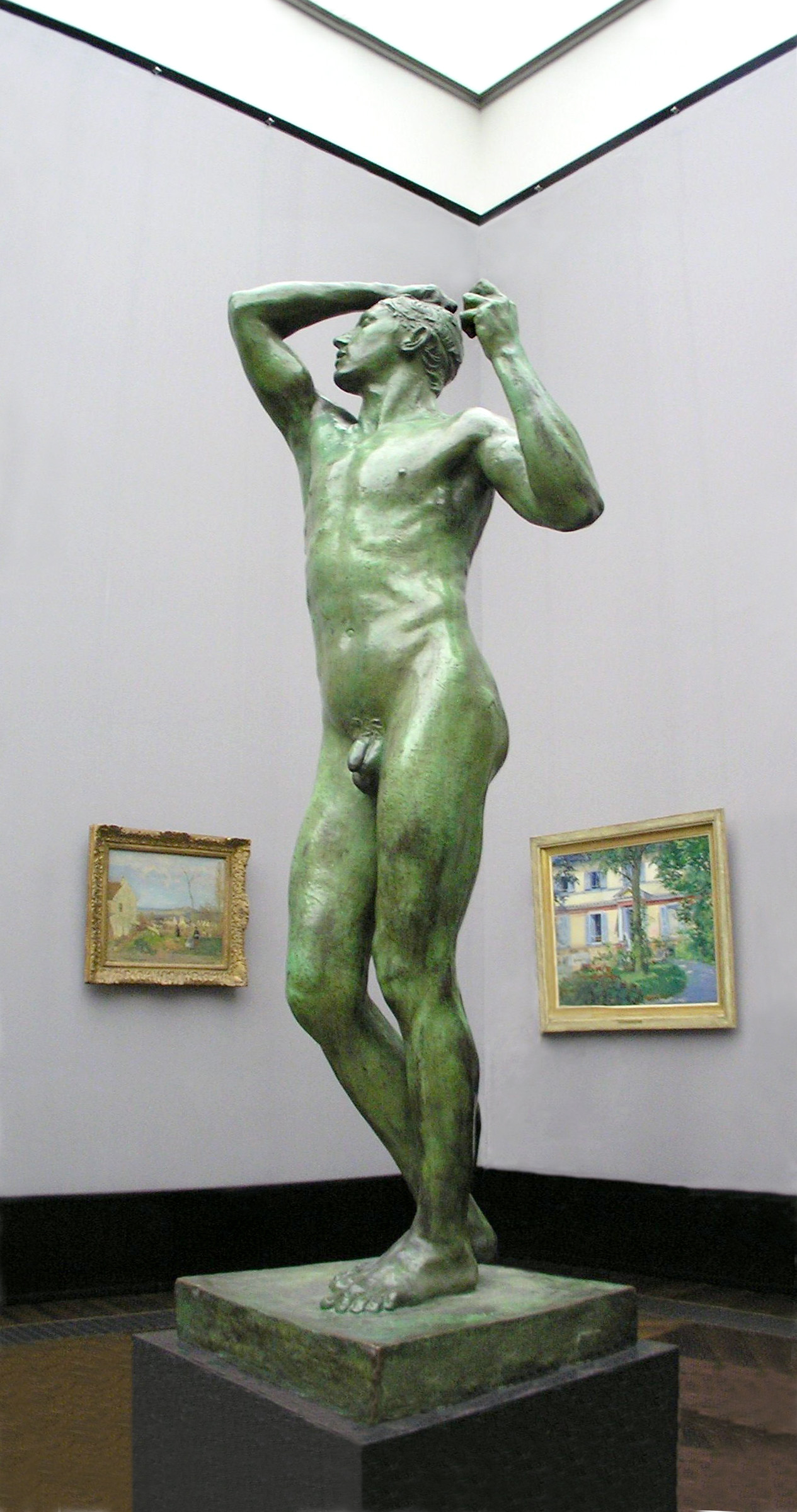
- The Age of Bronze, Alte Nationalgalerie, Berlin, Germany (2006).
- Artist: Auguste Rodin (1840–1917)
- Year: 1877 (first exhibited)
- Type: Statue
- Medium: Bronze
- Dimensions: Life size

The Age of Bronze (French: L'âge d'airain) is a bronze statue by the French sculptor Auguste Rodin (1840–1917). The figure is of a life-size nude male, 72 in. (182.9cm) high. Rodin continued to produce casts of the statue for several decades after it was modeled in 1876.

The sculpture is famous for its extreme naturalism, which prompted suspicion that it was a lifecast. Rodin had a Belgian soldier pose for the statue, keeping photographs which survive (in the Rodin Museum). The pose partly derives from Michelangelo's Dying Slave in the Louvre Museum, which has the elbow raised above the head. Rodin had studied Michelangelo's work on a trip to Italy, taking inspiration from his naturalism. Today, there are numerous casts of the statue held in major museum across the world

== History ==
The Age of Bronze was not Auguste Rodin's first life-size sculpture. Previously, he was creating a piece that was destroyed while moving studios titled Bacchante. Following the destruction of Bacchante, The Age of Bronze was meant to establish his reputation. At this time, Rodin's goal was to study the nude and create naturalistic sculptures. Rodin was unsatisfied with professional models due to their inability to convey the natural poses he wished to sculpt. To solve this problem, he employed a 22-year-old Belgian soldier, Auguste Neyt. The work was also influenced by Rodin's visit to Italy in 1876, where he sought inspiration from Michelangelo's depiction of the human form.

Originally, the figure held a spear, representing a warrior on the verge of defeat; however, Rodin removed the spear before displaying it to the public. This change drew attention to the figure's body and emotional state rather than the narrative content.

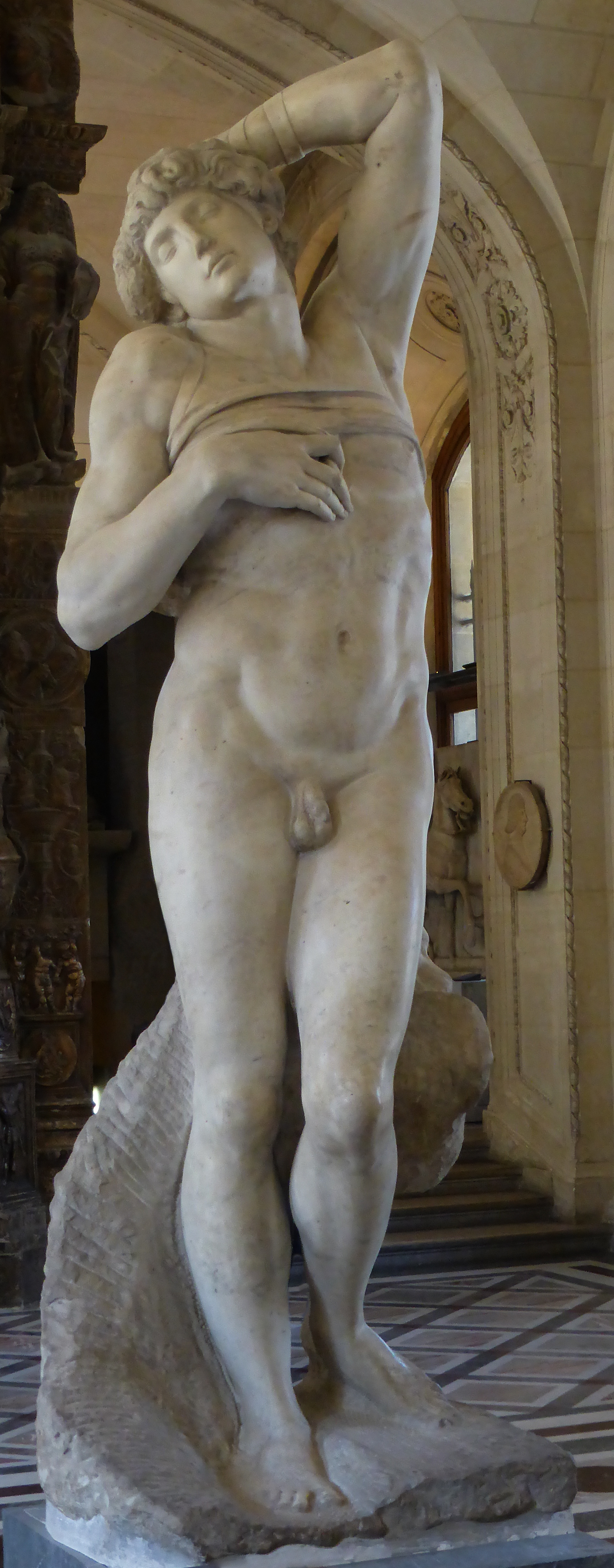
Michelangelo, The Dying Slave 1513-1516

3D model, click to interact.

== Reception ==
Rodin first exhibited the work under the title The Conquered Man at the Cercle Artistique in Brussels in January 1877. Belgian critics struggled to understand the absence of any identifiable subject matter, with one critic writing that Rodin had "forgotten only one thing and that is to explain his subject". Another critic, attempting to make sense of the work, speculated that it represented "a man on the verge of suicide". Belgian critics also raised suspicion that the work had been cast directly from the model.

Similar suspicions were expressed several months later, when the work was exhibited at the Salon in Paris, under the title The Age of Bronze. This suspicion benefited Rodin, though, because people were so eager to see this for themselves. Critics expressed other misgivings about the work; one described the figure as "a sickly nude fellow" while another complained that it possessed "neither character nor beauty".

== Analysis and interpretations ==
The Age of Bronze, being Rodin's first successful large sculpture, represents a long period of effort, training, struggle, and research. Much of the scholarship on the work examines the narrative ambiguity of the work, analyzing the pose of the figure for its psychological evocations. The weight shifting to the right side, the relaxing of the lips, and the way the head sits upon the shoulders, invite speculation about the man's suffering and inner life.

Scholars have also examined the work in relation to Rodin's goals of making naturalistic sculpture. The influence of Michelangelo's Dying Slave on the work has commonly been interpreted in terms of this aim. Scholars have also pointed to differences between the two sculptures, describing Rodin's figure as more agile, fluid, and naturalistic than Michelangelo's more rigidly defined work.

== Casts ==
Casts of the statue can be found in many museums, including:

Institution	City	Country
Albright–Knox Art Gallery	Buffalo, New York	United States
Alte Nationalgalerie	Berlin	Germany
Museum Folkwang	Essen	Germany
Schlossmuseum	Weimar	Germany
Chiado Museum	Lisbon	Portugal
Cleveland Museum of Art	Cleveland, Ohio	United States
Columbus Museum of Art	Columbus, Ohio	United States
Ny Carlsberg Glyptotek	Copenhagen	Denmark
Nationalmuseum	Stockholm	Sweden
Honolulu Museum of Art	Honolulu, Hawaii	United States
Hugh Lane Gallery	Dublin	Ireland
Instituto Ricardo Brennand	Recife	Brazil
Iris & B. Gerald Cantor Center for Visual Arts, Stanford University	Stanford, California	United States
Kunstmuseum	The Hague	Netherlands
Leeds Art Gallery	Leeds	England
Lycée Rodin, cour d'honneur	Paris	France
Maryhill Museum of Art	Maryhill, Washington	United States
Metropolitan Museum of Art	New York City, New York	United States
Middelheim Open Air Sculpture Museum	Antwerp	Belgium
Minneapolis Institute of Arts	Minneapolis, Minnesota	United States
Musée d'Orsay	Paris	France
Museum of Fine Arts of Lyon	Lyon	France
Musée Rodin	Paris	France
Museo Soumaya	Mexico City	Mexico
Museum of Fine Arts	Budapest	Hungary
Nasher Sculpture Center	Dallas, Texas	United States
National Gallery of Art	Washington, D.C.	United States
National Gallery of Canada	Ottawa, Ontario	Canada
National Museum of Western Art	Tokyo	Japan
New Orleans Museum of Art	New Orleans, Louisiana	United States
Princeton University Art Museum	Princeton, New Jersey	United States
Rodin Museum	Philadelphia, Pennsylvania	United States
Tokyo University of the Arts, The University Art Museum	Tokyo	Japan
Tokyo Fuji Art Museum	Tokyo	Japan
Victoria and Albert Museum	London	England
Museu Nacional d'Art de Catalunya	Barcelona	Spain
Burrell Collection	Glasgow	Scotland
Legion of Honor	San Francisco	United States
Queensland Art Gallery	Brisbane	Australia
Galleria Nazionale d'Arte Moderna	Rome	Italy
Manchester Art Gallery	Manchester	United Kingdom
Chrysler Museum of Art	Norfolk, Virginia	United States

== Gallery ==
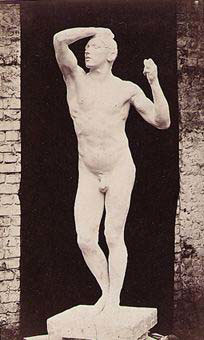
Plaster from 1877

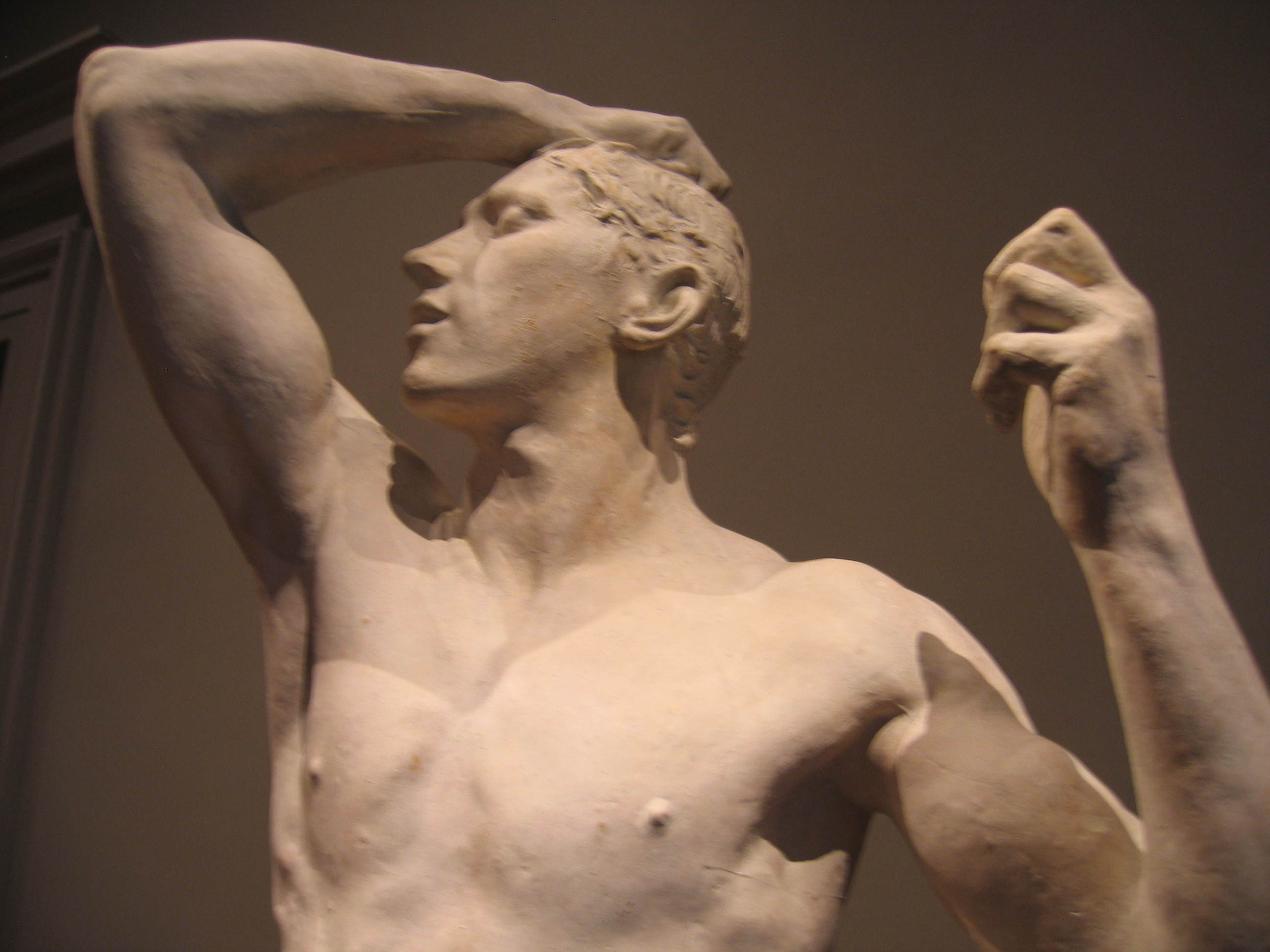
Plaster, detail

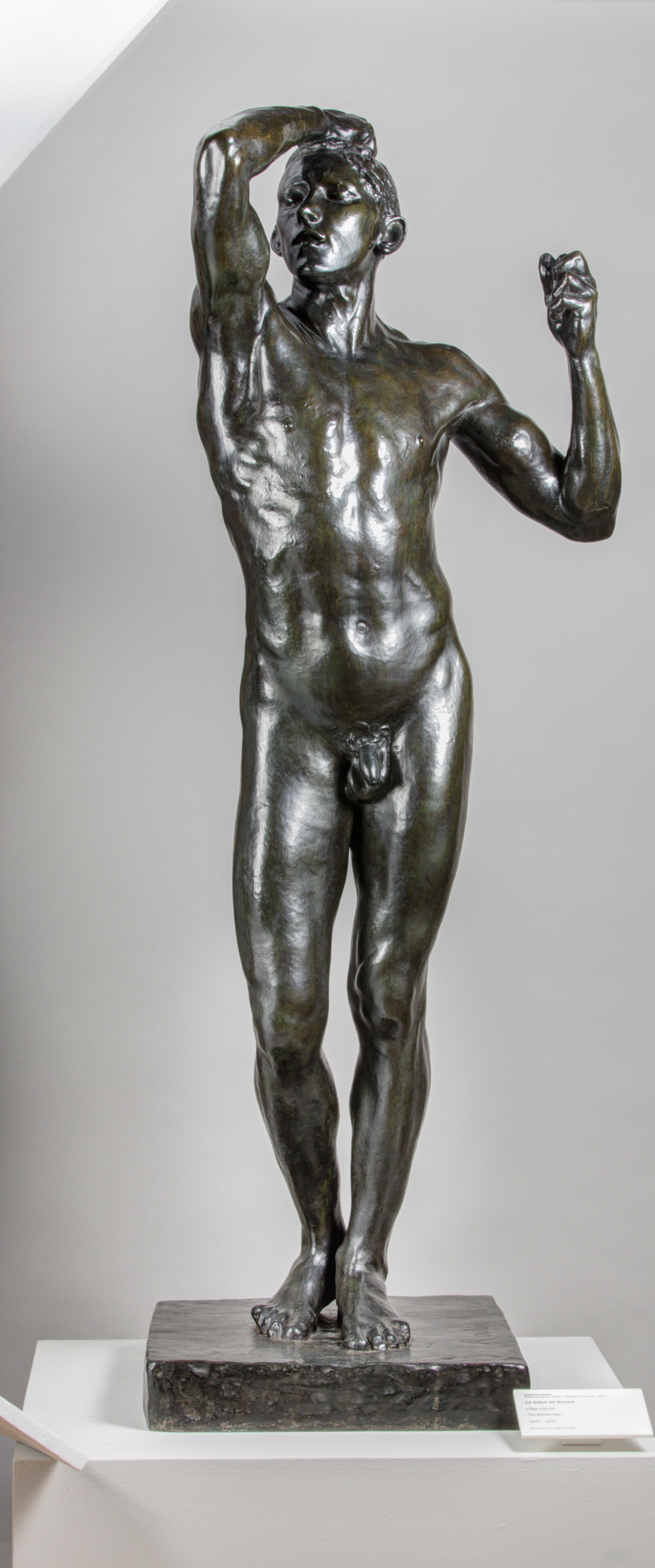
Bronze cast

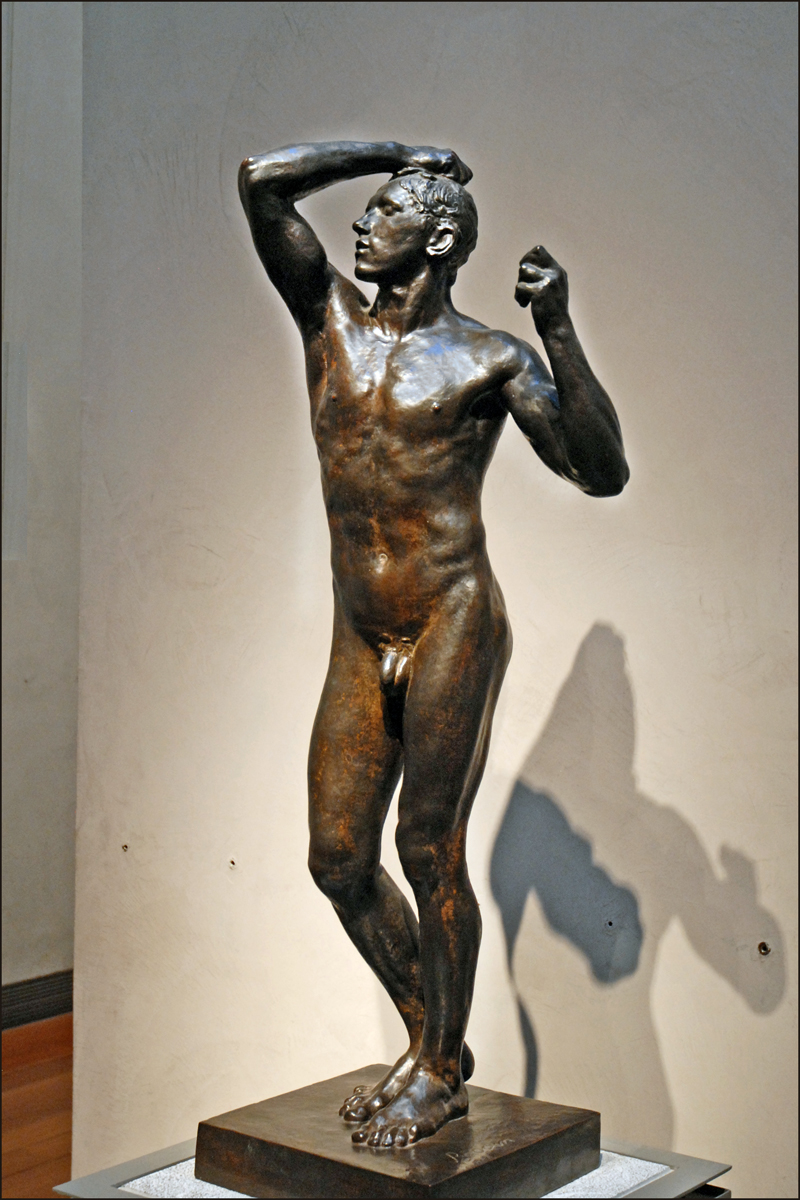
Bronze cast from 1876/1877 in Lyon

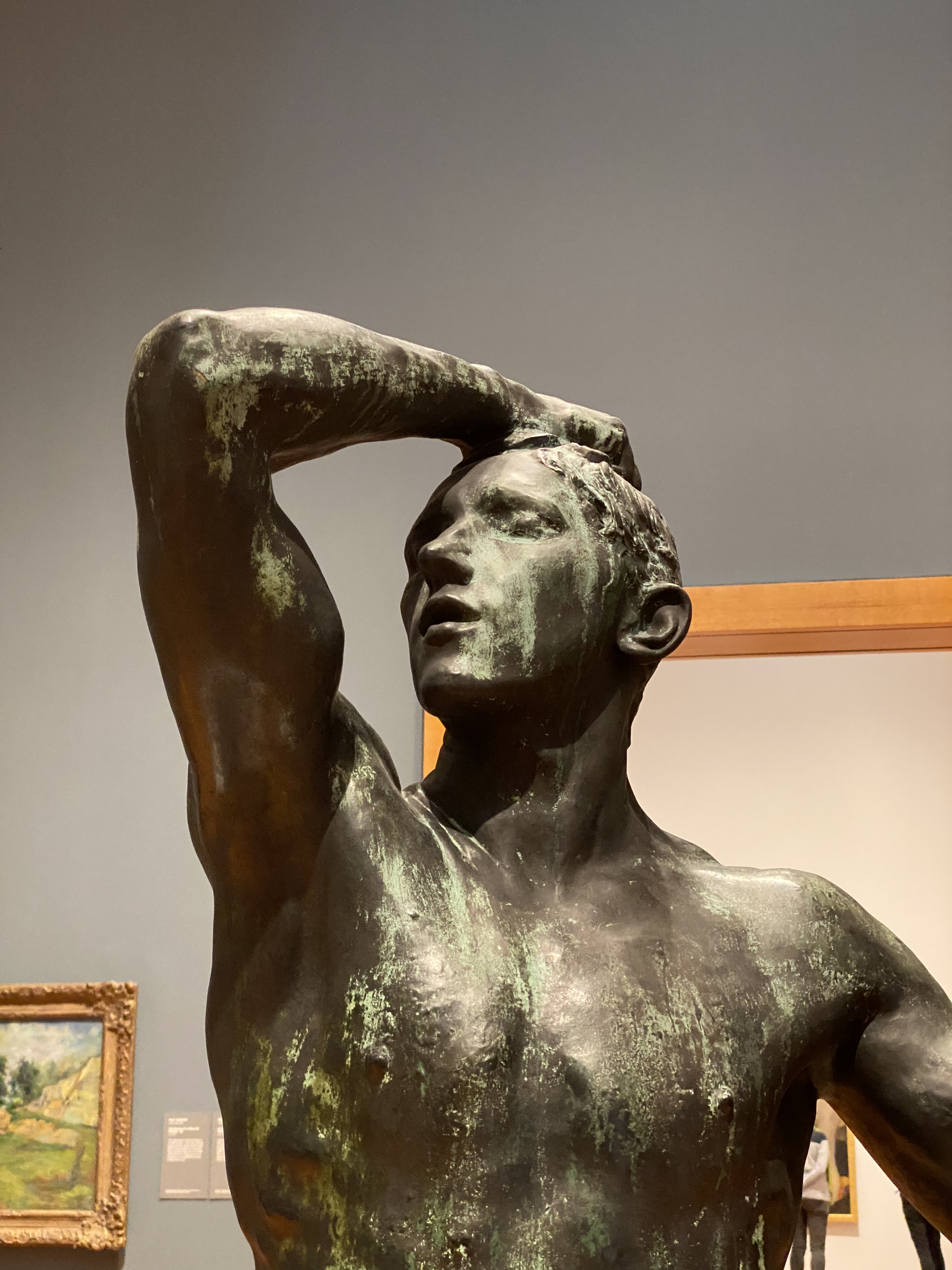
Detail of the bronze cast in the National Gallery of Canada, cast in 1901

== See also ==
- List of sculptures by Auguste Rodin
- 1877 in art

== Bibliography ==
- Le Normand-Romain, Antoinette; Judrin, Claude; Vassalo, I. (1997). Vers l'âge d'airain, Rodin en Belgique: Exposition. Paris: Musée Rodin editions. ISBN 978-2-901428-60-2.
