= Roger Gimbel =

American television producer (1925–2011)

- Gimbel in 1977
- Born: March 11, 1925; Philadelphia, Pennsylvania, U.S.
- Died: April 26, April 26, 2011 (aged 86); Los Angeles, California, U.S.
- Education: B.A. Yale University
- Spouse(s): ?? (m. 19??; div. 19??); Nancy Straus Gimbel (m. 19??; died 1972) Jennifer Warren (m. 1976)
- Children: 5
- Parent(s): Julia de Fernex Millhiser Gimbel; Richard Gimbel
- Family: Adam Gimbel (great-grandfather)

Roger Gimbel (March 11, 1925 – April 26, 2011) was an American television producer who specialized in television movies. Many of Gimbel's television films dealt with real-life events, including Chernobyl: The Final Warning, S.O.S. Titanic, The Amazing Howard Hughes, and The Autobiography of Miss Jane Pittman. Often, Gimbel's films also focused on serious societal problems, including mental illness, war, and domestic abuse. Gimbel produced more than 50 television films and specials, which earned eighteen Emmy Awards.

== Biography ==
Gimbel was born in Philadelphia, Pennsylvania on March 11, 1925 into the family who owned the Gimbels department store. His parents were Julia (née de Fernex Millhiser) and Richard Gimbel, a colonel in the United States Army Air Forces. He enrolled at Yale University, where he studied economics. Gimbel served as a member of the United States Army Air Forces in Italy during World War II.

In 1973, Gimbel won an Emmy with George Schaefer for their work as the executive producers of A War of Children (1972), which centered on Protestant and Catholic friends during the Northern Ireland conflict. His other credits as producer include The Glass House (1972), I Heard the Owl Call My Name (1973), The Autobiography of Miss Jane Pittman (1974), Tell Me Where It Hurts (1974), Queen of the Stardust Ballroom (1975), The Amazing Howard Hughes (1977), Shattered Dreams (1990), and Chernobyl: The Final Warning (1991).

== Personal life ==
Gimbel was married three times. His first marriage ended in divorce; his second wife, Nancy Straus Gimbel, died in 1972. In 1976, Gimbel married his third wife, actress Jennifer Warren. Roger Gimbel died from pneumonia at Cedars-Sinai Medical Center in Los Angeles on April 26, 2011 at the age of 86. He had four children with his second wife: Jeff, Stephen Martin (predeceased), Sam, and Liza; and a son, Barney, with Warren.

At one time when he lived in an 18th-floor Sutton Place apartment overlooking the East River, he liked to catch fish from his apartment window.
