= Jules E. Mastbaum Area Vocational Technical School =

Coordinates: 39.99246°N 75.11215°W

Location
- 3116 Frankford Ave. Philadelphia, Pennsylvania 19134; United States

Information
- Type: Public high school
- School district: The School District of Philadelphia
- Staff: 40.89 (FTE)
- Grades: 9–12
- Enrollment: 775 (2017–18)
- Student to teacher ratio: 18.95
- Mascot: panther
- Yearbook: the mast
- Website: mastbaum.philasd.org

The Jules E. Mastbaum Area Vocational/Technical School (commonly referred to as the Jules Mastbaum Area Vocational High School) is a public high school in Kensington, Philadelphia, Pennsylvania, United States. It is a part of the School District of Philadelphia and serves grades 9–12. It was named after Jules Ephraim Mastbaum.

== Trivia ==
In 1982 the basketball team members were short compared to those of other high schools. That year, the tallest player was six feet and three inches.

== Notable alumni ==
- Monty "Sherrick" Farley, former professional boxer, Pennsylvania Boxing Hall of Fame member
- James Brown, former NFL player
- Uhuru Hamiter, former NFL player
- Chafie Fields, former NFL player, sports agent
- Shep Shepherd (1917–2018), jazz musician, drummer, trombone player
- Lee Morgan (1938–1972), jazz musician, trumpet player
- Veronica Hamel, actor
- Maria Quiñones-Sánchez, former Philadelphia city council member
