= Uhuru Hamiter =

American football player (born 1973)

No. 90, 96, 91
- Position: Defensive end

Personal information
- Born: March 14, 1973 (age 53); Kingstree, South Carolina, U.S.
- Listed height: 6 ft 4 in (1.93 m)
- Listed weight: 280 lb (127 kg)

Career information
- High school: Mastbaum Tech (Philadelphia, Pennsylvania)
- College: Delaware State

Career history
- England Monarchs (1998); Philadelphia Eagles (1998)*; New Orleans Saints (1998–1999); Philadelphia Eagles (2000); Chicago Bears (2001)*; Philadelphia Eagles (2001); Houston Texans (2002)*
- * Offseason or practice squad member only

Career statistics
- Total tackles: 14
- Passes defended: 3
- Stats at Pro Football Reference

Uhuru A. "Joby" Hamiter (born March 14, 1973) is an American former professional football player who was a defensive end for three seasons in the National Football League (NFL) with the New Orleans Saints and Philadelphia Eagles. He played college football for the Delaware State Hornets. Hamiter was also a member of the New Jersey Rage, England Monarchs, Chicago Bears, and Houston Texans.

== Early life ==
Hamiter played high school football as a wide receiver at Jules E. Mastbaum Area Vocational Technical School in Philadelphia, Pennsylvania. He teamed with Marc Baxter and Barry Williams to lead Mastbaum to its first Public League Championship in football. He also excelled in basketball for the Panthers.

== College career ==
Hamiter played three seasons at Delaware State University for the Hornets from 1992 to 1994. He left college to work and was a security officer at the Ferris Juvenile Detention Center in New Castle, Delaware.

== Professional career ==
Hamiter played semi-pro football for the New Jersey Rage.

Hamiter then played for the England Monarchs of NFL Europe during the 1998 season. He played in ten games, recording seven sacks which ranked him fourth in the league.

Hamiter was signed by the Philadelphia Eagles on June 19, 1998. He was released by the Eagles on August 30, 1998.

Hamiter was a member of the New Orleans Saints from 1998 to 1999. He played in five games for the Saints during the 1999 season.

Hamiter played in seven games for the Eagles in 2000. He was released by the team on August 24, 2001.

Hamiter signed with the Chicago Bears on August 27, 2001, and released by the team on September 1, 2001.

Hamiter was once again signed by the Eagles on December 31, 2001. He played in one game for the Eagles during the 2001 season.

Hamiter signed with the Houston Texans on May 30, 2002. He was released by the Texans on August 25, 2002.
