= Alfred W. Fleisher =

American real estate investor and philanthropist

- Born: c. 1878; Philadelphia, Pennsylvania, U.S.
- Died: 25 December 1928 (aged 49–50); Philadelphia, Pennsylvania, U.S.
- Occupations: Real estate investor, philanthropist
- Spouse: Selma Gerstley
- Children: 2 sons, 1 daughter
- Relatives: Ralph J. Roberts (son-in-law); Brian L. Roberts (grandson)

Alfred W. Fleisher (c. 1878 - December 25, 1928) was an American real estate investor and philanthropist. He was the co-founder and head of Mastbaum Brothers & Fleisher, and the president of the board of trustees of the Eastern State Penitentiary. He supported prison reform.

== Life ==
Fleisher was born circa 1878 in Philadelphia. He began his career in real estate with Stanley Mastbaum in his hometown, with an office on Walnut Street. They were joined by Stanley's brother Jules in 1912, and the firm became known as Mastbaum Brothers & Fleisher. Jules Mastbaum died in 1926, and Fleisher became the head of the firm.

Fleisher was a philanthropist. He donated to the Jewish Federation of Charities in Philadelphia, and he served as the president of the board of trustees of the Eastern State Penitentiary. He supported prison reform, including providing prisoners with employment opportunities, and he "felt that work in the open amid healthful surroundings would help the convicts both physically and morally." Fleisher supported their families financially while they were away, and he helped them once they left prison.

Fleisher married Selma Gerstley, the daughter of German-born Jewish philanthropist William Gerstley, and they resided in Wyncote, Pennsylvania near Philadelphia. They had two sons, Howard and Robert, and a daughter, Susan. Fleisher was a member of Congregation Keneseth Israel, and he was one of the largest collectors of etchings in the U.S. He died on December 25, 1928, in Wyncote, at age 50. His daughter married Ralph J. Roberts, the founder of Comcast. His grandson, Brian L. Roberts, serves as its chairman and chief executive officer.
