= Jules E. Mastbaum =

American movie theater magnate and philanthropist (1872–1926)

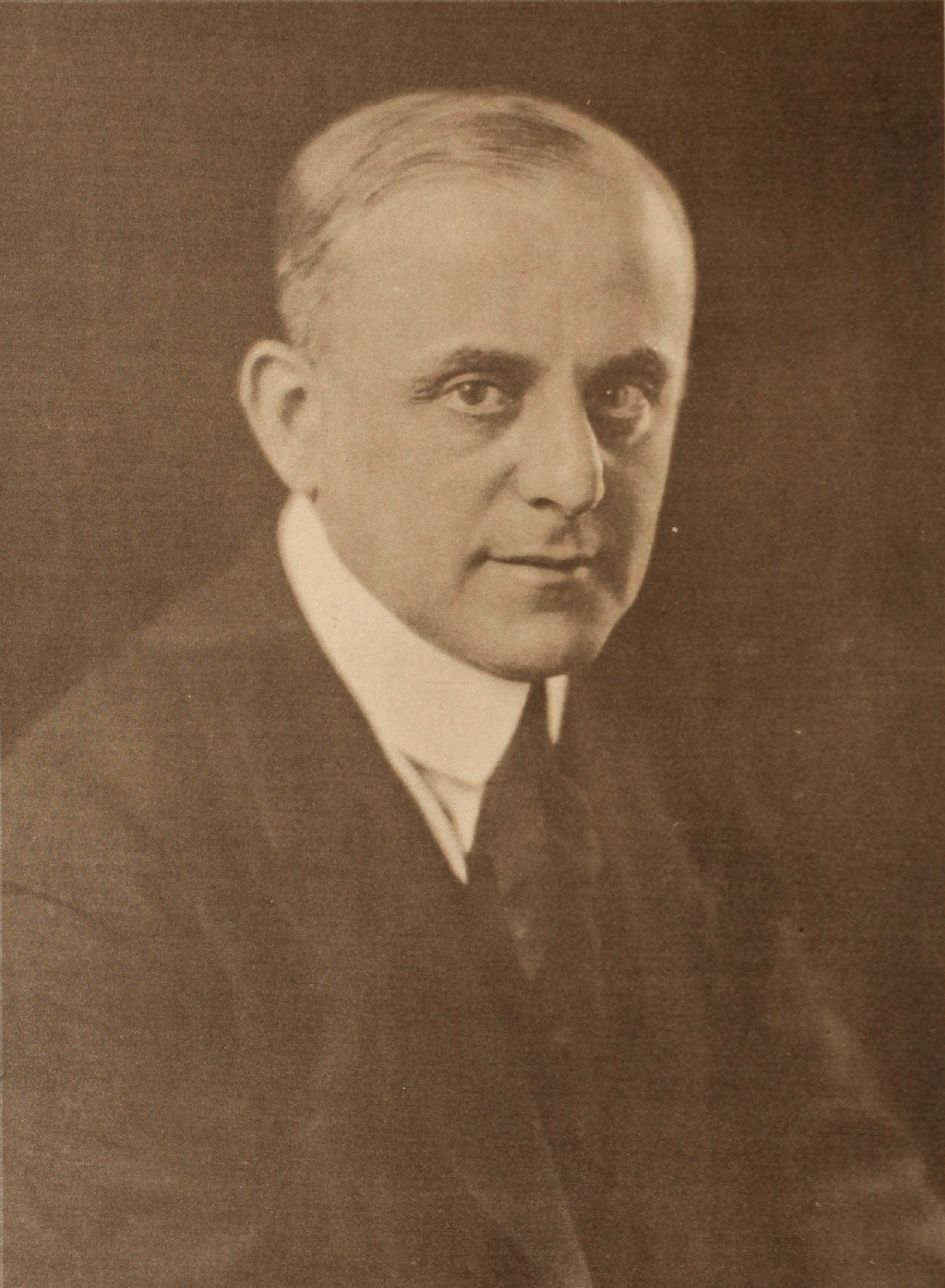
- Born: Jules Ephraim Mastbaum; July 7, 1872; Philadelphia, Pennsylvania, U.S.
- Died: December 8, 1926 (age 54)
- Education: B.A. University of Pennsylvania
- Occupation: Movie theater owner
- Spouse: Etta Wedell Mastbaum
- Children: Peggy Solomon
- Parent(s): Fannie Ephraim Mastbaum; Levi Mastbaum
- Family: Richard Gimbel (nephew); Benjamin M. Golder (son-in-law); Charles J. Solomon (son-in-law)

Jules Ephraim Mastbaum (July 7, 1872 – December 8, 1926) was a Philadelphia movie theater magnate and philanthropist. He donated the Rodin Museum and its collection to the city of Philadelphia. His daughter, Peggy Solomon, was a bridge champion.

== Biography ==
Mastbaum was born to a Jewish family in Philadelphia in 1872, the son of Fannie (née Ephraim) and Levi Mastbaum. He had one brother, Stanley V. Mastbaum; and two sisters who both married sons of Adam Gimbel, the founder of Gimbels department store, Minnie Mastbaum Gimbel (married to Ellis A. Gimbel Sr.); and Julia Mastbaum Gimbel (married to Louis Stanley Gimbel). He attended public schools and the Central Manual School, earning a scholarship to the University of Pennsylvania, where he graduated with a degree in Finance. After school, he took a job as a clerk at the Gimbels Department Store in Danville, Illinois, after which he was transferred to their Milwaukee store and then to their Philadelphia store where he became Gimbels' European representative earning $7,500 per annum, then Gimbel's highest salary.

Mastbaum began investing in real estate by purchasing Felix Isman's portfolio with his brother Stanley and Alfred W. Fleisher as partners forming the firm Mastbaum Brothers and Fleisher. He opened the first nickelodeon in Philadelphia at an empty storefront at 8th and Market and he then went on to purchase the Regent Theatre in 1911. He successively began to purchase more theatres with his company Motion Picture Company of America which he changed to Central Market Street Company and then Stanley Company of America in honor of his brother who died in 1918. In 1918, the company operated thirty-four theatres; in May 1926, an $80,000,000 merger added two hundred and twenty-five theatres to his chain and the Stanley Company of America became the largest theatre chain in the world.

After his death in 1926, his wife assumed control of Stanley Company of America.

== Personal life ==
Maustbaum was married to Etta Wedell Mastbaum, the daughter of Rachel P. Lit who founded the original store that became Lit Brothers; they had three daughters: Louisette "Billie" Mastbaum Wolf Dickson, Margery "Peggy" Mastbaum Solomon, and Elizabeth Mastbaum.

Mastbaum was a member of Congregation Mikveh Israel and was eulogized at his funeral by the synagogue's clergy, Dr Leon Elmaleh. Mastbaum was interred at Philadelphia's Mt. Sinai Cemetery.

== Legacy ==
- Donation of the Rodin Museum
- Jules Mastbaum Vocational/Technical School named after him
