= Etta Wedell Mastbaum =

- Born: September 6, 1886; Philadelphia, Pennsylvania, U.S.
- Died: November 1, 1953 (age 67); Manhattan, New York, U.S.
- Spouse: Jules Mastbaum
- Children: 2 including Peggy Solomon
- Parent(s): Rachel Lit Wedell; Philip M. Wedell
- Family: Richard Gimbel (nephew); Benjamin M. Golder (son-in-law); Charles J. Solomon (son-in-law)

Etta Wedell Mastbaum (September 6, 1886 – November 1, 1953) was an American philanthropist, department store executive, art collector, and director of a national chain of motion picture theaters.

== Biography ==
Born Etta Lit Wedell to a Jewish family on September 6, 1886, in Philadelphia, the daughter of Rachel Lit and Philip M. Wedell. Her mother founded the original store that became Lit Brothers in 1891. Etta attended the Philadelphia Seminary for Women. In 1904, she married theatre owner Jules Mastbaum.

=== Collecting Rodin’s works ===
While traveling in Europe in the 1920s, Etta and her husband were intrigued by sculptor Auguste Rodin. That led to a lifetime of collecting his works and eventually amassing the largest collection — after Rodin’s own — of Rodin’s sculptures, bas-reliefs, drawings, books, and letters. The French government permitted them to remove the artworks from France, provided they be exhibited in a permanent structure open to the public. The Mastbaums built the Jacques Gréber and Paul Cret designed Rodin Museum in Philadelphia.

After the death of her husband in 1926, Etta donated the collection to the people of Philadelphia in his honor. She also donated a bronze cast by Rodin, The Gates of Hell, to France — which resulted in her being decorated by the government of France. She assumed control of her husband's company Stanley Company of America and served as an executive of her family's company Lit Brothers.

She served as a second vice president of the Mastbaum Loan System, a not-for profit dedicated to providing financial assistance to the poor. She was also an active donor to the American Red Cross and Emergency Aid of Philadelphia.

=== Family life ===
Etta and Jules Mastbaum had three daughters: Louisette "Billie" Mastbaum Wolf Dickson, Margery "Peggy" Mastbaum Solomon, and Elizabeth Mastbaum. Etta was a member of Congregation Mikveh Israel in Philadelphia. She died at age 67 in 1953, in Manhattan.
