= Walter Kaitz Foundation =

Walter Kaitz Logo

The Walter Kaitz Foundation is a not-for-profit organization to further diversity initiatives within the television industry and in the media. The Foundation carries out studies, provides sponsorship's, partnerships and grants. They also promotes inclusion and participation of women and multi-ethnic people of color in the industry.

== History ==
The foundation was established in 1980 in honor of Walter Kaitz, a Russian immigrant who was president of the California Cable Television Association (CCTA) from the early 1960s until his death in 1979. Kaitz graduated from Harvard University after attending on a scholarship for newspaper carriers, and later graduated from the University of California Boalt Law School. He was a vocal advocate of equal opportunities for individuals in business. His son, Spencer Kaitz, succeeded the elder Kaitz as President of the CCTA, and started The Walter Kaitz Foundation after receiving contributions in his father’s honor from industry colleagues.

With offices in Washington, D.C., the Walter Kaitz Foundation is co-located with the National Cable & Telecommunications Association, a cable industry public affairs organization. The foundation’s executive director is Michelle Ray. Michelle successfully developed the Foundation’s decade-old Hollywood Creative Forum, the first program of its kind uniting the efforts of the television industry, the Writers Guild of America, the Directors Guild of America, the Producers Guild of America and the Television Academy of Arts and Sciences designed to match credentialed content creators of color with networks, studios and production companies serving the industry.

The foundation raises funds from cable industry participants and disburses them through three independent not-for-profit organizations: The Emma L. Bowen Foundation, which prepares minority youth for careers in the media industry; the National Association for Multi-Ethnicity in Cable, which helps people of color identify mentors and advance their careers; and Women in Cable & Telecommunications, which provides career guidance and training for women in the communications field.

From 2004 to 2020 the Foundation distributed over $20 million in support of programs and initiatives.

== Annual Dinner event ==
Much of the funding for the Walter Kaitz Foundation comes from an annual dinner the organization presents to celebrate Diversity Week, a series of meetings and events sponsored by cable industry organizations in New York City. The dinner honors individuals from within and outside of the cable industry who have demonstrated a commitment to diversity.

The foundation’s Annual Dinner, held in September in New York City, is a premiere social event for the cable industry, attracting top-level executives and industry professionals. The dinner raises funding for the Walter Kaitz Foundation and the organizations it supports.

At its 24th annual fund-raising dinner in New York City in 2007, the Foundation raised about $1.7 million. In 2018 the Foundation raised about $1.4 million. In 2019 the Dinner was attended by about 800 persons who represented 68 organizations and companies.
