= Nosson =

Nosson (Ashkenazic form of Nathan (Hebrew: נָתָן) may refer to:

- Rabbi Nosson Scherman, an American Haredi Orthodox rabbi
- Rabbi Nosson Tzvi Finkel (Mir) (1943–2011), the Rosh Yeshiva of the Mir Yeshiva in Beis Yisroel, Jerusalem
- Rabbi Nosson Tzvi Finkel (Slabodka) (1849–1927), leader of Orthodox Judaism in Eastern Europe
- Rabbi Shlomo Nosson Kotler (1856–1920), Orthodox rabbi, Rosh yeshiva and Talmudic scholar
- Rabbi Nosson Slifkin, known as the "Zoo Rabbi" (born 1975)
- Rabbi Noson Sternhartz (1780–1844), main student of Rebbe Nachman of Breslov

== See also ==
- Avos de-Rebbi Nosson

== Related surnames ==
- Nathanson (Natanson, Nathansohn)
