= Cotter =

Cotter may refer to:

- Cotter pin (disambiguation), a pin or wedge used to fix parts rigidly together
- Cotter (farmer), the Scots term for a peasant farmer formerly in the Scottish highlands
- Cotter (surname), a surname (including a list of people with the name)
- Cotter, Arkansas, United States
- Cotter, Iowa, United States
- Mount Cotter, a mountain in California, United States
- Cotter River, a river in the Australian Capital Territory

== See also ==
- McCotter, a surname
- The Cottars, a Canadian musical group
- Kotter (disambiguation)
- Cottler
