= Kotler =

Kotler is a Jewish surname. Notable people with the surname include:

- Aharon Kotler (1892–1962), Haredi rabbi and rosh yeshiva
- Malkiel Kotler (born 1951), Haredi rabbi and rosh yeshiva
- Oded Kotler (born 1937), Israeli actor and theater director
- Oshrat Kotler (born 1965), Israeli journalist, television news presenter, and author
- Philip Kotler (born 1931), American marketing author, consultant, and professor emeritus
- Robert Kotler (born 1942), American plastic surgeon
- Shlomo Nosson Kotler (1856–c. 1920), Orthodox posek and rosh yeshiva
- Shneur Kotler (1918–1982), Haredi rabbi and rosh yeshiva

== See also ==
- Kottler (disambiguation)
- Cotler
