= Sally Phipps =

American actress (1911–1978)

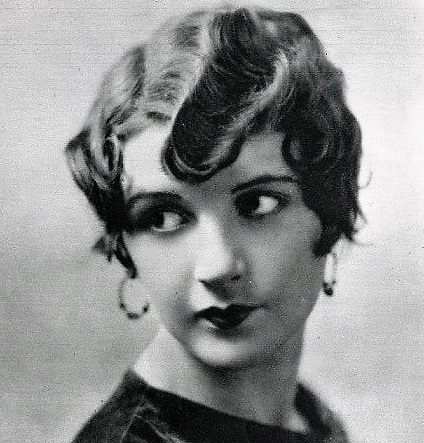
- Phillips in 1928
- Born: Nellie Bernice Bogdon; May 25, 1911; Oakland, California, U.S.
- Died: March 17, 1978 (aged 66); Brooklyn, New York, U.S.
- Other names: Byrnece Beautler; Bernice Sawyer
- Occupation: Actress
- Years active: 1915–1931
- Spouses: Benedict Gimbel Jr. (m. 1931; div. 1935) Alfred Marion Harned (m. 1941; div. 1956)
- Children: 2

Sally Phipps (born Byrnece Beutler; May 25, 1911 – March 17, 1978) was an American actress.

== Early life and career ==
The daughter of Mr. and Mrs. Albert Edward Bogdon, Sally Phipps was born Nellie Bernice Bogdon in Oakland, California on May 25, 1911. She attended Tamalpais High School and was a sales girl in a department store in San Francisco before she began acting.

She was only three years old and the veteran winner of several beautiful baby contests when she appeared under the name Bernice Sawyer as the Baby in the film Broncho Billy And The Baby, made at the Niles, California, Essanay Studio in late 1914. She made two more Broncho Billy westerns there in early 1915, The Western Way and The Outlaw's Awakening.

Fox studio gave her the name Sally Phipps in 1926, when she was 15. Until 1929, she was a Fox Film star who appeared in well over 20 films, including a cameo in F. W. Murnau's classic Sunrise. She was originally discovered by director Frank Borzage while still attending Fairfax High School in Los Angeles, California. She began her work at the studio starring in two-reel comedies.

Her first was Light Wines And Bearded Ladies (1926). Other comedies, both in 1927, were Girls and Gentlemen Prefer Scotch. Her first role in a feature was in Bertha, the Sewing Machine Girl (1926). Soon after, she was selected as one of the 13 1927 WAMPAS Baby Stars. Her first starring role in a feature was Love Makes 'Em Wild (1927).

A May 4, 1927 review in the Appleton Post-Crescent complimented her skill as a performer in Love Makes 'Em Wild:

Miss Phipps is one of the most charming actresses we have had the privilege of seeing in many a day. She has a personality which is distinctly individual, to say the least, and flirts across the silver sheet with a grace which would become an actress of many more years experience.

In August 1927, she signed a five-year contract with Sol M. Wurtzel, personal secretary to William Fox. Fox sent Wurtzel to supervise West Coast productions for his studio in 1917. Phipps' Fox Film contract for October 1927 stipulated she was bound to the studio for a period of five years. She would be paid a starting wage of $125, which would rise to $600 a week for the last six months before expiration.

Phipps starred in the very popular High School Hero, with leading man Nick Stuart, which opened in late 1927. She was also the female lead for the 1928 Fox features Why Sailors Go Wrong, News Parade, and None but the Brave. Her co-star for the first two films was Nick Stuart. The other co-starred Charles Morton. The News Parade is about the life of a Fox News cameraman and the daughter of a camera-shy millionaire. The motion picture was filmed in New York City, Lake Placid, New York, Palm Beach, Florida, and Havana, Cuba.

Her last screen appearance at Fox was in the 1929 two-reel comedy talkie Detectives Wanted, starring Clark and McCullough. Two years later, she appeared on Broadway in the Kaufman and Hart comedy spoof of Hollywood, Once In A Lifetime (1930-1931), playing Susan Walker, the movie-struck ingenue.

While on Broadway, she appeared as the female lead to Joe Penner in his 1931 Vitaphone two-reel comedy, Where Men Are Men. In it, she played Nancy Carter, a Western comedy vamp. In 1935, she again played a movie-struck ingenue in another Broadway comedy, Knock On Wood, by Allen Rivkin. In this show, she used "Sallie Phipps" as a stage name.

== Personal life ==
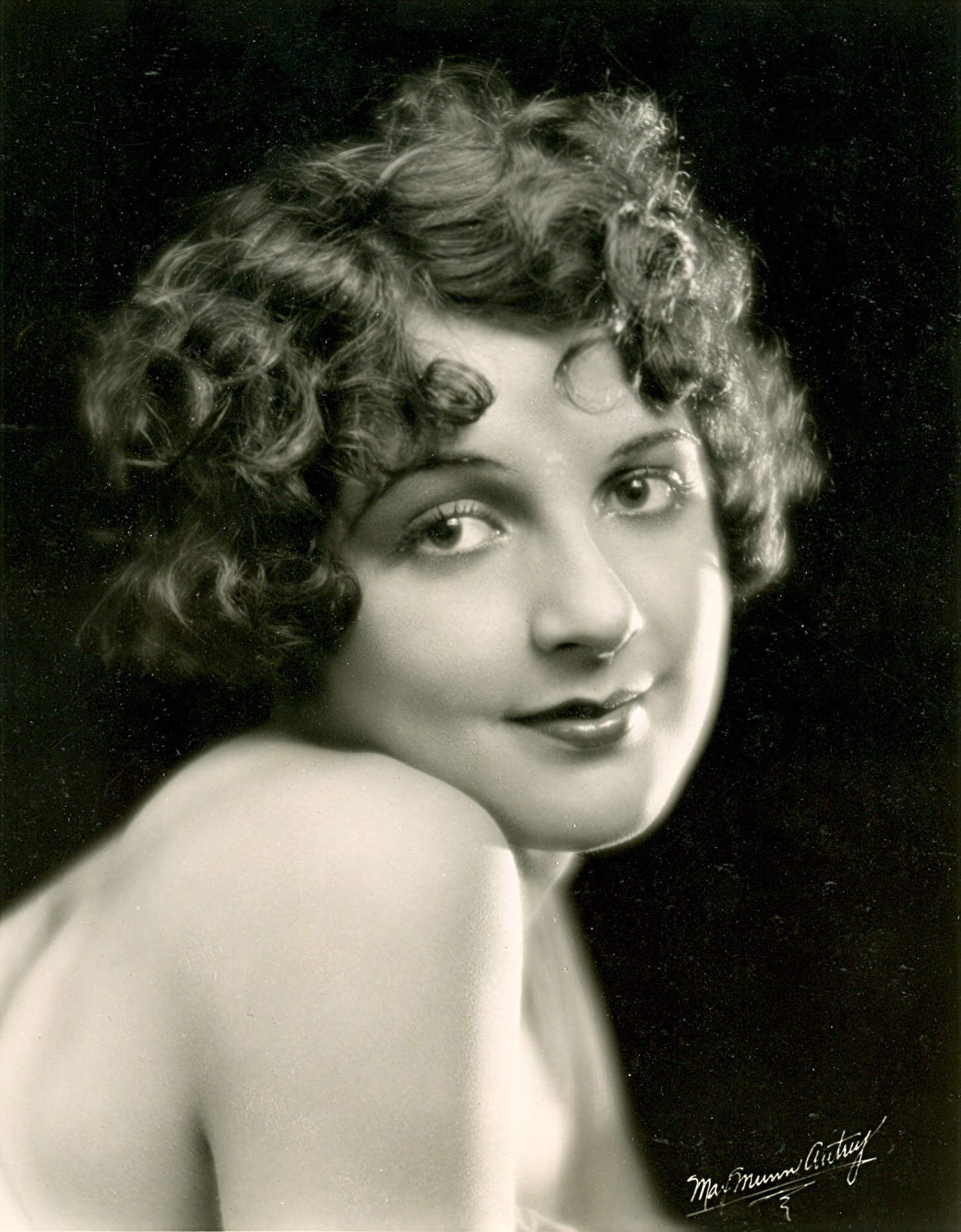
Phipps c. 1930

On June 6, 1931, she married Gimbels department-store heir Benedict Gimbel Jr. (the grandson of Adam Gimbel and father of Ted Nathanson), and moved to Philadelphia; they divorced in 1935.

In 1941, she married New York musician Alfred Marion Harned in Coyoacan, Mexico; they had two children, Maryanna and Robert, both born in Des Moines, Iowa; they divorced in 1956.

== Death ==
Phipps died in Long Island College Hospital in Brooklyn, New York on March 17, 1978, at the age of 66.

== Papers ==
In the summer of 2019, The Sally Phipps Archive was accepted into the Margaret Herrick Library of the Academy of Motion Picture Arts And Sciences in Hollywood, California. The Archive, now known as the "Sally Phipps Papers", consists of extensive pictorial material, including hundreds of scene stills from her films made at Fox, Essanay Niles, and Warner Brothers Vitaphone; from her two Broadway shows; publicity and pinup photos; and also 16mm prints of a couple of her films, lobby cards, posters, glass slides, theater programs, and heralds.

== Sources ==
- Los Angeles Times, "Players Will Aid Exhibit", April 28, 1927, p. A8.
- Appleton Post-Crescent, "Comedy Galore In Fox Film At Bijou", Wednesday Evening, May 4, 1927, p. 11.
- Los Angeles Times, "New Comedy Recruits", July 17, 1927, p. J4.
- Los Angeles Times, "Girls Sign Pledge To Keep Thin", October 12, 1927, p. A1.
- "A Summary of Sally." Photoplay, April 1928, p. 67.
- Manners, Dorothy. "Kute, Kool and Kalm; Twenty Years From Now Sally Phipps Might Take Pictures Seriously." Motion Picture Classic, October 1928, pp. 42, 77.
- Wilson, Earl. "Wampas Ex-Baby Lives on WPA $23 – And Likes It." New York Post, June 21, 1938, p. 11.
- Frank, Gerold. "Ex-Film Starlet, Ex-Rich Wife, Happy in $23 Job." New York Journal And American, June 26, 1938, p. E-3.
- "Phipps, Sally." Filmlexicon degli autori e delle opere. Roma: Edizioni di Bianco e Nero, 1962, p. 582.
- Griffo, Richard. "Erik Rhodes, Sally Phipps Receive Rosemary Awards." Classic Film Collector, Winter 1976, no. 53, p. x-16.
- Roberts, John. "Sally Phipps." Classic Images, November 1984, pp. 57, 63.
- "Phipps, Sally." Ragan, David. Who's Who In Hollywood; The Largest Cast of International Film Personalities. New York: Facts On File, 1992, 2v.
- Diliberto, Gioia. "The Flapper Doesn't Change Her Spots (Sally Phipps)." New York Times Style Magazine T, February 24, 2008, pp. 192, 194.
- Harned, Robert L. "Sally Phipps, Silent Film Star." Classic Images, March 2014, pp. 6–15, 70.
- Robuck, Erica. Fallen Beauty. New York: New American Library, 2014. (quote from the novel: "... take me to a picture at the Crandall Theater. 'The High School Hero' with Nick Stuart and gorgeous Sally Phipps is playing. ...")
- Harned, Robert L. Sally Phipps: Silent Film Star, by her son. Brooklyn, NY: Robert L. Harned, 2015. (this book, in both digital (November 2014) and print (June 2015) editions, includes extensive filmography, bibliography of books, magazine and newspaper articles, and index)
- Harned, Robert L. "Sally Phipps At Essanay: A Silent Star Begins Her Career." Silent Film Quarterly, Vol. 1, Issue 2, Winter 2015–2016, pp. 32–37.
- Harned, Robert L. "The Borzages Of Hollywood And Sally Phipps: As Told By Her Son." Silent Film Quarterly, Vol. 2, Issue 1, Fall 2016, pp. 41–44.
- "Phipps, Sally." Massa, Steve. Slapstick Divas: The Women of Silent Comedy. Albany, GA: BearManor Media, 2017, p. 567.
- Harned, Robert L. Sally Phipps Archive: An Illustrated Catalogue, by her son. Brooklyn, NY: Robert L. Harned, 2018.
- Harned. Robert L. "Sally Phipps and Influenza [1928 Hollywood Epidemic]." Classic Images, June 2020, p. 24.
