= Kotter =

Kotter or Kötter may refer to:

- Kötter, a type of European cottager

== People with the surname ==
- John Kotter (born 1947), American academic and business author
- Ernst Kötter (1859–1922), German mathematician
- Hans Kotter (1480–1541), German composer and organist
- Kim Kötter (born 1982), Dutch beauty queen
- Klaus Kotter (1934–2010), German president of the International Bobsleigh and Skeleton Federation

== See also ==
- Welcome Back, Kotter, a TV show
- Kottler (disambiguation), a surname
- Cotter (disambiguation)
- Kotte (surname)
