= Michael Nathanson (film executive) =

- Born: Michael G. Nathanson; 1955 or 1956 (age 70–71)
- Education: B.A. Ithaca College
- Occupation: Studio executive
- Spouse: Diana Victoria Lands (m. 1990)
- Children: 3
- Parent: Ted Nathanson (father)
- Family: Benedict Gimbel Jr. (grandfather); Adam Gimbel (great-great-grandfather)

Michael Nathanson (born 1955/1956) is an American film industry executive who was head of MGM Pictures for seven years, beginning in 1997.

== Early life and education ==
Nathanson was raised in New York City, the son of Edith (née Landesman) and Ted Nathanson. His father was a director at NBC, including the original Tonight Show, and the Today Show and later the coordinating producer for numerous national sporting events for NBC Sports. His mother was a producer at ABC who worked on The Perry Como Show. His paternal grandfather, Benedict Gimbel Jr., founded one of the first radio stations in Philadelphia (his father was born Benedict Gimbel III but changed his surname to that of his mother). His great-great-grandfather was Adam Gimbel, the founder of Gimbel Brothers department store. He has two sisters who are also in the industry, Laura Nathanson Knobloch, a vice president at Fox Television, and Carla Nathanson Hoffman, who worked on the David Letterman Show.

== Career ==
Nathanson began his career at NBC Sports in New York City and then moved to Los Angeles in 1975, where he worked as a production assistant on the 1977 films The Deep and Sinbad and the Eye of the Tiger. From 1980 to 1984, he worked at United Artists. In 1987, he went to work for Columbia Pictures and in 1989, was named senior production executive and later president of worldwide production, where he oversaw the production of such films as Awakenings, The Prince of Tides, Boyz n the Hood, and A River Runs Through It. In 1994, he was named as chairman and chief executive of Arnon Milchan's New Regency Productions, where he oversaw such films as A Time to Kill, Tin Cup, Natural Born Killers, Heat, Free Willy, Free Willy 2: The Adventure Home, and Copycat. In February 1997, Frank Mancuso hired him to serve as president of MGM Pictures, replacing Mike Marcus. At MGM, he oversaw the production of Windtalkers, Bandits, Rollerball, Killing Me Softly, and Hart's War. He stayed at MGM for seven years and then took a position as CEO of production at ONC Entertainment, where he oversaw such films as L.A. Confidential, Balls Out: Gary the Tennis Coach, and Yours, Mine & Ours. In 2012, Nathanson was named along with Bill Lischak as co-presidents of OddLot Entertainment by its CEO and founder, Gigi Pritzker. OddLot disbanded in 2015.

== Personal life ==
In 1990, he married Diana Victoria Lands.
