= Benedict Gimbel =

American businessman (1899–1971)

- Born: Benedict Gimbel Jr. 1899; Philadelphia, Pennsylvania
- Died: February 6, 1971 (age 71); Manhattan, New York City
- Spouse(s): Ethel S. Nathanson (divorced) Sally Phipps (m. 1931; div. 1935) J. Jessie Kane
- Children: Ted Nathanson
- Family: Adam Gimbel (grandfather); Bernard Gimbel (cousin); Richard Gimbel (cousin); Michael Nathanson (grandson)

Benedict Gimbel Jr. (1899 – February 6, 1971) was an American businessman, department store executive, and founder of one of the first radio stations in Philadelphia.

== Biography ==
Benedict Gimbel Jr. was born to a Jewish family in Philadelphia, the son of Birdie (née Loeb) and Benedict Gimbel Sr. His grandfather was Adam Gimbel of the Gimbel Brothers retailing family. His father worked as an executive at the family business and killed himself in Hoboken in 1907 despondent after being charged with a serious crime. Gimbel attended public schools in Philadelphia as well as the Thorpe School in Stamford, Connecticut and the boys’ boarding school La Villa in Ouchy, Switzerland. He attended the Wharton School at the University of Pennsylvania, but left during his sophomore year to join the U.S. Army during World War I, where he reached the rank of sergeant. He finished his studies when he returned and then went to work for the family business in Philadelphia. In 1921, he resigned as vice president and board member of Gimbels Brothers to serve as the first president and manager of WIP radio, one of the first radio stations in Philadelphia. The station started broadcasting on March 17, 1922 from its studio above the Gimbels department store in Philadelphia. In 1931, WIP purchased WFAN and consolidated all broadcasting at the WIP studios. In 1932, the station was transferred to the newly formed company, the Pennsylvania Broadcasting Company, as it was fully profitable on its own, In 1958, Gimbel put together an investor group (including Bob Hope) and purchased WIP from Gimbels for $2,500,000. In 1960, John W. Kluge's Metromedia bought WIP for $4.500,000; Gimbel remained as a vice president.

== Personal life ==
Gimbel was married thrice. His first marriage was to Ethel S. (née Nathanson) with whom he had a son, Edward "Ted" Nathanson (his son took his mother's maiden name after his parents divorced). In 1931, he married actress Sally Phipps; they divorced in 1935. His third wife was J. Jessie Kane. Gimbel died on February 6, 1971.
