= Ted Nathanson =

American television director (1925–1997)

- Born: Benedict Gimbel III; 1925
- Died: June 6, 1997 (age 72)
- Spouse: Edith Landesman
- Children: Michael Nathanson; Laura Nathanson Knobloch; Carla Nathanson Hoffman
- Parent(s): Benedict Gimbel Jr. Ethel S. Nathanson
- Family: Adam Gimbel (great-grandfather); Sally Phipps (step-mother)

Edward "Ted" Nathanson (1925 – June 6, 1997) was an American television director.

== Biography ==
Born Benedict Gimbel III to a Jewish family in Philadelphia, the son of Ethel S. (née Nathanson) and Benedict Gimbel Jr. and the great-grandson of Adam Gimbel of the Gimbel Brothers retailing family. His father was the president and general manager of WIP, one of the first radio stations in Philadelphia. He changed his name to Edward Nathanson (the surname of his mother) after his parents divorced. (His father remarried in 1931 to actress Sally Phipps although they divorced in 1935). During World War II, he volunteered for the American Field Service as an ambulance driver in Europe for Field Marshal Bernard Montgomery's Eighth Army. After the war, he worked for CBS, ABC and then NBC where he directed the original Tonight Show and the Today Show.

He then became the coordinating producer of football and tennis for NBC Sports, where he directed 13 consecutive Super Bowls, 21 consecutive Wimbledon tennis championships, the 1972 Winter Olympics, and the 1988 Summer Olympics. He also directed a wide variety of television shows including game shows, political conventions, and sporting events including major league baseball, boxing, college football, hockey, and golf. He was one of the first to utilize hand-held and remote-controlled cameras. He remained at NBC for 37 years.

He was the first person to receive the Directors Guild of America Lifetime Achievement Award for sports-related broadcasting.

== Personal life ==
He died on June 6, 1997, in Manhattan of lung cancer. He was survived by his wife, Edith (née Landesman), a producer he met while working at ABC; and three children, Michael Nathanson, Laura Nathanson Knobloch, and Carla Nathanson Hoffman. All three of his children worked in the industry: Laura retired as Senior Vice President at ABC Television; Carla with the David Letterman Show; and Michael as president of MGM Pictures. His wife died in 2020.
