= Nathanson =

Nathanson is a surname. It may refer to:

- Bernard Nathanson (1926–2011), American physician
- E. M. Nathanson (1928–2016), American writer
- Jacob P. Nathanson (1901–1986), New York politician
- Jeff Nathanson (born 1965), American screenwriter
- Julius Nathanson (1890–1957), American actor and comedian
- Jill Nathanson (born 1955), American painter
- Marcus Nathanson (1793–1868), Jewish scholar
- Matt Nathanson (born 1973), American singer and songwriter
- Melvyn B. Nathanson (born 1944), American mathematician
- Michael Nathanson (actor), American actor
- Michael Nathanson (director), Canadian playwright and theatre director
- Michael Nathanson (film executive), American film industry executive
- Rikki Nathanson (born c. 1956), Zimbabwean transgender activist
- Ted Nathanson (1925–1997), American television director

== See also ==
- Natanson
- Nathansen
