= Kotte =

Kotte may refer to:

- Kotte (surname), a German surname
- Sri Jayawardenepura Kotte, the legislative capital city of Sri Lanka
- Kingdom of Kotte, the kingdom
- Kotte Rural LLG, the local-level government in Papua New Guinea

== See also ==
- Cotte
- Kote (disambiguation)
