= Cottler =

Cottler is a surname. Notable people with the surname include:

- Irving Cottler (1918–1989), an American drummer
- Elaine Showalter (born Elaine Cottler in 1941), American literary critic, feminist, and writer

== See also ==
- Kottler (disambiguation)
- Cotler
- Cotter (disambiguation)
