= Nathansen =

Nathansen is a Danish patronymic surname literally meaning "son of Nathan".

- Fritze Nathansen
- Henri Nathansen
- Johan L. Nathansen

== See also ==
- Nathanson
