= Cotler =

Cotler is a surname. Notable people with the surname include:

- Irwin Cotler (born 1940), Member of the Canadian Parliament for Mount Royal
- Doug Cotler (born 1949), American singer-songwriting and composer
- Kami Cotler (born 1965), American actress and educator
- Julia Quinn, the pseudonym of Julie Pottinger (born Julie Cotler in 1970), an American writer
- Loire Cotler, American Jazz Rhythm Vocalist (born Lori Beth Cotler in 1972)
- Zachary Cotler (born 1981), American film director and poet

== See also ==
- Kotler
- Cottler
