= Kottler =

Kottler is a surname. Notable people with the surname include:

- Friedrich Kottler (1886–1965), Austrian theoretical physicist
- Moses Kottler (1896–1977), South African painter and sculptor
- Martin Kottler (1910–1989), American football running back
- Howard Kottler (1930–1989), American ceramist, conceptual artist, and professor of ceramics

== Other uses ==
- 10416 Kottler, an asteroid named after Herbert Kottler

== See also ==
- Kotler
- Kotter (disambiguation)
- Cottler
