= Love Makes 'Em Wild =

1927 film directed by Albert Ray

- Directed by: Albert Ray
- Screenplay by: Harold Shumate
- Based on: Willie the Worm by Florence Ryerson
- Starring: John Harron; Sally Phipps; Ben Bard; Arthur Housman; J. Farrell MacDonald; Natalie Kingston
- Cinematography: Chester A. Lyons
- Production company: Fox Film Corporation
- Distributed by: Fox Film Corporation
- Release date: March 6, 1927
- Running time: 60 minutes
- Country: United States
- Language: English

Love Makes 'Em Wild is a 1927 American silent comedy film directed by Albert Ray and written by Harold Shumate. The film stars John Harron, Sally Phipps, Ben Bard, Arthur Housman, J. Farrell MacDonald and Natalie Kingston. The film was released on March 6, 1927, by Fox Film Corporation.

== Cast ==
- John Harron as Willie Angle
- Sally Phipps as Mary O'Shane
- Ben Bard as Blankenship
- Arthur Housman as Charlie Austin
- J. Farrell MacDonald as W. Barden
- Natalie Kingston as Mamie
- Albert Gran as Green
- Florence Gilbert as Lulu
- Earl Mohan as Sam
- Coy Watson Jr. as Jimmy
- Noah Young as Janitor
- William B. Davidson as Mamie's Ex-husband

== Preservation ==
With no holdings located in archives, Love Makes 'Em Wild is considered a lost film.
