= Bertha, the Sewing Machine Girl =

1926 film

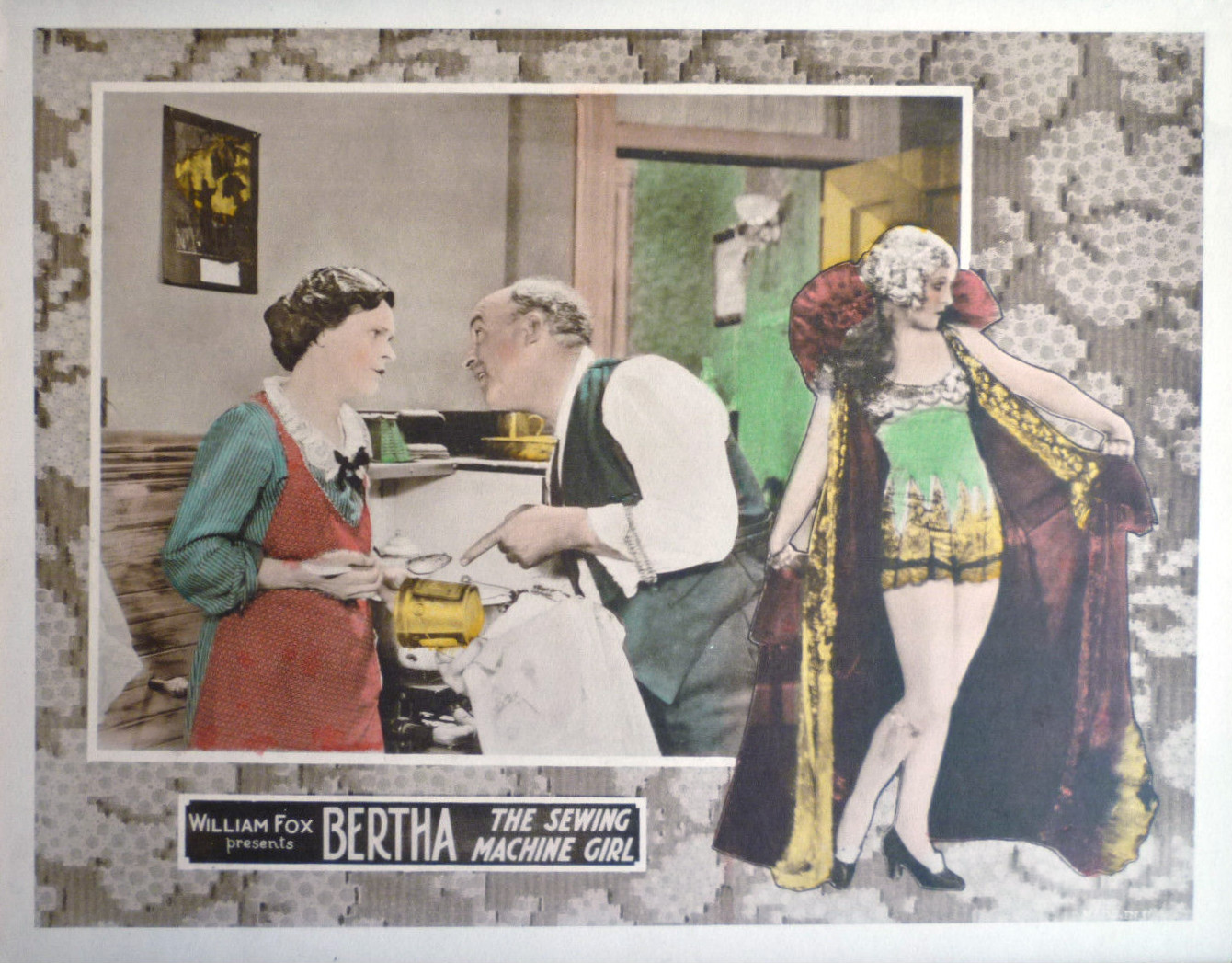
- Lobby card
- Directed by: Irving Cummings
- Screenplay by: Gertrude Orr
- Based on: Bertha, the Sewing Machine Girl by Theodore Kremer
- Starring: Madge Bellamy; Allan Simpson; Sally Phipps; Paul Nicholson; Anita Garvin; J. Farrell MacDonald
- Cinematography: Conrad Wells
- Production company: Fox Film Corporation
- Distributed by: Fox Film Corporation
- Release date: December 19, 1926
- Running time: 60 minutes
- Country: United States
- Languages: Silent; English intertitles

Bertha, the Sewing Machine Girl is a 1926 American drama film directed by Irving Cummings and written by Gertrude Orr. It is based on the 1906 play Bertha, the Sewing Machine Girl by Theodore Kremer. The film stars Madge Bellamy, Allan Simpson, Sally Phipps, Paul Nicholson, Anita Garvin and J. Farrell MacDonald. The film was released on December 19, 1926, by Fox Film Corporation.

== Cast ==
- Madge Bellamy as Bertha Sloan
- Allan Simpson as Roy Davis
- Sally Phipps as Jessie
- Paul Nicholson as Jules Morton
- Anita Garvin as Flo Mason
- J. Farrell MacDonald as Sloan
- Ethel Wales as Mrs. Sloan
- Arthur Housman as Salesman
- Harry A. Bailey as Sam Ginsberg
