= Cotter pin =

Cotter pin may refer to:

In U.S. usage:

- Split pin, a metal fastener with two tines that are bent during installation used to fasten metal together, like with a staple or rivet
- Hairpin cotter pin, more commonly known as an "R-clip"
- Circle cotter, a ring-shaped cotter pin

In British usage:

- Cotter (pin), in mechanical engineering a pin or wedge passing through a hole to fix parts tightly together
