= Robert Kotler =

American plastic surgeon (born 1942)

Robert Kotler, M.D. FACS, born in 1942, is an American ear, nose, and throat surgeon. He has performed more than 10,000 major cosmetic procedures, with over 40 years in private practice, and was a featured surgeon in the first season of the E! cosmetic surgery series Dr. 90210.

== Biography ==
Robert Kotler, MD, clinical instructor, head and neck surgery, UCLA Medical Center, attending surgeon and consultant, Veterans Hospital West Los Angeles, 52 medical publications and presentations. Contributor to 14 medical textbooks and books on cosmetic and plastic surgery for the public. Author of Secrets of a Beverly Hills Cosmetic Surgeon, the Experts Guide to Safe, Successful Surgery. The Essential Cosmetic Surgery Companion, Don’t Consult a Cosmetic Surgeon without this book. Chemical Rejuvenation of Face, the medical textbook regarded worldwide as “The Bible” for MDs performing nonsurgical wrinkle removal.

The developer of the Kotler Saline Demo to give patients a temporary “test drive” or “sneak preview” of his technique of micro-droplet, permanent nonsurgical rhinoplasty and permanent nonsurgical revision rhinoplasty. The results are instantaneously seen in the mirror. Inventor of the Reltok Clear-Flo(trademark) Nasal Airway, an FDA cleared, patented medical device providing clear breathing after any nasal or sinus surgery.

== Professional Positions Held ==
- Undergraduate, University of Wisconsin – Madison.
- Graduate, Senior Class President, Northwestern University Medical School.
- Specialty Residency, Northwestern University, University of Illinois.
- Specialty Board Certification.
- Diplomate American Board of Otolaryngology/Head and Neck Surgery.
- Diplomate American Board of Cosmetic Surgery.
- Subspecial Fellowship in Facial Cosmetic Surgery, Moray Parks MD preceptor.
- Former Consultant and Residency Program Instructor.
- Former Major, Medical CORPS US Army.
- Consultant and Residency Program Instructor, United States Army Hospital, Fort Belvord, Virginia.
- Chief Head and Neck Surgery, DeWitt Army Hospital.
- Founder and CEO, Reltok Nasal Products, LLC.
- Inventor of RELTOK Clear-Flo nasal splint.
- Former Commissioner and Regional Consultant, Medical Board of California.
- Former Consultant City of Los Angeles and County of Los Angeles.

== Published books ==
- The Consumer's Guidebook to Cosmetic Facial Surgery (Ernest Mitchell, 1990)
- Chemical Rejuvenation of the Face (Mosby Year Book, 1992)
- Secrets of a Beverly Hills Cosmetic Surgeon (Ernest Mitchell, 2003)
- The Essential Cosmetic Surgery Companion (Ernest Mitchell, 2005)

== Selected articles ==
- Alonso-Zaldivar, Ricardo. "Cosmetic surgery business sags as purse strings tighten." Los Angeles Times. 5 April 2008. Tribune Interactive, Inc.
- Rouen, Ethan. "Vacationing for New You." American Way Magazine. 15 February 2010.The Magazine of American Airlines.
- Robert Kotler, MD FACS. "Rhinoplasty Upscaled: What more can we do to improve the rate of successful outcomes? Plenty." Plastic Surgery Products. February 2011.<Allied Media, Inc.
- Smith, Rich. "Patient Satisfaction is Key." Plastic Surgery Times. January, 2009. Allied Media.
- Hilton, Lisette. "The Written Word. Cosmetic Surgery Books are an important part of patient education." Modern Medicine, 1 August 2006. Advanstar Communications, Inc.
- Springen, Karen. "Kids Under the Knife." Newsweek. 31 October 2004
- Kotler, Robert, MD FACS. "What You Should Know about Face-Lifts." Bottom Line Personal. 15 April 2004. Bottom Line Publications.
- Nash, Karen. "Rhinoplasty for teens offers functional, aesthetic satisfaction." Modern Medicine. 1 September 2001. Advanstar Communications, Inc.
- Lawrence S. Moy, M.D.; Robert Kotler, M.D. "The Histologic Evaluation of Pulsed Carbon Dioxide Laser Resurfacing versus Phenol Chemical Peels in Vivo." Dermatologic Surgery, 25(8):597–600. August, 1999.
