= McCotter =

McCotter is a surname. Notable people with the surname include:

- Brian McCotter (born 1984), Irish basketball player
- Jim McCotter (born 1945), American businessman
- Lane McCotter, American federal police officer
- Thaddeus McCotter (born 1965), American politician
