= Natanson =

Natanson is a surname. It may refer to:

- Isidor Natanson (1906–1964), Swiss-born Soviet mathematician
- Jacques Natanson (1901–1975), French playwright and screenwriter
- Jakub Natanson (1832-1884), Polish chemist and banker
- Mark Natanson (1850 [N.S. 1851]–1919), Russian-Jewish revolutionary
- Vladimir Natanson (1909–1993), Russian pianist, music educator, and musicologist
- Władysław Natanson (1864–1937), Polish physicist

== See also ==
- Nathanson
- Natanzon
