= Shlomo Nosson Kotler =

American rabbi and scholar

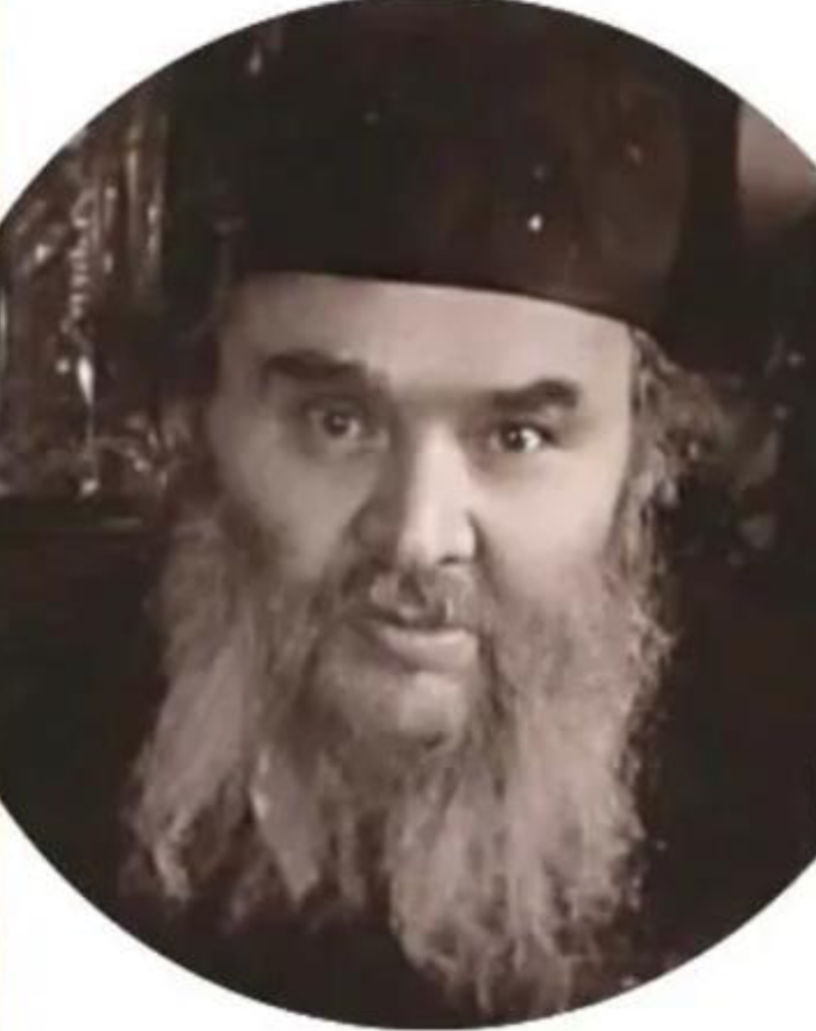

Shlomo Nosson Kotler (Hebrew: שלמה קוטלר; 1856 – c. 1920) was an Orthodox rabbi and rosh yeshiva (dean), Talmudic scholar, Torah author and posek (halakhic decisor).

== Early life ==
Born in Kovno, Lithuania, Kotler studied in the Telz yeshiva under Eliezer Gordon and Jacob Joseph. He later studied in the yeshiva of Yaakov Charif, who became his rebbe (foremost teacher). He received semikhah (rabbinical ordination) from many great rabbis, among them Yitzchak Elchanan Spektor. Having already served as a Talmudic lecturer in the Łomża yeshiva at the age of twenty, he became one of the first teachers in the Knesses Yisroel yeshiva in Slobodke. A few years later, he accepted the position of Av Beth Din in the city of Uzhvent, near Kovno.

== Career ==
In 1893, Kotler's ailing former teacher Joseph, then the chief rabbi of New York City, invited him to serve as his associate. Kotler served as rabbi of Congregation Tiferes Jerusalem in New York in Joseph's stead for the next three years. In 1896, he joined the newly founded Rabbi Isaac Elchanan Theological Seminary (RIETS) as a rosh yeshiva (dean).

Unsatisfied with the weak Orthodox Jewish life and practice in the United States, Kotler returned to Europe to serve as rabbi in the cities of Kurshan and Luknik. Before World War 1, Kotler returned to the United States, settling for seven years in Detroit.

== Personal life and death ==
Towards the end of his life, Kotler emigrated to Palestine, where his daughter lived. Following Kotler's death, his son-in-law Yaakov Moshe Charlap renamed his Jerusalem yeshiva in his memory. His great-grandson Zevulun Charlop was the dean of RIETS many decades later.

== Works ==
Kotler authored numerous Torah articles which were published in the various Torah journals of his day, as well as many sefarim (books), including the two-volumed responsa Kerem Shlomo (Jerusalem, 1936) and the original work Beis Shlomo (St. Louis, 1927). Many of Kotler's unpublished Torah manuscripts and insights have been lost.
