= Kotte (surname) =

Kotte is a German surname. Notable people of the surname include the following:

- Arne Kotte (1935–2015), Norwegian football player
- Karen Kotte (died 1590), Danish businesswoman
- Peter Kotte (1954), German footballer
