= Adam Gimbel =

American businessman (1817–1896)

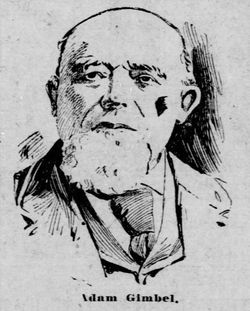
- Gimbel c. 1890
- Born: May 15, 1817; Palatinate, Bavaria
- Died: June 28, 1896 (aged 79); Philadelphia, Pennsylvania, US
- Occupation: Merchant
- Spouse: Fridolyn Kahn-Weiler (m. 1847; died 1886)
- Children: 14
- Family: Benedict Gimbel Jr. (grandson); Bernard Gimbel (grandson); Richard Gimbel (grandson)

Adam Gimbel (May 16, 1817 – June 28, 1896) was an American businessman and the founder of the Gimbel Brothers Company.

== Biography ==
Gimbel was born to a Jewish family in the Palatinate, then a part of Bavaria, in 1817 where he worked in the local baron's vineyard. In May 1835, he immigrated to the United States paying his fare by working as a ship's hand. Arriving in New Orleans, he worked two years as a dock worker. Noticing the itinerant peddlers who moved up and down the river peddling their goods, he saved his earnings and purchased an inventory of needles, thread, and cloth and headed north in July 1837. He printed listings of his goods and nailed them to trees along his route. After five years, he was able to purchase a horse and carriage and increase the variety of goods he carried.

In 1842, he arrived at Vincennes, Indiana near where the Wabash River joined the Ohio River. It was a bustling town, and he sold out his entire inventory in one week. Gimbel decided to stay in town and at first rented a room from a local dentist and then purchased a house for his retail store, naming it the "Palace of Trade". The store sold all kinds of goods including nails, gunpowder, harnesses, shawls, shoes, cloth, and pelts, and did not negotiate prices, the common practice at the time. Native Americans were particularly attracted to the standardized prices as they were often charged higher prices when negotiating. Gimbel used the motto "Fairness and Equality to All Patrons." In 1869, he opened a store in Danville, Illinois.

In 1887, Gimbel sold his store in Vincennes and moved to Milwaukee, where a large German population lived, upon the surveillance and recommendation of his son Jacob. They purchased a four-story store at the corner of Wisconsin and Grand from local merchant John Plankinton. The Gimbels store was the largest dry goods vendor in the city, with its own elevator and 40–75 salespeople.

In 1894, the Gimbel Brothers Company, as it was then known, expanded to Philadelphia, buying a dry goods store, the Granville Haines store (originally built and operated by Cooper and Conard). Gimbel believed that the manufacturer should sell direct to the retailer to keep prices low and cut out the middleman; in Philadelphia, he opened his own manufacturing facility.

== Personal life ==
In 1847, he married Fridolyn Kahn-Weiler; they had fourteen children, eleven of whom lived to adulthood. His seven sons, Jacob, Ellis, Isaac, Charles, Louis, Daniel, and Benedict, all worked in the family business. Every family business meeting was opened by a reading from the Book of Proverbs. Gimbel died on June 28, 1896. He is buried in Mt. Sinai Cemetery in Philadelphia.
