= Gimbels =

American department store chain

Gimbel Brothers
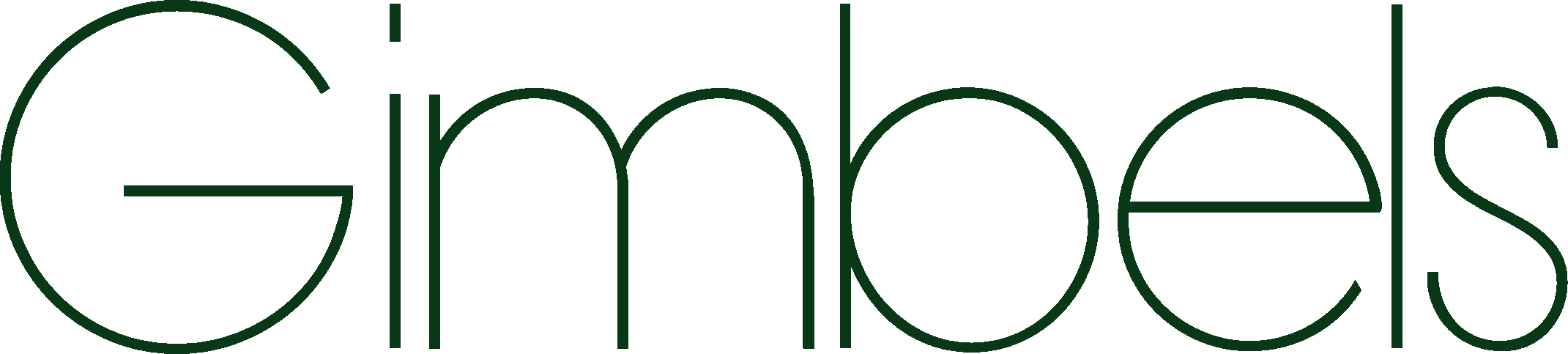

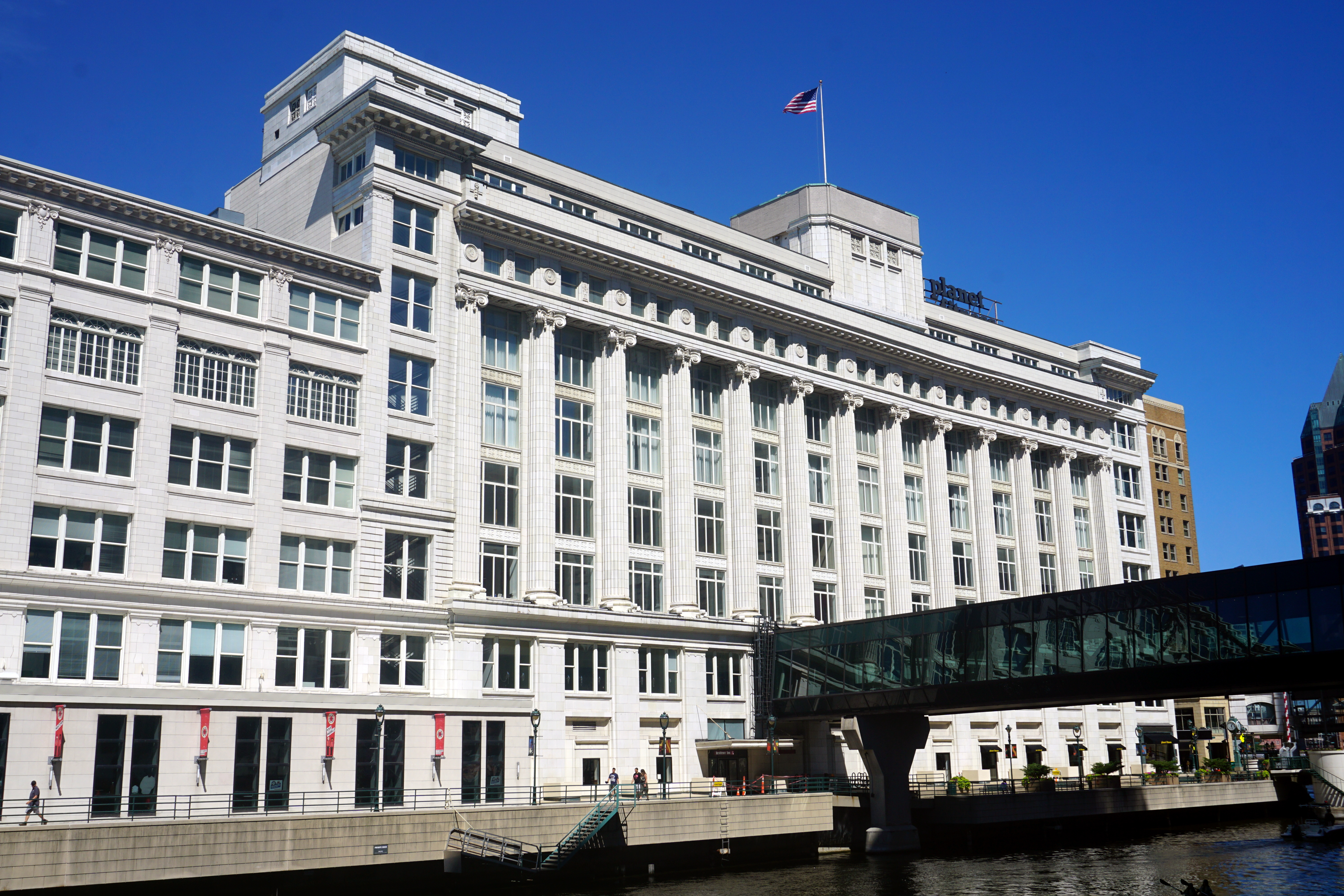
- Exterior of the former Gimbels flagship store in Milwaukee (2022)
- Trade name: Gimbels
- Type: Subsidiary
- Industry: Retail
- Genre: Department stores
- Founded: 1842; 184 years ago in Vincennes, Indiana, United States
- Founder: Adam Gimbel
- Defunct: 1987; 39 years ago
- Fate: Liquidation
- Headquarters: New York City, New York, United States
- Number of locations: 53 (at peak, 1965); 35 (at closing, 1987)
- Areas served: Connecticut; New Jersey; New York; Pennsylvania; Maryland; Delaware; Wisconsin
- Key people: Adam L. Gimbel; Bernard Gimbel
- Products: Clothing; footwear; bedding; furniture; jewelry; beauty products; housewares
- Parent: Brown & Williamson (1973–1980); Batus Inc. (1980–1987)
- Subsidiaries: Saks Fifth Avenue (1923–1973)

Gimbel Brothers, commonly known as Gimbels, was an American department store corporation that operated from 1842 until 1987. The company was founded by Adam Gimbel who, in 1842, opened his first general store in Vincennes, Indiana. In 1887, the company moved its operations to Milwaukee, Wisconsin, establishing the first Gimbel Brothers Department Store. It became a chain in 1894 when it opened a second, larger location in Philadelphia, Pennsylvania, which also served as its headquarters for several years. At the urging of future company president Bernard Gimbel, grandson of the founder, the company expanded to New York City in 1910.

Gimbels established the nation's first department store Thanksgiving parade, the Gimbels Thanksgiving Day Parade, which debuted in Philadelphia in 1920. The company was also a chief rival of Macy's with their feud popularized in American culture. By 1930, Gimbels operated 20 locations and was the largest department store chain in the world by sales revenue. The company expanded to a peak of 53 stores by 1965. In 1973, Gimbels was acquired by Brown & Williamson, which later formed the BATUS retail group to manage its retail holdings. BATUS eventually decided to dissolve the Gimbels brand and, in 1987, closed the remaining 35 locations in Pennsylvania, New York, New Jersey, Maryland, Delaware, Wisconsin, and Connecticut.

== History ==
=== Early history ===
The company was founded by a young Bavarian Jewish immigrant, Adam Gimbel, who opened a general store in Vincennes, Indiana. After a brief stay in Danville, Illinois, Gimbel relocated in 1887 to Milwaukee, Wisconsin, which was then a boomtown heavily populated by German immigrants. The new store quickly became the leading department store there. However, with seven sons, Adam Gimbel saw the opportunity to expand elsewhere.

In 1894, Gimbels—then led by the founder's son, Isaac Gimbel—acquired the Granville Haines store (originally built and operated by Cooper and Conard) in Philadelphia, Pennsylvania, and in 1910, opened another branch in New York City. With its arrival in New York, Gimbels prospered, and soon became the primary rival to the leading Herald Square retailer, Macy's, whose flagship store was located a block north. This rivalry entered into the American popular vernacular as "Does Macy's tell Gimbels?", an idiom used to brush off any query about matters the speaker didn't wish to divulge. To distinguish itself from Herald Square neighbors, Gimbels' advertising promised more: "Select, don't settle."

Gimbels became so successful that in 1922 the chain went public, offering shares on the New York Stock Exchange (though the family retained a controlling interest). The stock sales provided capital for expansion, starting with the 1923 purchase of across-the-street rival Saks & Co., which operated under the name Saks-34th Street; with ownership of Saks, Gimbel created an uptown branch called Saks Fifth Avenue. Moving into radio, Gimbels purchased WGBS in New York and WIP in Philadelphia. In 1925, Gimbels entered the Pittsburgh market with the purchase of Kaufmann & Baer's, acquiring WCAE in the deal. Although expansion spurred talk of the stores becoming a nationwide chain, the Great Depression ended that prospect. Gimbel did increase the number of more upscale (and enormously profitable) Saks Fifth Avenue stores in the 1930s, opening branches in Chicago, Boston and San Francisco.

=== Success ===
By 1930, Gimbels had seven flagship stores throughout the country and sales of $123 million ($2.4 billion today) across 20 stores; this made Gimbel Brothers Inc. the largest department store corporation in the world. By 1953, sales had risen to $300 million ($3.6 billion today). In 1962, Gimbels acquired Milwaukee competitor Schuster's, and in that region operated stores from both chains for a while as Gimbels Schuster's. By 1965, Gimbel Brothers Inc. consisted of 53 stores throughout the country, which included 22 Gimbels, 27 Saks Fifth Avenue stores, and four Saks 34th St.

==== Gimbels and the middle class ====
Gimbels' principles and merchandise sought to reflect the ideals of middle class America. Their principles consisted of "courtesy, reliability, good value, and enlightened management". By using middle-class values Gimbels attracted shoppers to a store that also could fit their budgets. Keeping the store plain and less extravagant than some of its competitors, Gimbels used the slogan "the customer pays for fancy frills." Gimbels was about the product, not the aesthetics. By offering a wide range of cutting-edge technology in its merchandise, Gimbels reflected the ideals held by the middle class of staying up to date with technologies and carrying new appliances and merchandise at an affordable price.

==== Merchandise ====
Gimbels Department Store offered a variety of merchandise and products, including home appliances, outdoor equipment, furniture, clothing, and much more. With multiple floors in its flagship stores, each floor offered a given category of merchandise. The Philadelphia Gimbels specifically offered fine jewelry, men's clothing, women's clothing, children's clothing, furniture, toys, art supplies, and appliances for the house. This store also contained The Gimbel Auditorium, Television Headquarters, a salon, and music center. With a wide variety of options Gimbels was a one-stop shop that made shopping easy and accessible.

==== Publicity ====
Despite its limited presence, Gimbels was well-known nationwide, in part because of the carefully cultivated rivalry with Macy's, but also thanks to an endless stream of publicity. The New York store received considerable attention as the site of the 1939–1940 sale of art and antiquities from the William Randolph Hearst collection. Gimbels also gained publicity through appearances in the 1947 film Miracle on 34th Street and the 1967 film Fitzwilly; it also made an appearance in the 2003 film Elf, long after the chain had ceased to exist. Gimbels was also frequently mentioned as a shopping destination of Lucy Ricardo and Ethel Mertz on the hit 1950s TV series I Love Lucy.

The Slinky made its debut at the northeast Philadelphia Gimbels store. The Philadelphia Gimbels was also the first department store in the world to move customers from floor to floor via the escalator.

==== Gimbels Thanksgiving Day Parade ====
The idea of a department-store parade originated in 1920 with Gimbels Department Store in Philadelphia with the parade now known as the 6abc Dunkin' Donuts Thanksgiving Day Parade. The Gimbel family saw the parade as a way to promote holiday shopping at its various store locations. Macy's did not start a parade until 1924. When Gimbels ceased operating in 1986, television station WPVI assumed responsibility for the parade, with sponsorship by Reading, Pennsylvania–based Boscov's. Currently, Dunkin' Donuts is the chief sponsor of the parade.

=== Acquisition and closure ===
Brown & Williamson, the American subsidiary of British American Tobacco, a diversified conglomerate based in Louisville, Kentucky, acquired Gimbels in 1973. Brown & Williamson also owned Marshall Field's (purchased in 1982), Frederick & Nelson, The Crescent stores, and Kohl's (purchased in 1972). Brown & Williamson later created the BATUS Retail Group as a subsidiary company for its retail holdings.

BATUS initially left the Gimbels chain in the four autonomous divisions that had been established under Gimbel family ownership: Gimbels New York, Gimbels Philadelphia, Gimbels Pittsburgh, and Gimbels Milwaukee. Each division operated independently of each other in advertising and buying. Each division offered their own charge card which could only be used at Gimbels stores in the same division. In 1983, the 10 stores of Gimbels New York and the 10 stores of Gimbels Philadelphia were combined into a single division, Gimbels East, in an attempt to reduce corporate overhead. Gimbels Pittsburgh and Gimbels Midwest remained separate divisions.

Deciding that Gimbels was a marginal performer with little potential for increased profitability, BATUS in 1986 decided to close its Gimbels division and sell its store properties. Some of the more attractive branches were taken over by Stern's (Allied Stores), Pomeroy's (Allied Stores), Kaufmann's (May Department Stores), or Boston Store. The cornerstone of the chain, the downtown Milwaukee store where Adam Gimbel had first found success (and supposedly the most profitable Gimbel store), was handed to BATUS sister division Marshall Field's, but eventually closed in 1997.

== Store divisions ==
Gimbels flagship stores were located in New York City, Philadelphia, Pittsburgh, Milwaukee.

=== New York flagship store ===
The Gimbels New York City flagship store was located in the cluster of large department stores that surrounded Herald Square, in Midtown Manhattan. Designed by architect Daniel Burnham, the structure, which once offered 27 acres (110,000 m^{2}) of sales space, has since been modernized and entirely revamped. When this building opened, on September 29, 1910, a major selling point was its many doors leading to the Herald Square New York City Subway station. Due to such easy access, by the time Gimbels closed in 1986, this store had the highest rate of "shrinkage", or shoplifting losses, in the world. Doors also opened to a pedestrian passage under the south side of 33rd Street, connecting Penn Station to the 34th Street (New York City Subway) and 33rd Street (PATH) stations. This passageway was closed in the 1990s for security reasons during a period of high crime.

The structure was converted in 1989 to A&S Plaza, a mall named for its anchor department store, a midtown branch of Brooklyn's A&S. The store became a Stern's in 1995, and the mall was renamed Manhattan Mall. The anchor store closed in 2001 and the space was subdivided within the mall, while the upper levels were converted to offices. A new JCPenney anchor store opened in 2009, in the lower two levels. That anchor store closed in 2020 and by 2021 all stores in the mall had closed, and the building served only as office space.

The building that housed a Gimbels branch at 86th Street and Lexington Avenue remains, but has been converted to apartments.

=== Philadelphia flagship ===
The Philadelphia flagship opened in 1893 when the Gimbel brothers bought the bankrupt Haines and Company dry goods store at Ninth and Market Streets. The store gradually expanded eastward to Eighth Street. In 1927 an extension south to Chestnut Street was completed and the store now comprised an entire city block, making it for a time the largest department store in the world. In 1977 Gimbels moved to The Gallery mall across Market Street. The original buildings were demolished in 1979-1980 except for the 1927 addition which was converted to professional office spaces, primarily a data center and medical offices. The Gallery location closed in 1986.

=== Pittsburgh flagship ===
In Pittsburgh, Starrett & van Vleck designed Kaufmann & Baer Co. department store in 1914 at 339 Sixth Avenue. Gimbels purchased the chain in 1925 and the store became their Pittsburgh flagship. After Gimbels ceased operations in 1986, the building sat vacant for years, until it was redeveloped in 1992 with retail on the lower two levels, including the first Barnes & Noble to open in Pittsburgh. In 2002, another redevelopment changed the vacant upper nine floors of the building to offices, now known as the Heinz 57 Center. In 1997, it was added to the list of historic landmarks by the Pittsburgh History and Landmarks Foundation.

=== Relationship to Saks ===
Saks was founded by Horace Saks in New York City. In 1923, Gimbels purchased Saks, which became a subsidiary of Gimbel Brothers, Incorporated, a publicly traded company. Adam Long Gimbel, grandson of the founder of Gimbels, Adam Gimbel, turned Saks into a national brand. In 1973, Brown & Williamson, who later formed BATUS Inc., acquired Gimbel Bros. and the Saks Fifth Avenue brand. BATUS closed Gimbels in 1986, and subsequently sold Saks to Investcorp S.A. in 1990.

=== Historical Marker, Vincennes, Indiana ===
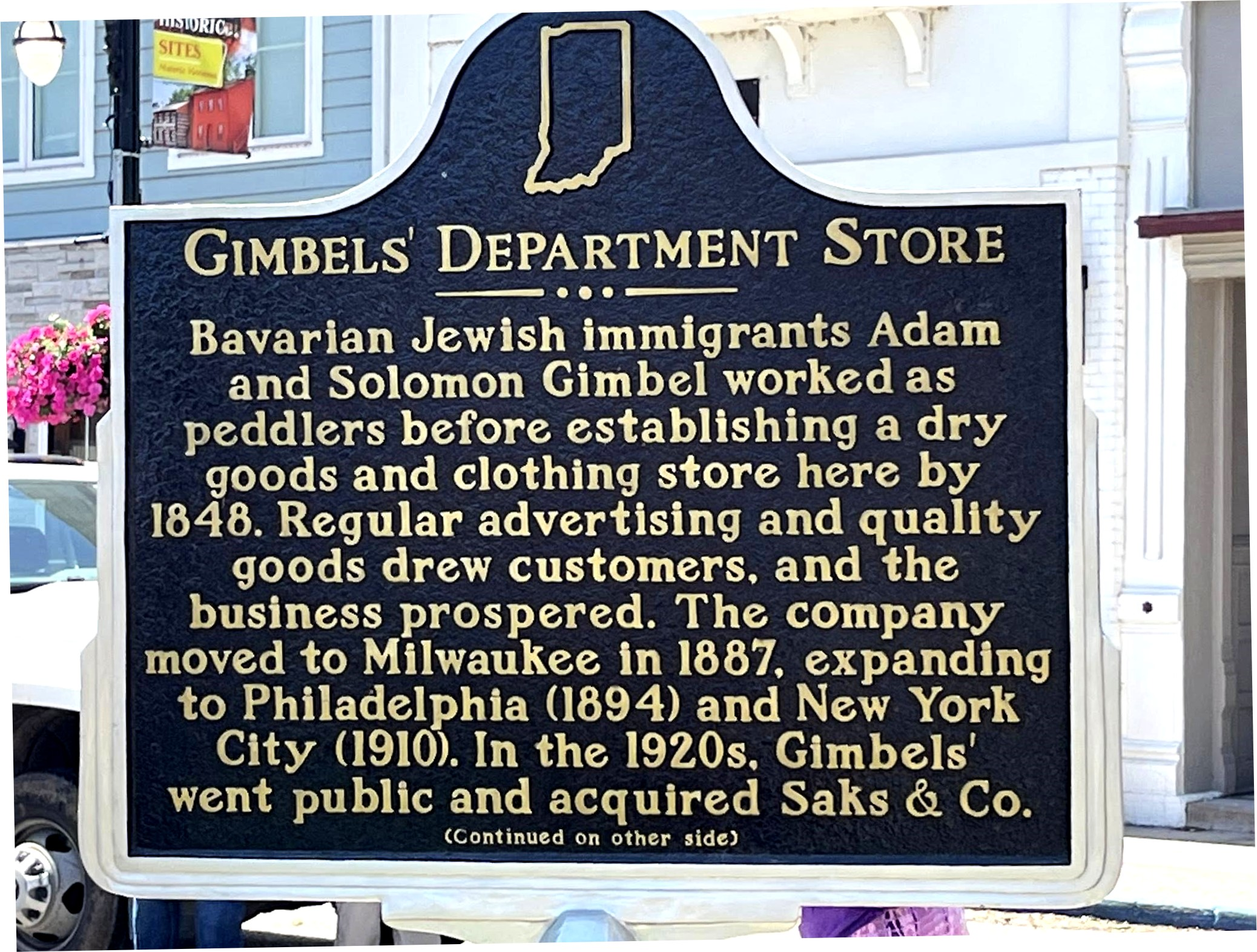
Gimbel's Department Store Historical Marker, Vincennes, Indiana - side one

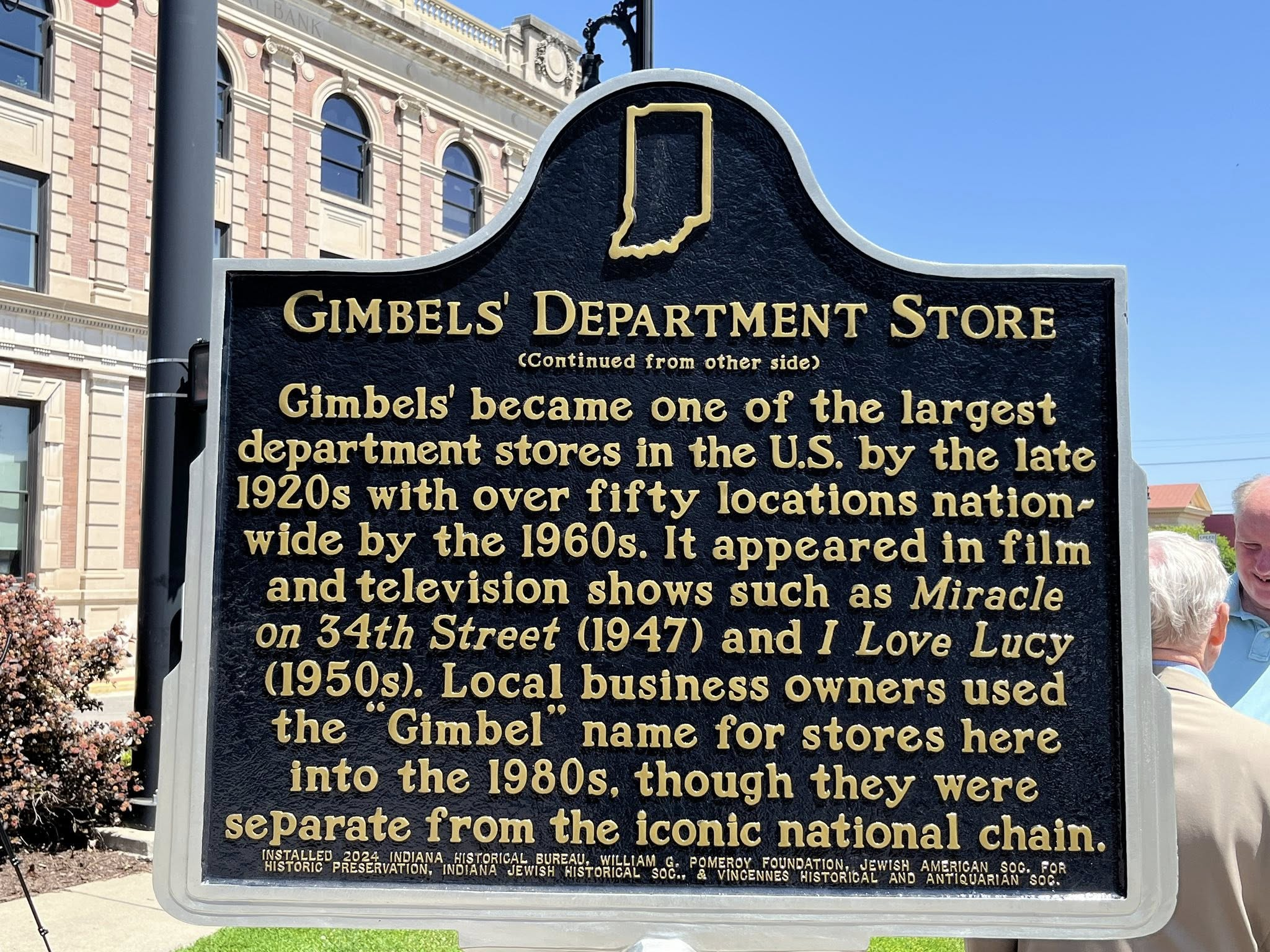
Gimbels' Department Store Historical Marker, Vincennes, Indiana - Side two

== Gallery ==
Gimbels

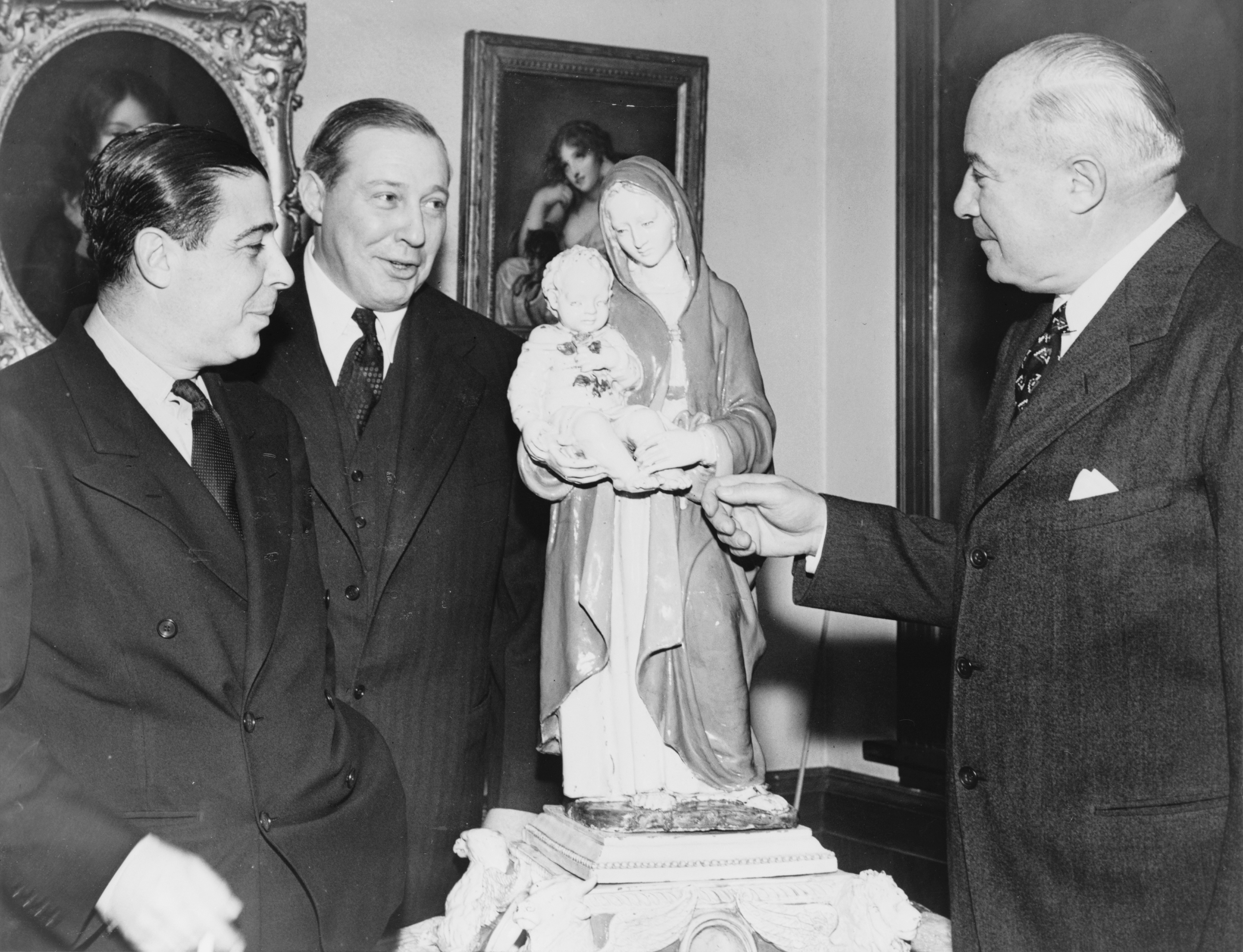
Adam, Frederic, and Bernard Gimbel

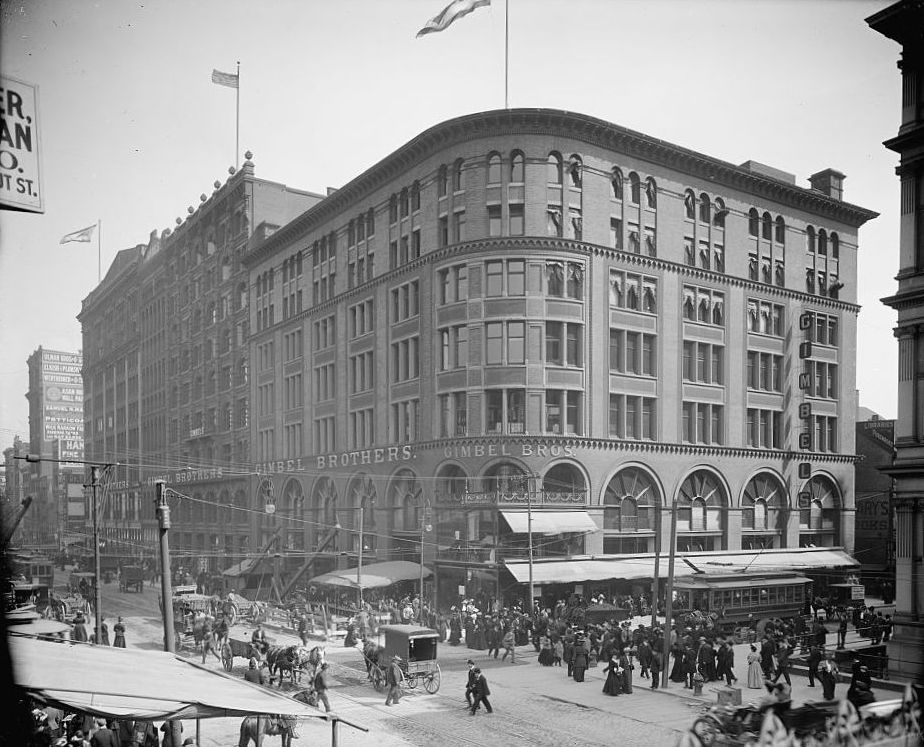
Philadelphia store, c.1910

Display advertisements announcing the 1910 opening of the New York flagship store

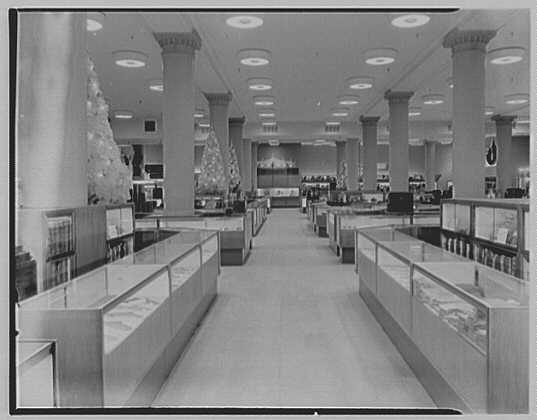
Interior of the New York Gimbels flagship store, 1950, following remodeling by designer Raymond Loewy

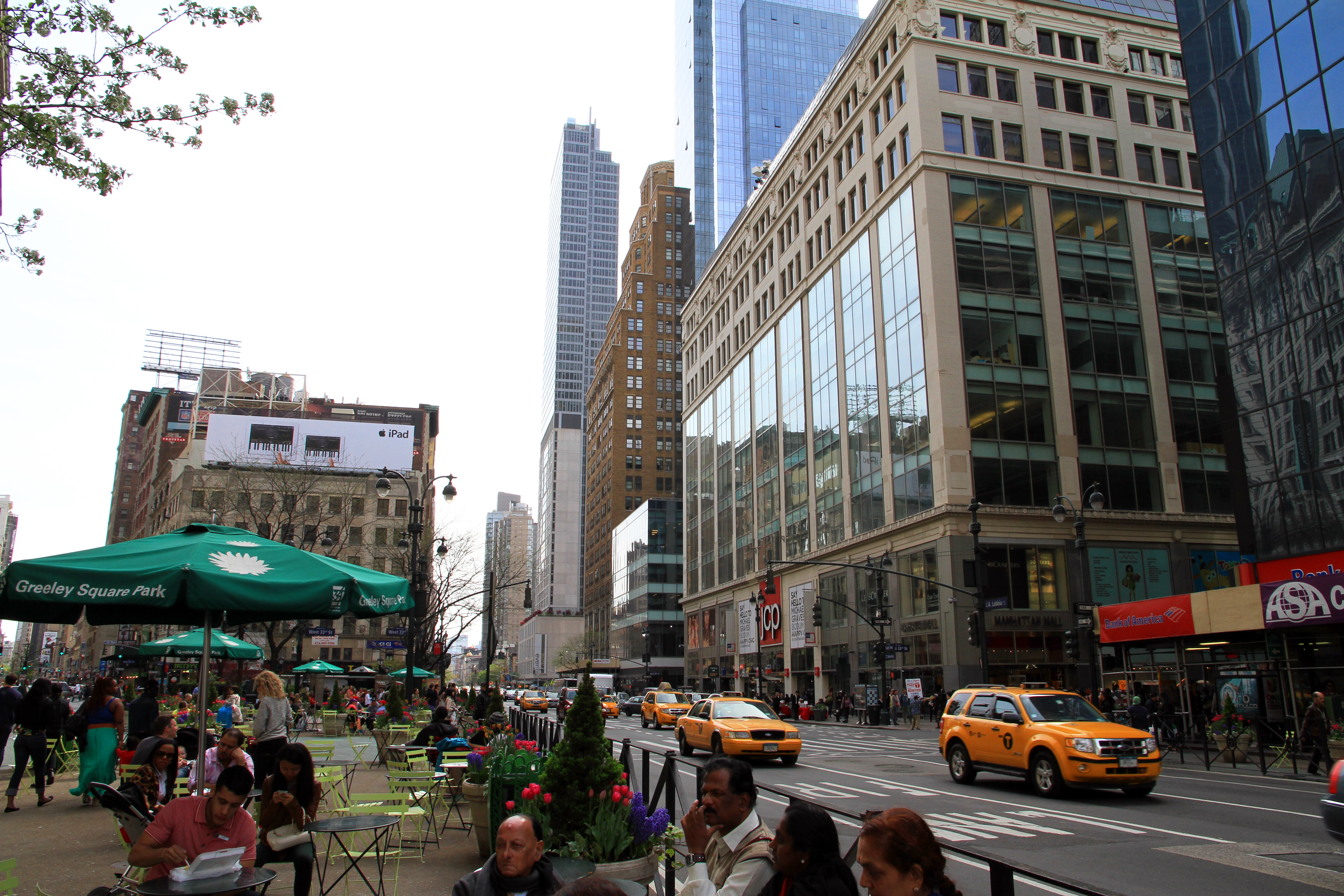
The New York flagship location, now 100 West 33rd Street, is on the right

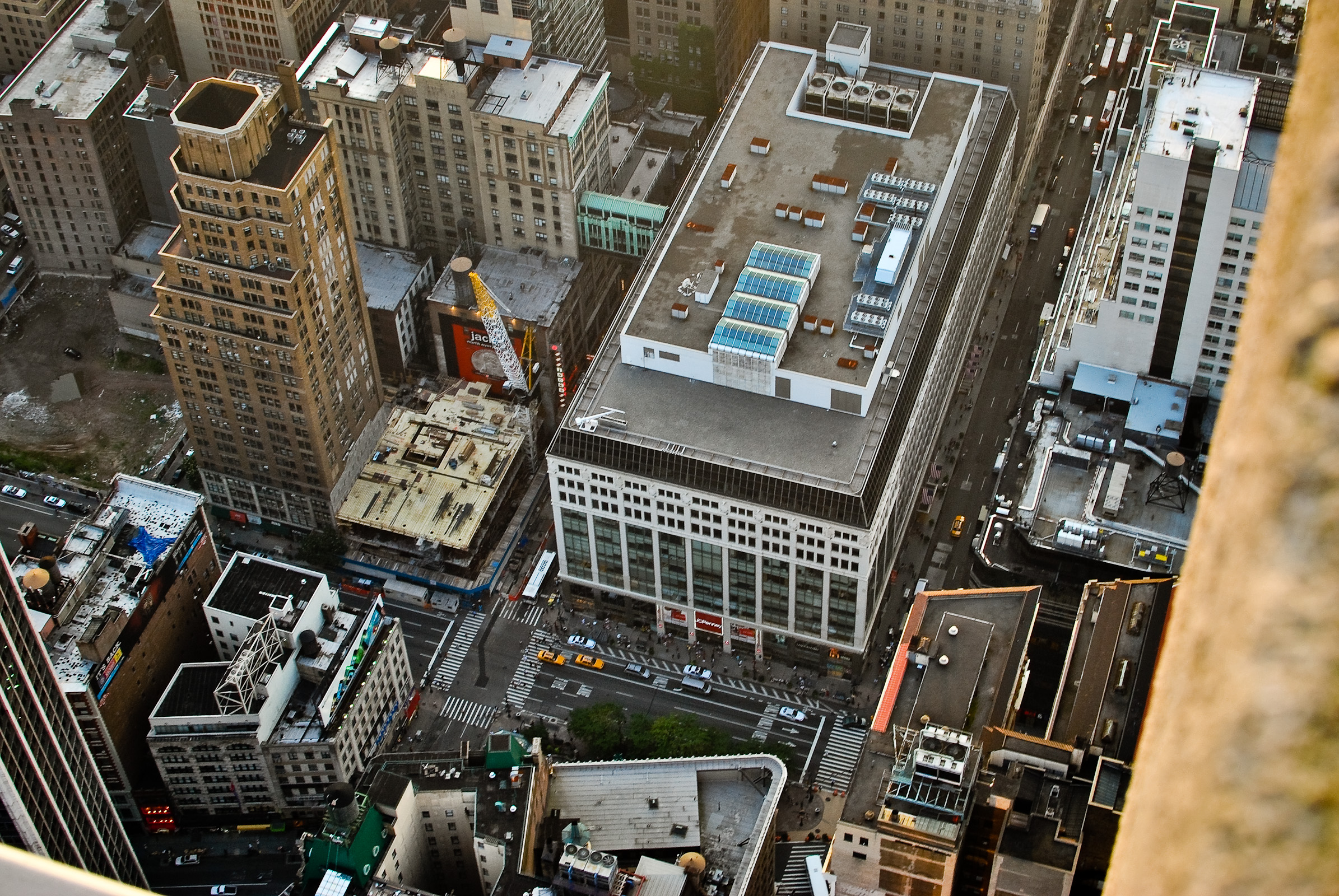
The New York flagship location, now Manhattan Mall, seen from the Empire State Building

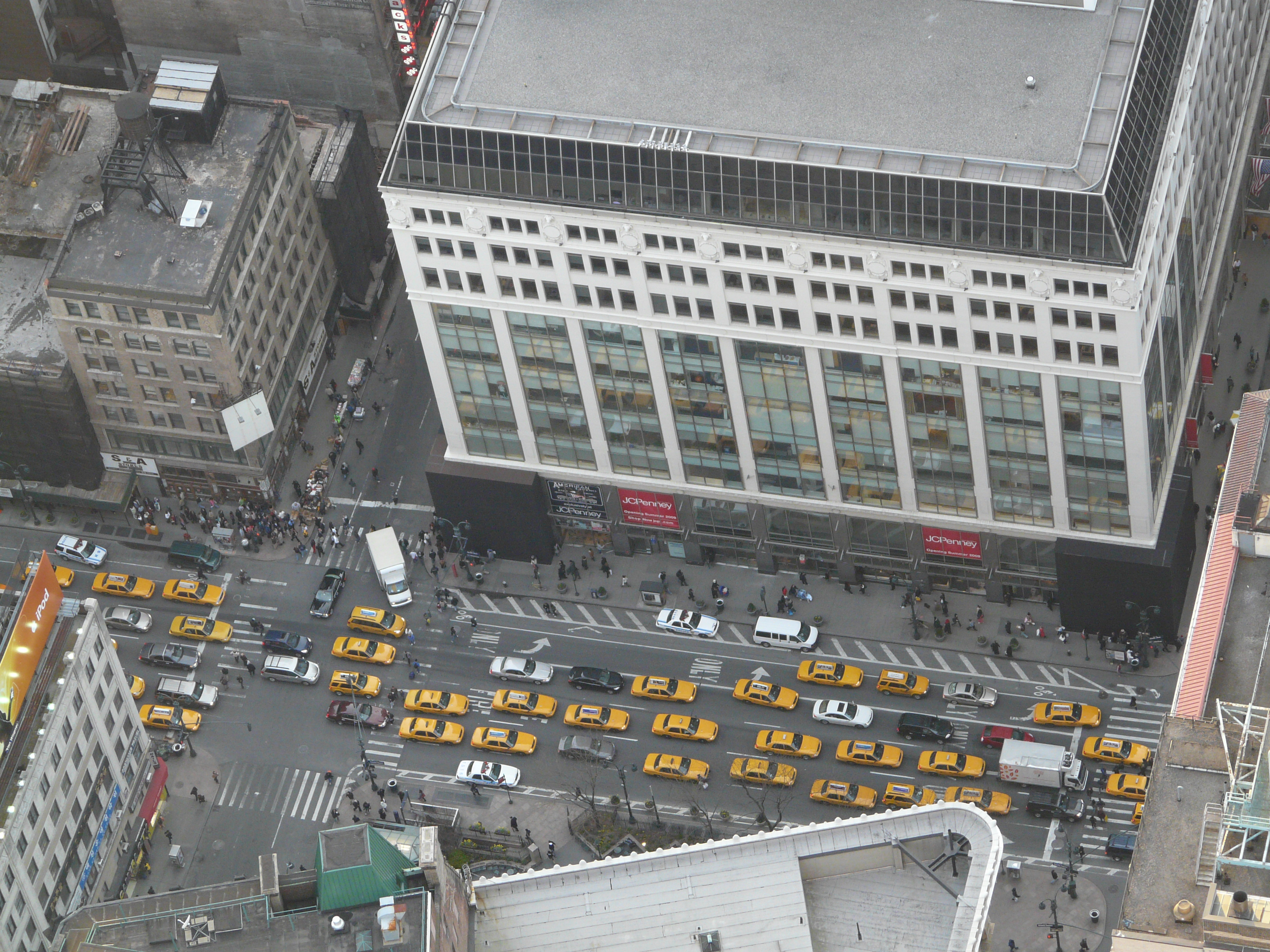
The New York flagship location in 2008

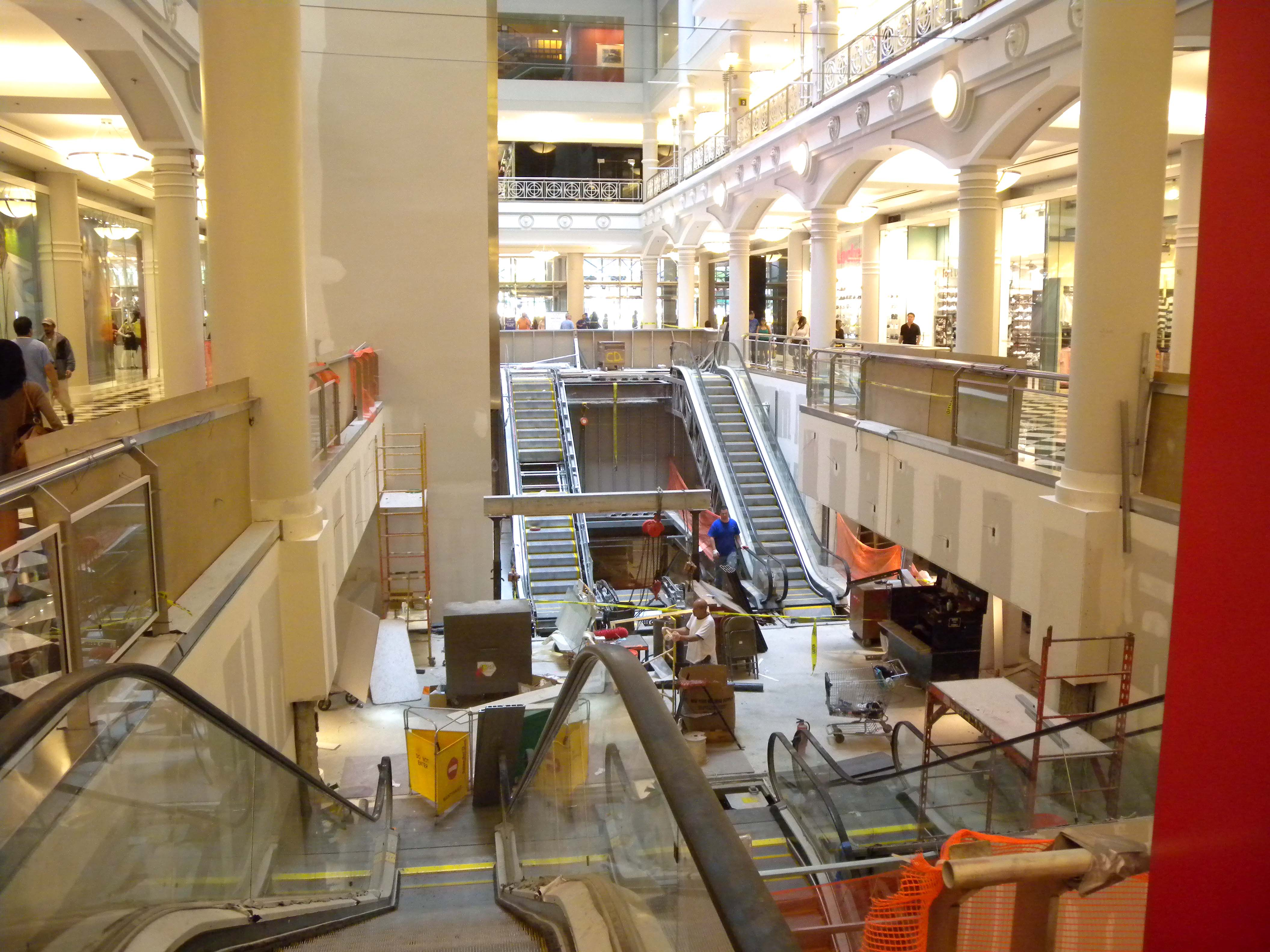
The Manhattan Mall now occupies the former Gimbels location in Midtown Manhattan

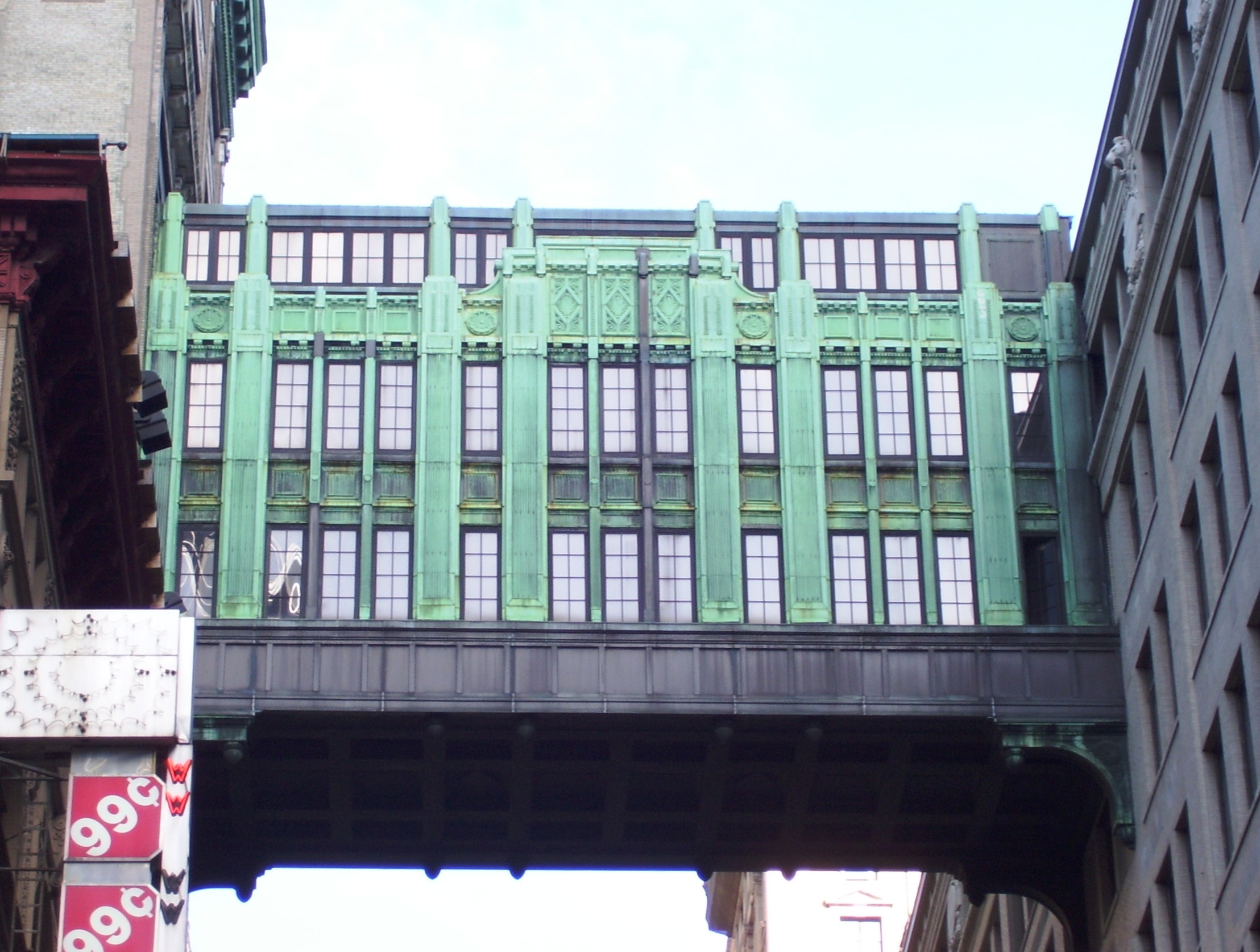
Historic Art Deco triple-deck skybridge over 32nd St that once connected the New York Gimbels flagship store with Saks-34th Street, also owned by the chain

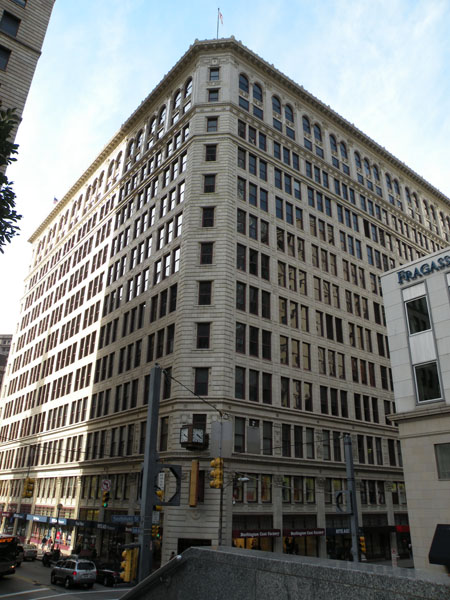
The Heinz 57 Center, formerly the Gimbel Brothers Department Store, built in 1914, located at 339 Sixth Avenue in Pittsburgh, Pennsylvania

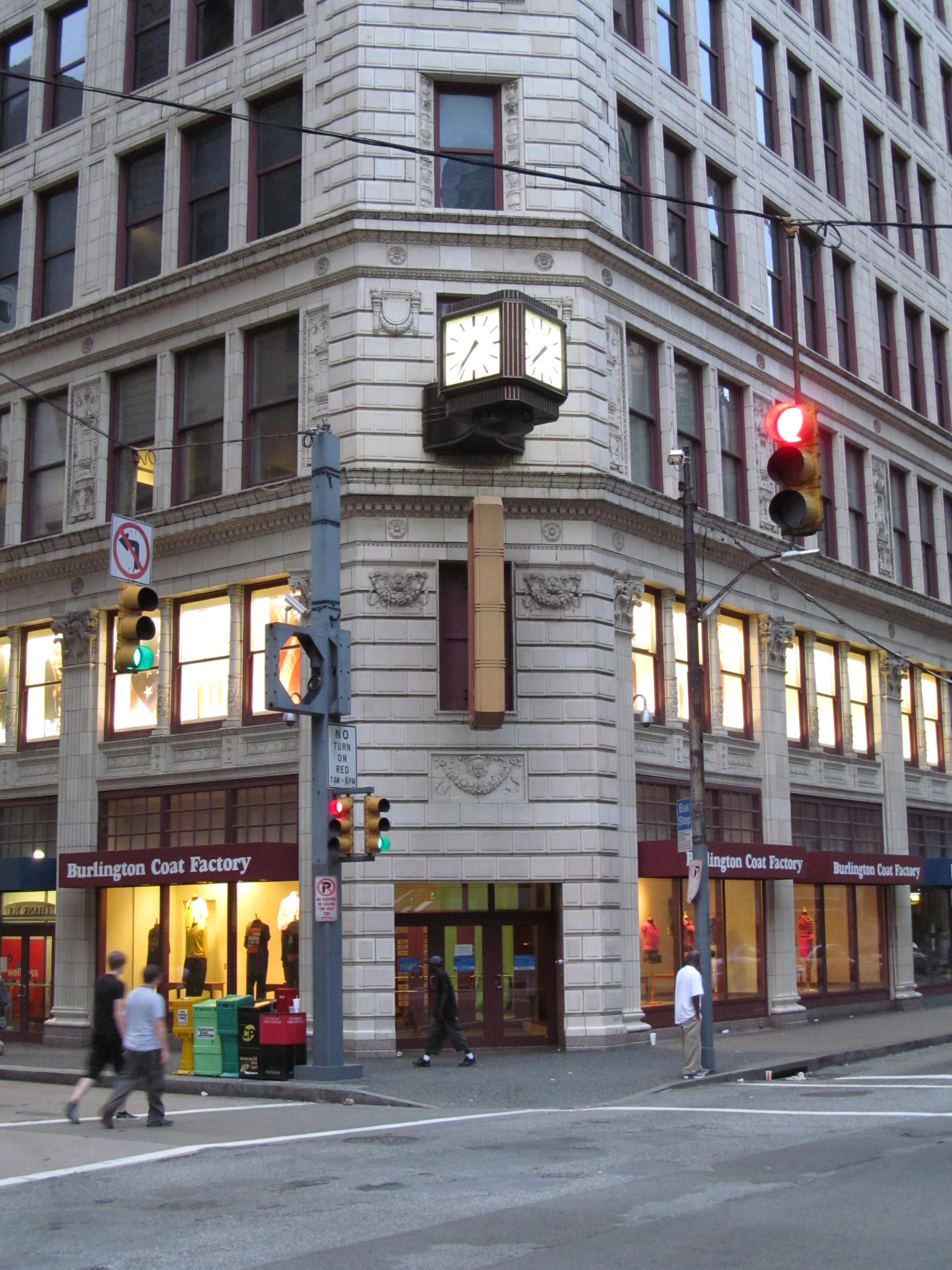
The iconic clock outside the Gimbels flagship in Pittsburgh

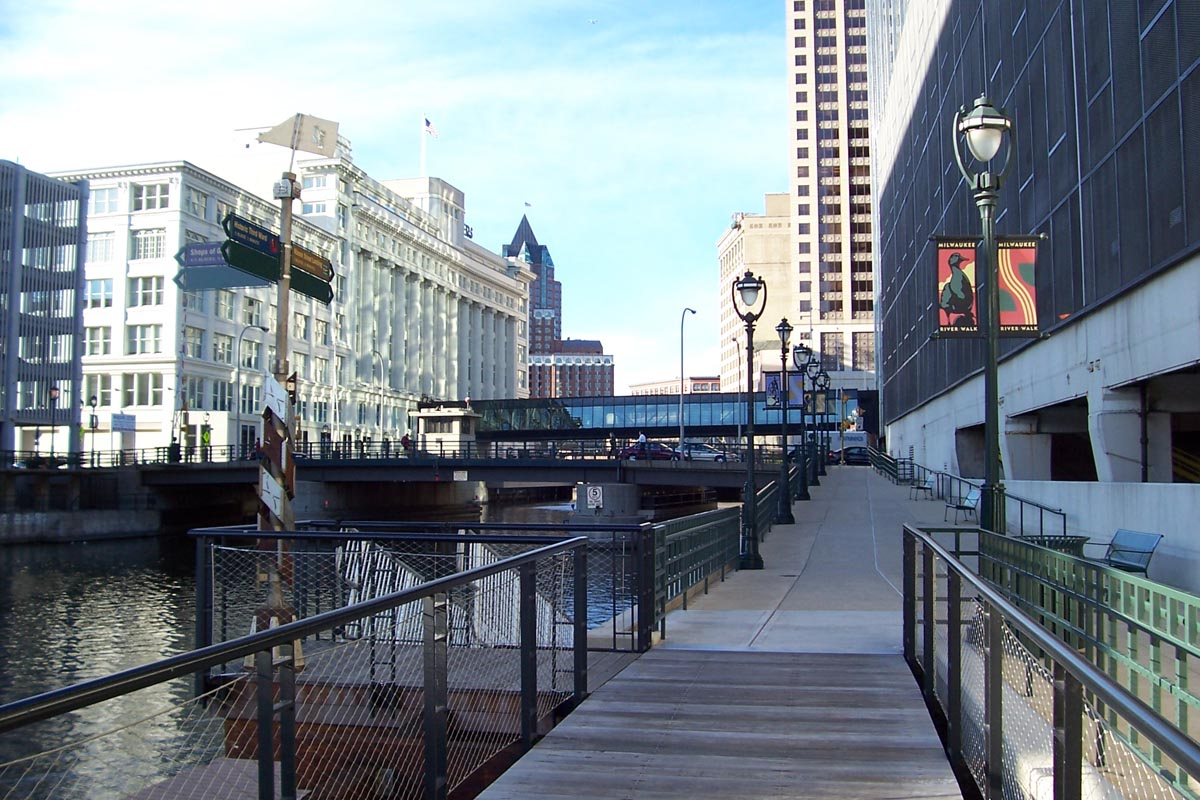
The former Milwaukee flagship, the large white building on the left

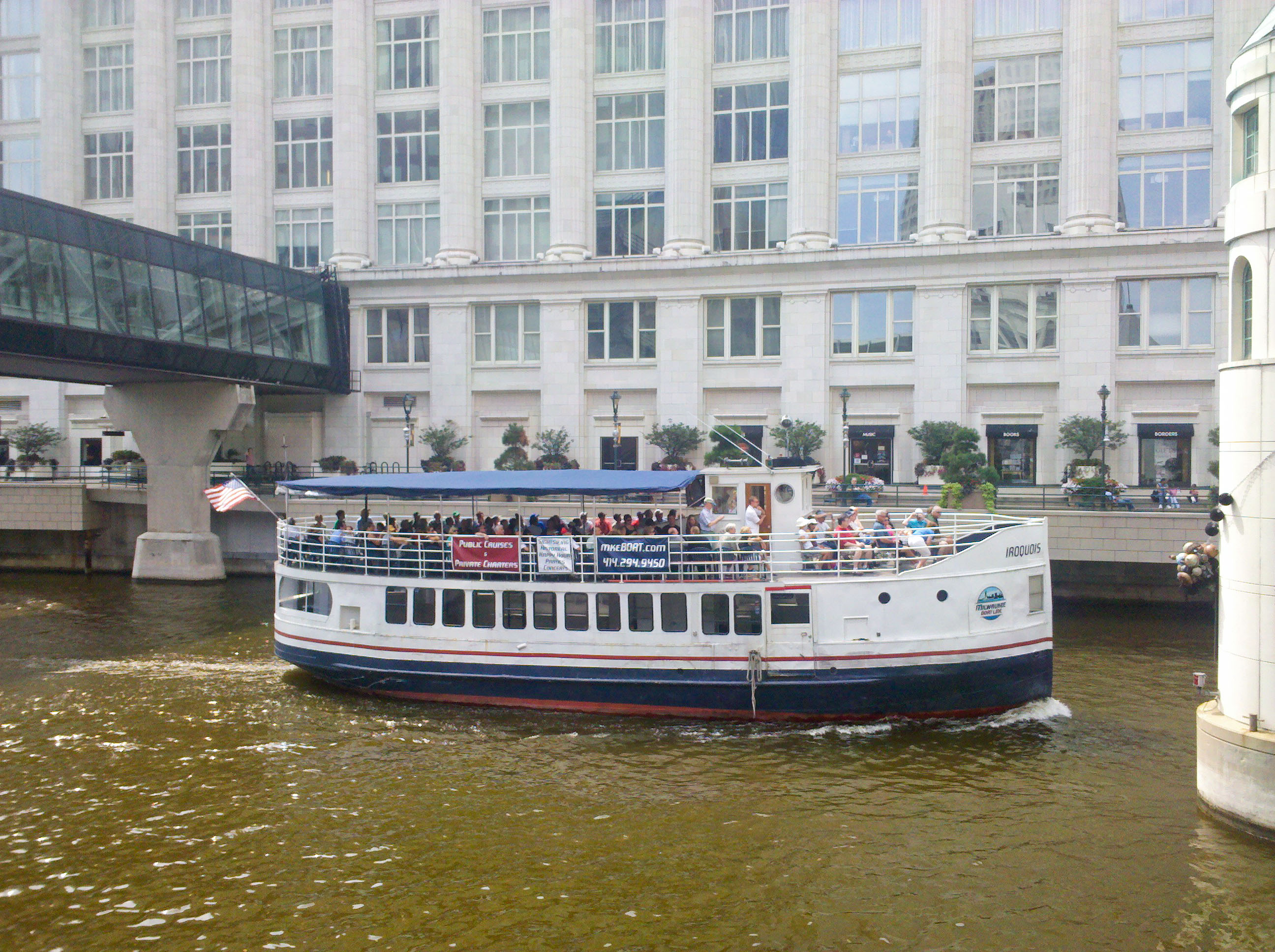
Riverboat passing the former Milwaukee flagship location
