= Saks Fifth Avenue store building =

Saks Fifth Avenue store building may refer to:

- Saks Fifth Avenue flagship store, Manhattan, New York
- 9600 Wilshire Boulevard, Saks Fifth Avenue store in Beverly Hills, California, 1938–2024
- 9570 Wilshire Boulevard, Saks Fifth Avenue store in Beverly Hills, California, since 2024
