= BLVD Place =

Mixed-use development in Houston, Texas

- Location: Houston, Texas, United States
- Coordinates: 29.749°N 95.463°W
- Opened: 2009 (Phase 1)
- Developer: Wulfe & Co.
- Manager: Whitestone REIT
- Architect: AECOM
- Floor area: 124,644 sq ft (11,579.8 m^{2}) retail 92,234 sq ft (8,568.8 m^{2}) office
- Website: blvdplace.com

BLVD Place is a mixed-use development located in Uptown Houston, Houston, Texas, United States, encompassing 20 acres at the intersection of Post Oak Boulevard and San Felipe.

The development is the largest in Uptown with over 1.8 million square feet with 124,644 sq ft (11,579.8 m^{2}) of retail space and 92,234 sq ft (8,568.8 m^{2}) of office space. BLVD Place is home to Whole Foods Market and numerous upscale shops, boutiques, and restaurants. Phase II of the development contains about 211,000 sq ft (19,600 m^{2}) of retail, restaurant, and office space, and is 99.9% leased. Phase I, including 70,000 sq ft (6,500 m^{2}) of retail and office space, was completed in 2009. It is located on the former site of a strip mall and a 1972 mall originally called the Saks Fifth Avenue Center of Fashion (later "Pavilion at Post Oak").

== History ==
By 2005, Wulfe & Co. owned a strip mall at the south end of the current BLVD Place, then acquired the Pavilion at Post Oak mall occupying the north end of the site. The mall, which originally went by the glamorous name of Saks Fifth Avenue Center of Fashion, had long been in decline, especially since losing its anchor department store, Saks Fifth Avenue, in 1997 when Saks moved to a new $50 million location in The Galleria less than a mile away. In 2005 Wulfe announced its plans to demolish the Pavilion and use both parcels to create BLVD Place in phases. The mall site is roughly the location of BLVD Place 6, and has the mall's old address, 1800 S. Post Oak.

The Hanover Co. constructed a 29-story high-rise residential tower in BLVD Place, known as Hanover Post Oak, on 1.2 acres (0.49 ha) at the southwest corner of Post Oak Lane and San Felipe.

In May 2012, Energy company Apache Corporation, currently headquartered nearby at Post Oak Central, acquired 6.4 acres (2.6 ha) in BLVD Place for their Houston headquarters.

Frost Bank signed a lease in Phase II of BLVD Place for 53,000 sq ft (4,900 m^{2}). The bank will consolidate its Houston region headquarters into the new space.

In April 2017, the real estate investment trust, Whitestone REIT, announced plans to buy the development for, along with Eldorado Plaza, $204.6 million. The eventually acquired the development for $158 million.

== See also ==
- Architecture of Houston
