= Andrew Saks =

American businessman (1847–1912)

- Born: June 5, 1847; Baltimore, Maryland, U.S.
- Died: April 8, 1912 (aged 64); New York City, U.S.
- Occupation: Retail businessman
- Title: Founder of department store Saks Fifth Avenue
- Spouse: Jennie Rohr
- Children: 3

Andrew Saks (June 5, 1847 – April 8, 1912) was an American businessman known as the founder of department store Saks Fifth Avenue.

== Biography ==
Saks was born to a German Jewish family, in Baltimore, Maryland, the son of Helena and William Saks (Wilhelm Sachs; born 1810 or 1811, Kingdom of Bavaria). He worked as a peddler and paper boy before moving to Washington, D.C., where he established a men's clothing store with his brother Isadore in 1867. In 1902, they opened a store in New York on 34th Street as Saks & Company. Saks ran the New York store as a family affair with his brother Isadore, and his sons Horace and William.

== Personal life ==
Saks married Jennie Rohr with whom he had three children. He died on April 9, 1912. His daughter, Leila Saks Meyer (1886–1957), returning to attend her father's funeral, survived the sinking of the RMS Titanic in 1912 (five days after his death); her husband, Edgar J. Meyer, son of financier Marc Eugene Meyer and brother of publisher Eugene Meyer, perished.

In 1923, his son Horace sold a majority interest in Saks & Company to Gimbel Brothers, Inc. for $8 million which included Saks & Company's $4.5 million flagship store that was under construction; Horace Saks remained as president. In 1924, Horace Saks and his cousin, Bernard Gimbel, opened Saks Fifth Avenue in New York City.

== See also ==
- Saks Fifth Avenue
- Saks-34th Street
