= Beachwood Place =

Shopping mall in Beachwood, Ohio, U.S.

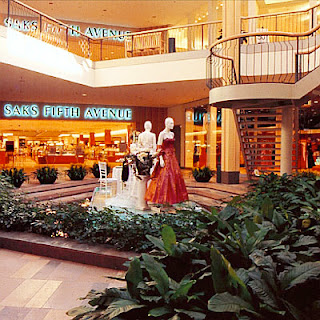
- Saks Fifth Avenue court
- Location: Beachwood, Ohio, United States
- Coordinates: 41.498526°N 81.493975°W
- Address: 26300 Cedar Road
- Opened: August 21, 1978; 48 years ago
- Renovated: 1997; 29 years ago (expansion); 2007; 19 years ago (renovation)
- Developer: The Rouse Company
- Manager: Trademark Property Company
- Owner: Trademark Property Company
- Architect: RTKL Associates
- Num. of stores: 137
- Num. of anchor tenants: 3 (2 open 1 vacant)
- Floor area: 977,613 sq ft (90,800 m^{2})
- Floors: 2 (3 in Nordstrom and Dillard’s)
- Parking: 4,211 spaces Surface parking, covered parking, and valet
- Public transit: RTA
- Website: beachwoodplace.com

Beachwood Place is a shopping mall located in Beachwood, Ohio, an affluent Greater Cleveland suburb roughly 10 miles (16 km) from downtown Cleveland. The mall is anchored by Dillard's (247,000 square feet (22,900 m^{2})) and Nordstrom (215,000 square feet (20,000 m^{2})).

== History ==
=== 20th century ===
Beachwood Place was developed by Beachwood Place, Inc., a subsidiary of The Rouse Company. The developer invested over a decade of time in studies and planning to create an upscale fashion center for wealthy people in Cleveland. Beachwood Place opened on August 21, 1978. When it first opened, it was anchored by Higbee's and Saks Fifth Avenue and included 110 specialty shops. It was Saks' first Ohio store.

Beachwood Place was unique in its design with winding staircases. The mall found success as area shoppers slowly abandoned nearby malls such as Randall Park Mall and Severance Town Center as well as retail outlets in downtown Cleveland.

In 1992, Higbee's became Dillard's and the developer began work on an addition to the mall. However, nearby residents took the developer to court to halt expansion. Their efforts were unsuccessful and the expansion was completed, after over two years, with a grand reopening on September 18, 1997. The food court was not changed, despite original renovation plans that intended to remove the food court and spread restaurants throughout the mall. The expansion added Nordstrom, which anchored the new, 40 store wing. In addition to Nordstrom, an Eddie Bauer flagship store opened at the main entrance, Dillard's added a third floor, and Saks also expanded.

=== 21st century ===
In 2004, The Rouse Company was acquired by General Growth Properties. The new owners immediately began a remodeling that was completed in time for the 2007 Christmas season. Landscaping and natural light was used to soften the entry and kinetic art was installed to create a greater visual dynamic. The food court was relocated to the second floor; with the new area being defined by natural light and more seating.

On November 4, 2022, the Beachwood police opened a field office on the second floor of the mall across from the food court. Two officers will be stationed there in order to enhance community relations between the police and the public.

In January 2026, GGP, a subsidiary of Brookfield Properties, sold the mall to Trademark Property Company. On March 6, 2026, Saks Global announced the closure of 12 Saks Fifth Avenue and three Neiman Marcus locations nationwide in an effort to further cut costs and focus on more profitable locations, including the Saks store at Beachwood Place.

== Planned expansion ==
In January 2013, General Growth Properties announced plans to expand the mall; citing four lost leasing opportunities due to its 96% occupancy rate. There are 11 residential parcels on the western edge of the mall which can be rezoned. Plans were released in July 2013 showing a 77,000-square-foot (7,200 m^{2}) expansion including three standalone restaurants added along the perimeter. Nearby residents and local businessmen voiced concern about increased traffic and a loss of a barrier between the mall and the surrounding residences. During the summer months, the owner sought signatures from residents to allow plans of its expansion to be put on a city referendum. In October 2013, the Beachwood City Council voted to amend the City's codified ordinances, allowing the expansion to proceed. In 2015, the City Council forced a reduction in the planned expansion from 77,000 to 43,000 sq ft (7,200 to 4,000 m^{2}).
