= Saks Fifth Avenue Center of Fashion =

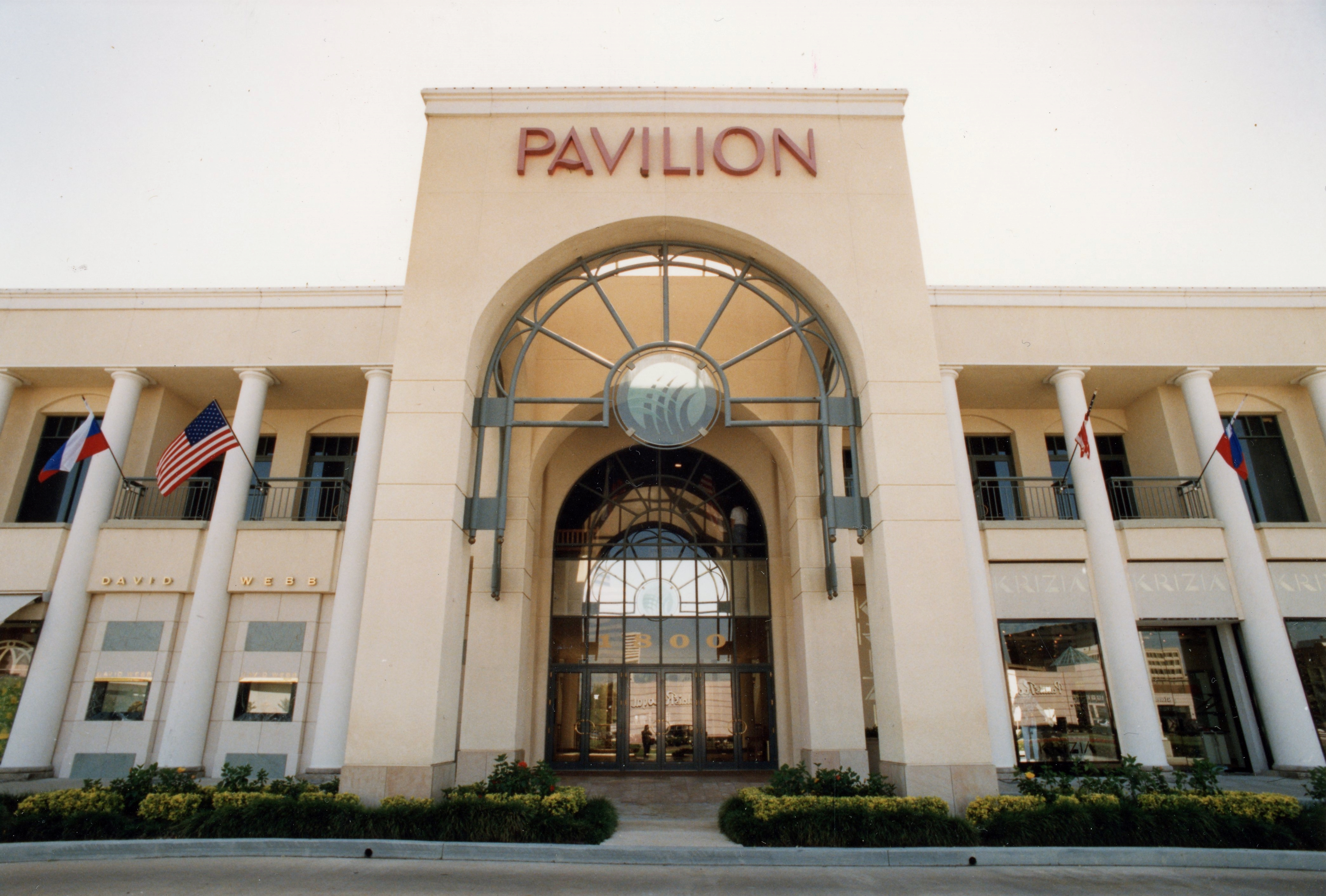
- Main entrance of the Pavilion in 1992
- Location: Uptown Houston, Houston, Texas, United States
- Coordinates: 29°44′51.75″N 95°27′43.07″W
- Address: 1800 Post Oak Boulevard, Houston, TX 77056
- Opened: 1974
- Closed: c. 2011
- Previous names: Pavilion Saks Fifth Avenue; Pavilion at Post Oak
- Num. of anchor tenants: 1
- Floors: 2 (indoor wing)
- Parking: Underground parking
- Some businesses remained operational until 2011, including the restaurant Américas, which closed in August 2011. The former Pavilion was demolished in 2012.

Saks Fifth Avenue Center of Fashion, later Pavilion Saks Fifth Avenue, then Pavilion at Post Oak, was a shopping center in Uptown Houston open from 1974 through around 2011, originally centered around a large 240,000 sq ft (22,000 m^{2}) Saks Fifth Avenue store which closed in 1997. The mall struggled after losing Saks, but continued to operate for ten more years, and finally closed around 2011. The Pavilion mall was demolished and the site is now part of the BLVD Place mixed-use development.

== History ==
=== Opening ===
By the early 1970s, then-owners Gimbel Bros. had decided to expand the Saks Fifth Avenue brand into the Houston market. They planned to open a large SFA store accompanied by a small number of specialty shops along the then-successful model pioneered by Los Angeles-based Bullock's with its "Fashion Square" centers. It chose a property about 0.8 miles (1.3 km) from The Galleria, which had opened in 1969 anchored by Dallas-based Neiman Marcus, a powerful and local competitor to SFA in the upscale and luxury department store segments.

SFA was the fourth department store to open in the Uptown or Post Oak area, following Sakowitz, Joske's, Neiman Marcus. Construction began in 1973 and the 240,000 sq ft (22,000 m^{2}) Saks store and its Center of Fashion opened in 1974 with a 35-year lease through 2008.

The outdoor mall was officially named "Saks Fifth Avenue Center of Fashion" but was also referred by many variations on the name including Saks Fashion Center, Saks Fifth Avenue Center, SFA Center and Saks Fifth Avenue Mall. From what I could tell, the mall also had a lower level, as a movie theater operated by Loews (opened July 1974) had always been there as well. Other stores in the center in these days included Sahadi's Gallery, Courrèges Boutique, and Houlihan's Old Place.

By that time British American Tobacco (BATUS) had bought Gimbel Bros., and BATUS sold the mall to Investcorp, a U.K. pension fund, in 1977.

=== 1980s ===
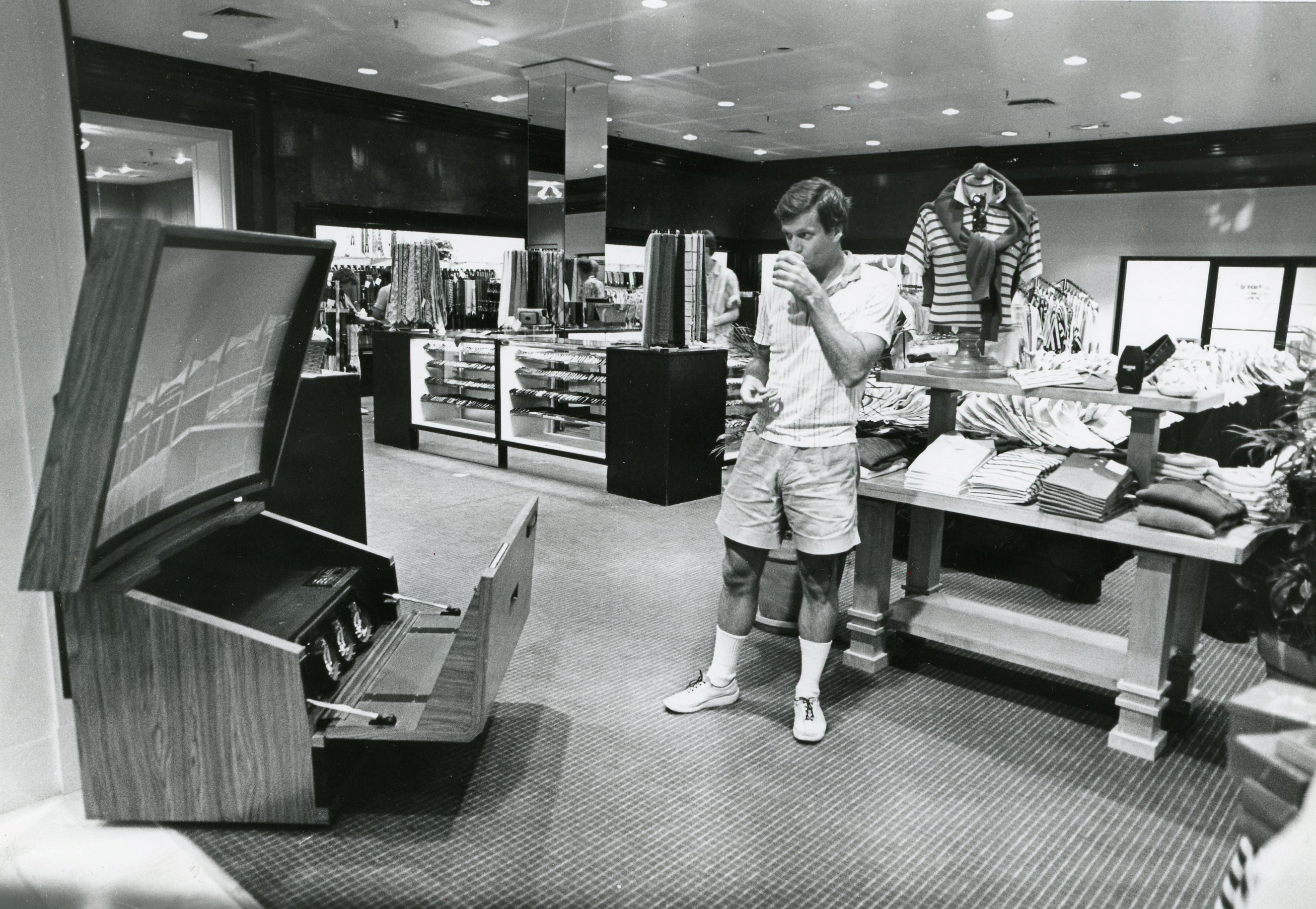
Saks Fifth Avenue in Houston in 1987.

During 1987-8 the mall was remodeled by Dallas-based Kenneth H. Hughes Interests, including a new 2-story indoor wing on the site of the front parking lot, and a new name: Pavilion Saks Fifth Avenue (also referred to as Saks Fifth Avenue Pavilion). The new wing opened in late 1988 accompanied by a lavish gala.

The revamped Pavilion featured luxurious design with glass corridors, floors of Arizona-sourced flagstones, fountains, mahogany handrails, 90 palm trees, and an underground parking deck. New tenants included Hermès, Christian Lacroix and a new location of Dallas-based Italian/Californian bistro, Sfuzzi. Many existing tenants expanded their stores and/or relocated to the new wing.

=== 1990s rapid decline ===
1990 occupancy at the Pavilion had increased, reaching 90%, but as soon as 1992, the mall was in decline, with just one store operating on its upper level. Despite marketing itself as Houston's version of Rodeo Drive, the Pavilion continued to lose shoppers and retailers to The Galleria, which was much larger, had four department store anchors versus the Pavilion's one anchor, as well as a mix of both upscale and mainstream stores.

Meanwhile further west in Houston, on May 1 of that year, Saks closed the other Houston SFA store at West Oaks Mall, which had opened in 1983.

In 1993, Landmark Cinemas took over operation of the cinema multiplex, and started to show more independent films alongside mainstream ones. However, the auditoriums were large and lacked the intimate feeling of arthouse theaters. The theaters closed in July 1995.

Also in 1995, the center was foreclosed on and new ownership sought to add more entertainment options to the mall, including a bookstore, restaurants, or the return of a movie theater. Despite many remaining ultra-high-end tenants, occupancy was down to 70%, the second and third floors were mostly empty. It was then questionable if Saks wanted to stay at the Pavilion long-term.

In early 1996, the mall was renamed a second time, to "Pavilion at Post Oak", removing "Saks Fifth Avenue" as part of its name, stating its intention to better communicate its diverse mix of retailers beyond just its anchor department store.

=== Saks pullout ===
In August 1996, Marshall Field's announced that it would pull out of Texas and close its four stores there by the end of the year. That same month, Saks Fifth Avenue announced that it would acquire three of those four locations:

- a 240,000 sq ft (22,000 m^{2}) unit at The Galleria, 0.8 miles (1.3 km) south of Saks' Pavilion,
- Town & Country mall, also in Houston about 8 miles west of The Galleria, and
- Dallas Galleria

Saks did not acquire Field's San Antonio North Star Mall location; it had already operated a store at North Star since 1985.

In 1997 Saks announced a plan to closed its store at the Pavilion and move to its newly-acquired location at The Galleria, in which it would invest $50 million. In reaction, the mall's landlord, Radler Pavilion Ltd., sued Saks for $130 million, as its lease lasted through 2008, and prohibited Saks from sub-leasing the store, or convert it to a discount store. Saks settled and closed its Pavilion store on September 3, 1997, opening its new Galleria store on September 11, 1997.

=== Further decline, closing and demolition ===
As a condition of the settlement, Saks opened a new specialty department store at its old Pavilion site, Fashion At The Pavilion, about a month later on October 3, 1997. The store sold a limited range of clothing, accessories, jewelry, and home furnishings, but closed in June 1998 after less than one year. By January 2000, without an anchor, mall occupancy had dwindled to 12% with Esther Wulfe, Hermès, and a few restaurants remaining.

In 2005, landlord Wulfe & Co., which had acquired the mall, announced plans to demolish the mall in phases together with an adjacent strip mall that it owned, to make way for BLVD Place, a denser mixed-use development planned to contain upscale retail shops and restaurants, mid- and high-rise residential units, and a 225-room upscale hotel, all together 375,000 sq ft (34,800 m^{2}) in area.

The former Saks store was torn down by late 2007. However, some businesses continued operating at the Pavilion after that date. Hermès remained open in January 2008, while the restaurant Américas continued operating until August 2011, ahead of the property's redevelopment into BLVD Place. Demolition was complete by 2012. The site is now occupied by "BLVD Place 6".
