= 9570 Wilshire Boulevard =

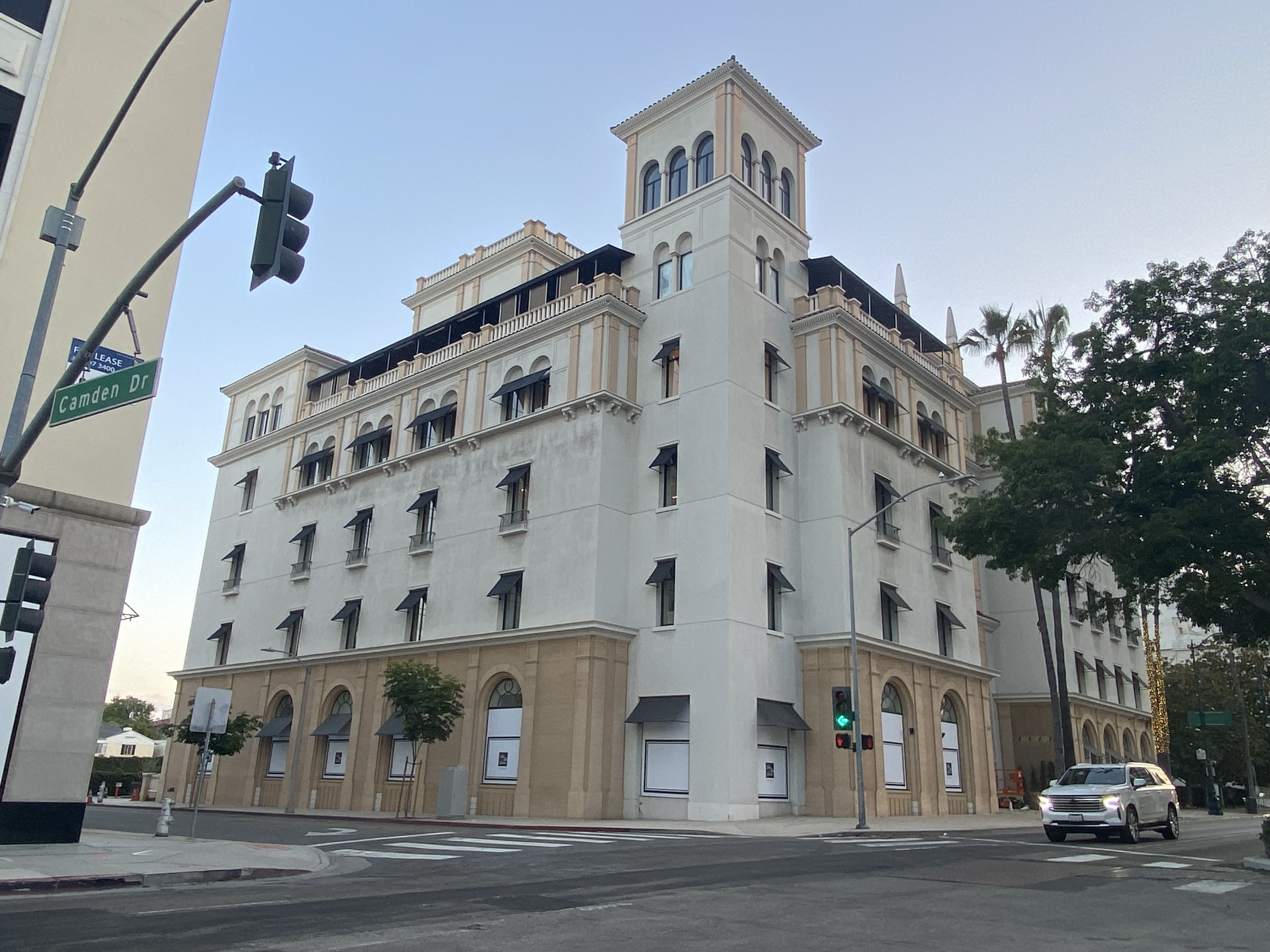
- Interactive map of the 9570 Wilshire Boulevard area

General information
- Architectural style: Italianate
- Location: 9570 Wilshire Boulevard, Beverly Hills, California, United States
- Coordinates: 34.066750°N 118.402720°W
- Current tenants: Saks Fifth Avenue (2024–present)
- Opened: 1994
- Renovated: 2013–2014; 2022–2024
- Owner: Ashkenazy Acquisition (2001–present)

Technical details
- Floor count: 5
- Floor area: 115,000 ft^{2} (10,700 m^{2})

Design and construction
- Architects: Peter Marino; Jeffrey Hutchison

Renovating team
- Architects: Steven Harris; Lucien Rees-Roberts

Other information
- Public transit access: Beverly Drive (2026): D Line

Website
- saksfifthavenue.com/locations/s/beverlyhills

9570 Wilshire Boulevard is a building located within the Golden Triangle business district of Beverly Hills, California. It originally housed a Barneys New York department store from 1994 until 2020, and has housed a Saks Fifth Avenue department store (which relocated from the adjacent 9600 Wilshire Boulevard) since 2024. It is considered a second flagship store by the company, after the flagship store in New York City.

== Architecture ==
Jeffrey Hutchison and Peter Marino designed the Barneys New York building in the Italianate style. Many design features first used by the company in the Beverly Hills store would become hallmarks for future locations, including marble mosaic flooring, large staircases, and skylights. Steven Harris and Lucien Rees-Roberts incorporated the original style with modern design elements for the 2013–2014 renovation. The signature spiral staircase and skylight were retained during the 2022–2024 renovation before Saks Fifth Avenue moved into the building. The $52 million renovation was overseen by design company CallisonRTKL, and incorporated design elements that tie into the Saks Fifth Avenue flagship store in Midtown Manhattan.

== History ==
=== 1994–2020: Barneys New York ===
The 9570 Wilshire Boulevard site originally consisted of two parking lots and two office buildings, tenants of which included American Savings and Progressive Savings. New York City-based Barneys New York announced the purchase of the site in 1989. The company planned to open a full-line department store in Beverly Hills by 1993, however, the store ultimately opened on March 5, 1994. Barneys filed for bankruptcy in 1996, and entered into a leaseback agreement with Isetan in which the Beverly Hills, Chicago, and New York City properties were sold to and leased from Isetan to keep the stores open. Isetan sold the three stores to Ashkenazy Acquisition in 2001 for $175 million, with the value of the Beverly Hills store estimated at $34 million.

Barneys filed for bankruptcy again in August 2019, and the Beverly Hills store was expected to be one of five stores remaining in the company. However, the remaining five locations began liquidation sales by November, and the Beverly Hills store closed permanently on February 23, 2020. Prior to closing, it was considered one of the most successful locations in the company.

=== 2022–present: Saks Fifth Avenue ===
Meanwhile, the Saks Fifth Avenue department store at the adjacent 9600 Wilshire Boulevard opened in 1938, and was considered a second flagship store by the company, after the flagship store in New York City. Hudson's Bay Company executives, however, were growing frustrated with the lack of development in the neighborhood by 2016. The company planned to make do within the existing store until the Barneys building became empty in 2020, and the licensed Barneys-at-Saks fifth floor in the New York City flagship store proved successful in 2021, at which point the brands' synergy was evident.

In June 2022, HBC announced that it would relocate the existing Saks store into the vacant Barneys building, and overhaul the original store into a mixed-use development. The Barneys location was attractive because of its proximity to Rodeo Drive, one block closer than the original store, which Saks management expects will result in more walk-in traffic.

The existing store closed on February 1, 2024, and the relocated store opened on February 8. The standalone men's store at 9634 Wilshire Boulevard, which opened in the former I. Magnin building in 1995, remained in its existing location during the reconfiguration. The women's store and men's store on opposite ends of the street are intended to "anchor" the overall project.
