= 9600 Wilshire Boulevard =

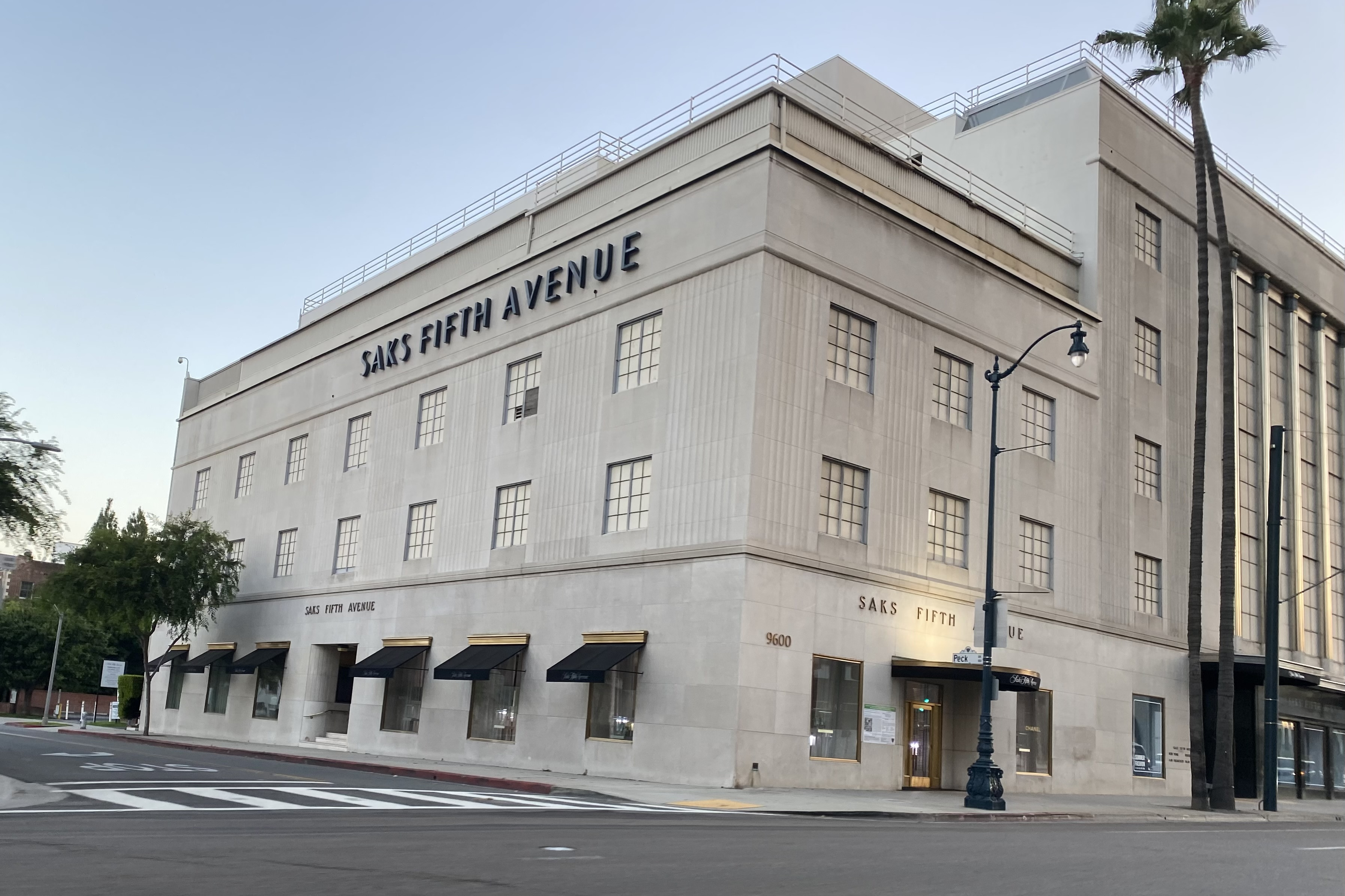

General information
- Architectural style: Hollywood Regency
- Location: 9600 Wilshire Boulevard, Beverly Hills, California, United States
- Coordinates: 34.066916°N 118.404141°W
- Opened: 1938
- Renovated: 1940; 1948

Technical details
- Floor area: 85,900 ft^{2} (7,980 m^{2})

Design and construction
- Architect: John and Donald Parkinson
- Architecture firm: Parkinson and Parkinson
- Other designers: Paul R. Williams (interior design)

Renovating team
- Architect: Paul R. Williams

Other information
- Public transit: Beverly Drive (2026): D Line

Website
- 9600wilshire.com

9600 Wilshire Boulevard is a building located within the Golden Triangle business district of Beverly Hills, California. It housed a Saks Fifth Avenue department store from its completion in 1938, and was considered a second flagship store by the company, after the flagship store in New York City. The store relocated to the adjacent 9570 Wilshire Boulevard in 2024, and the original location will be converted into a mixed-use development by Hudson's Bay Company.

== History ==
=== 1938–2024: Saks Fifth Avenue ===
It was designed by the architectural firm Parkinson and Parkinson, with interiors by Paul R. Williams. The store opened in 1938. The exterior of the building was designed by the Parkinsons, with the interior completed by Williams in the Hollywood Regency style. David Gebhard and Robert Winter, writing in Los Angeles: An Architectural Guide described the building as having "enough curved surface to suggest that the thirties Streamline Moderne could be elegant". The store was expanded and redesigned by Williams in 1940 and 1948. The store was immediately successful upon opening and it would subsequently expand to almost 74,000 square feet (6,900 m^{2}) and employ 500 people.

Williams's designs for the store marked a departure from traditional department stores by reducing the emphasis on commerciality that foresaw the rise of boutique stores in the 1980s and 1990s. Only a few examples of merchandise were displayed in hidden recesses. The President of Saks Fifth Avenue, Adam Gimbel, said in an interview with the Los Angeles Times that "Each room attempts to create a mood which is in keeping with the merchandise sold there. For example, a Pompeian room done in cool green with appropriate frieze is used for beach and swimming pool costumes and a French provincial room houses informal sports and country clothes The accessories are carried in an oval room done in a Regency spirit".

The individual shipping areas of the store were semi-enclosed which prevented distraction for customers. Williams created an interior reminiscent of his designs for luxurious private residences, with rooms lit by indirect lamps and footlights focused on the clothes. New departments for furs, corsets, gifts and debutante dresses were added in the 1940 expansion.

The Terrace Restaurant, a rooftop restaurant run by Perino's, served customers for several years. It was expanded in the 1940s renovations to provide cover during inclement weather.

Saks operates a The Mens Store in an adjacent building at 9634 Wilshire Boulevard.

=== 2024–present: Redevelopment ===
In June 2022, Hudson's Bay Company announced plans to convert the 9600 Wilshire Boulevard building into a mixed-use development with office, retail, and residential components. By 2023, Saks Fifth Avenue is expected to be relocated into the adjacent 9570 Wilshire Boulevard storefront, which was left vacant by the defunct Barneys New York since February 2020.

== In popular culture ==
The store is featured in the 2005 film Shopgirl. The original novella is set in Neiman Marcus, but Saks Fifth Avenue lobbied the filmmakers to portray their store instead.
