= Saks Fifth Avenue =

American international department store chain

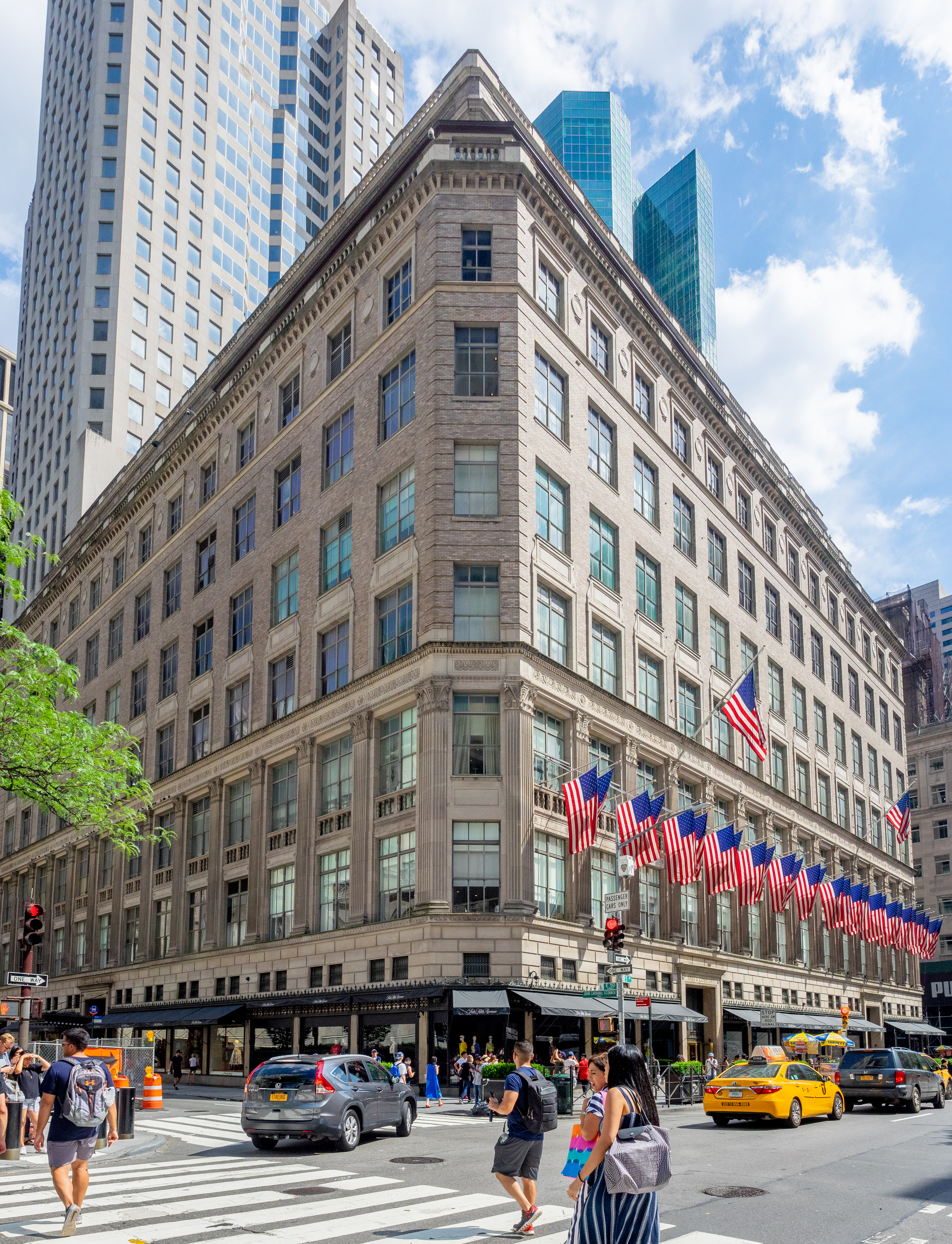
- Exterior of the flagship store in Midtown Manhattan (2019)
- Formerly: A. Saks & Co.; Saks & Company
- Type: Subsidiary
- Industry: Retail
- Genre: Department stores
- Founded: 1867; 159 years ago in Washington D.C., United States
- Founder: Andrew Saks
- Headquarters: New York City, United States
- Number of locations: 42
- Areas served: United States; Kazakhstan
- Products: Clothing, footwear, handbags, luggage, jewelry, cosmetics, fragrances, bedding, bath, home decor, and housewares
- Parent: Gimbels (1923–1973); Brown & Williamson (1973–1980); Batus Inc. (1980–1990); Investcorp (1990–1998); Saks, Inc. (1998–2013); Hudson's Bay Company (2013–2024); Exemplar Luxury Group (Note: Formerly known as Saks Global from 2024 to 2026.) (2024–Present)
- Website: saksfifthavenue.com

Saks Fifth Avenue (colloquially Saks) is an upmarket American department store chain founded in 1867 by Andrew Saks. The first store opened in the F Street shopping district of Washington, D.C., and expanded into Manhattan with its Herald Square store in 1902. Saks was bought by the Gimbels department store chain in 1923 and expanded nationwide during this ownership, and opened its flagship store on Fifth Avenue in 1924. Gimbels and Saks were acquired by Brown & Williamson in 1973, and transferred to sister company Batus Inc. in 1980. While Gimbels was liquidated in 1987, Saks was sold to Investcorp in 1990. Saks Off 5th was established as a Saks clearance store the same year, and has since evolved into an off-price store chain. Saks was acquired by Proffitt's, Inc. (renamed Saks, Inc.) in 1998.

Saks, Inc. was acquired by the Hudson's Bay Company in 2013. Saks and Saks Off 5th were spun-off into Saks Global, and consequently became sister brands with department stores Bergdorf Goodman and Neiman Marcus, in 2024. As of 2026, Saks Fifth Avenue operates one international branch in Almaty, Kazakhstan. Stores previously operated in Canada through the Hudson's Bay Company from 2016 until 2025, in Mexico through a franchising agreement with Grupo Sanborns from 2007 until 2023, and across the Middle East from 2001 until 2025.

== Early history ==
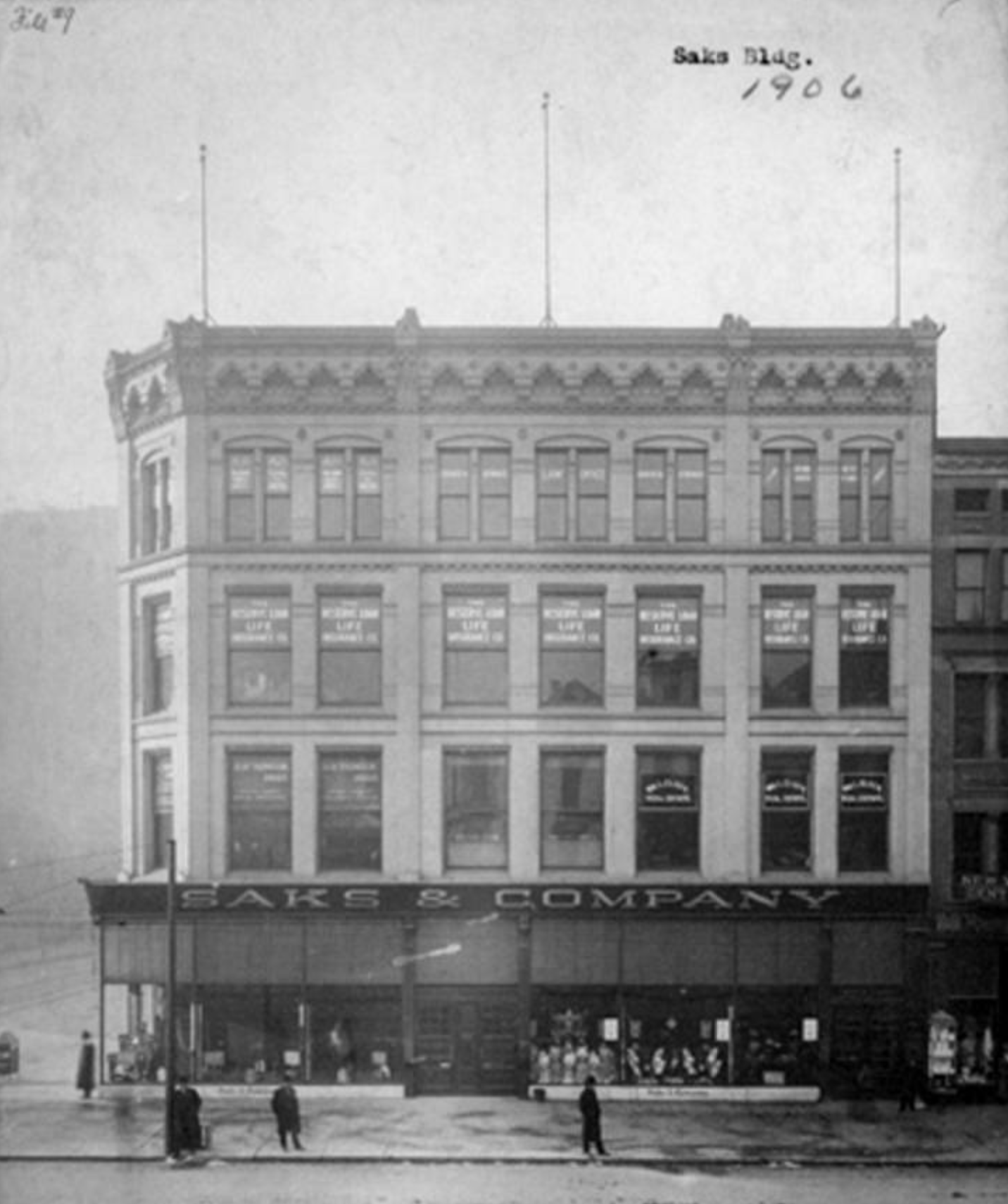
Saks & Co. Indianapolis, 1906

In 1867, brothers Isadore and Andrew Saks established the men's clothing store, A. Saks & Co. The company occupied a storefront in the Avenue House Hotel building at 517 (300–308) 7th Street, N.W., in what is still Washington's downtown shopping district. Saks offered his goods at one price only and offered refunds on merchandise returns. Saks was also known for its "forceful and interesting, but strictly truthful" newspaper advertising, according to the Washington Evening Star, including a two-page spread, large for that time, in that newspaper on April 4, 1898. In 1887, Saks acquired began building a new location on the site of the old Avenue Hotel Building at 7th and Market Space (now United States Navy Memorial Plaza).

By 1896, Saks and Co. had stores in Norfolk and Richmond, Virginia; New York City; and Indianapolis, in addition to Washington, D.C., where, Saks called itself "Washington's Wonderful Store".

== 20th-century history ==
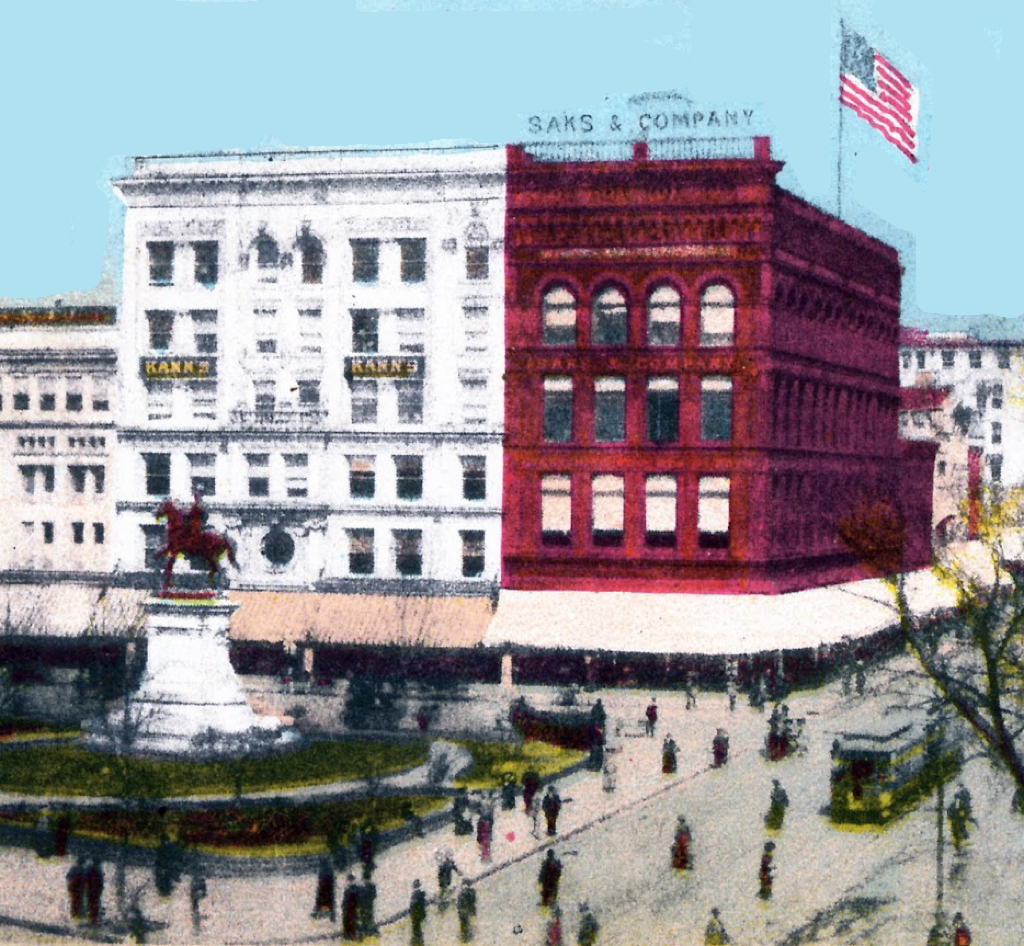
Saks and Co. and Kann's, NW corner of 7th St. and Pennsylvania Av., Washington, D.C. (1920)

Saks opened its New York City Herald Square on 34th Street and Broadway in 1902. Andrew Saks ran the New York store as a family business with his brother Isadore, and his sons Horace and William. Following Andrew Saks' death in 1912, his son Horace took over the company's management.

=== Gimbels ownership ===
In 1923, Saks & Co. merged with Gimbel Brothers, Inc., owned by a cousin of Horace Saks, Bernard Gimbel, operating as a separate autonomous subsidiary. In September 1924, the two opened a location architected by Starrett & van Vleck the Saks Fifth Avenue Building. The location acquired a full-block avenue frontage south of St. Patrick's Cathedral, facing what would become Rockefeller Center.

==== 1920s - 1930s ====
Following Horace Saks' death in 1926, Adam Gimbel became president of Saks Fifth Avenue in 1926. The company then expanded, opening seasonal resort branches in Palm Beach (1926), Atlantic City (1927), Lincoln Road in Miami Beach (1929), Southampton on Long Island (1931), Newport, Rhode Island (1935), Sun Valley, Idaho and Westbury, L.I. (1936), and Greenwich, Connecticut (1937).

In 1929, Saks opened its first full-line, year-round flagship store in Chicago. Six years later, the flagship store relocated to a larger location. By the end of the 1930s, Saks Fifth Avenue had a total of 10 stores – the two urban flagships in New York and Chicago, and eight resort stores.

==== 1940s - 1960s ====
During World War II, Saks opened Navy and Army shops in New Haven, Connecticut, and Princeton, New Jersey, and after the war turned the small branches into University Shops, catering to the Ivy League communities there.

By 1940, Saks opened two additional urban flagship stores: in Beverly Hills, and in Detroit. Three more downtown stores opened between 1949 and 1952, including Pittsburgh, Philadelphia, and San Francisco.

Saks Fifth Avenue's first department store in a mall opened in 1954, at Sunrise Center, now The Galleria at Fort Lauderdale. Additional locations opened in malls through the 1990s.

A few of the new suburban stores were freestanding in suburbs that had a significant downtown shopping district, such as in White Plains, New York (1954), and both Garden City, Long Island, and Surfside, near Miami in 1962. Additional stores were built in downtown locations, such as New Orleans, Boston, and Minneapolis.

More University Shops opened, one near Harvard in Cambridge, Mass., another in Ann Arbor, Michigan (1960).

==== 1990s - 2020s ====
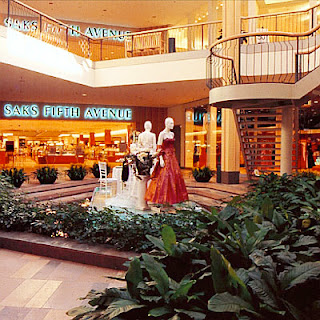
Beachwood Place Location: Operated 1989-2026

More expansion followed through in the 1990s in Texas, Florida and California. Plans to open in Mexico City were cancelled following the Mexican peso crisis in 1995. California-based I. Magnin closed in 1995, allowing Saks acquired former I. Magnin locations following the latter's closing in 1995, allowing for expansion into San Diego's Fashion Valley and Carmel. The company opened an additional set of downtown locations in areas such as Pasadena, Santa Barbara, and San Diego's La Jolla in California, and in Greenwich, Connecticut, and Charleston, South Carolina.

In Texas, Saks acquired three Texas locations where Marshall Field's was exiting. In 1997 Saks moved its main Houston store from the Saks Pavilion to The Galleria and added a new location at Town & Country. In the Dallas Galleria, Saks moved within the mall to a larger location. In addition to the former Field's locations, Saks Austin opened in 1997 and Fort Worth in 2000.

In Florida in the 1990s, seven Saks Fifth Avenue stores opened, for a total of 11 stores by the end of the decade, adding Palm Beach Gardens, Naples, Fort Myers, Orlando, Sarasota, Tampa and doubled the size of its Boca Raton store.

== Acquisitions and mergers ==
=== Acquisition by Brown & Williamson and BATUS, Inc ===
In 1973, tobacco conglomerate, Brown & Williamson acquired the Gimbels chain, including Saks Fifth Avenue brand. In 1990, Brown & Williamson, under the name BATUS, sold Saks Fifth Avenue for $1.5 billion.

=== Acquisition by Investcorp and Proffitt's ===
Also in 1990, the company launched Saks Off 5th, an outlet store offshoot of the main brand, with 107 stores worldwide by 2016.

In 1998, Proffitt's, Inc., the parent company of Proffitt's and other department stores, acquired Saks Holdings, Inc. Upon completing the acquisition, Proffitt's, Inc., changed its name to Saks, Inc.

=== Acquisition by Hudson's Bay Company ===
In July 2013, Canada-based Hudson's Bay Company (HBC), the oldest commercial corporation in North America and owner of the competing chain Lord & Taylor, announced it would acquire Saks Fifth Avenue's parent company for $2.9 billion.

In 2015 Saks began a $250 million, three-year restoration of its Fifth Avenue flagship store. In October 2015, Saks announced a new location in Greenwich, Connecticut. In autumn 2015, Saks announced it would replace its existing store at the Houston Galleria with a new store.

On January 15, 2021, Saks Fifth Avenue unveiled a 54,000-square-foot (5,000 m^{2}) space on the fifth floor of its New York flagship, branded Barneys at Saks. The collaboration is aimed at continuing Barneys New York tradition of unearthing and promoting emerging designers. On January 25, Saks launched the first standalone Barneys at Saks store in a 14,000-square-foot (1,300 m^{2}) location in Greenwich, Connecticut. This marked the first time Saks had offered men's clothing and furnishings in that market. In March, HBC and growth capital investor, Insight Partners, established Saks Fifth Avenue's ecommerce business as a stand-alone entity, known as "Saks". Insight Partners made a $500 million minority equity investment in Saks. The retailer's 39-store fleet operates separately as an entity referred to as "SFA," which remained wholly owned by HBC. At the time of the separation, HBC named Marc Metrick, CEO of Saks, the ecommerce business. Metrick was previously president of Saks Fifth Avenue since 2015.

In April, Saks announced that it would close all 27 of its fur salons, among which New York, Boston, Philadelphia and Beverly Hills, by the end of January 2022. The company also said that by January 2023, it would stop sales of products made from fur of wild animals or from animals raised for their fur. In August, the company announced a collaboration with WeWork to convert some Saks spaces to co-working locations. In June 2022, Saks announced that it would convert the original 1938 store building in Beverly Hills, 9600 Wilshire, into offices and apartments. Saks Beverly Hills continued to operate from the former I. Magnin and Barneys buildings, which had previously been incorporated into the store complex.

=== Saks Global/Exemplar Luxury Group ===
In July 2024 Saks announced that it planned to acquire rival retailer Neiman Marcus in a reported $2.65 billion merger. The acquisition was finalised in December 2024 and Saks Fifth Avenue became part of the new holding company Saks Global. Amazon invested $475 million into Saks’ acquisition of Neiman Marcus.

==== Bankruptcy ====
On January 14, 2026, Saks Global filed for Chapter 11 bankruptcy protection after struggling with heavy debt relying on its acquisition and merger of Neiman Marcus. The company also blamed a rapid consumer shift in luxury goods due to inflating prices. Amazon filed an objection to Saks Global’s bankruptcy financing plan, citing the fact that Saks failed to hold up their agreement and worried that bankruptcy will push Amazon further down the repayment pecking order. The company reemerged from bankruptcy as Exemplar Luxury Group.

== 21st-century history ==
In 2004, Saks saw an annual sales growth rate of 7.7% on a same-store basis, but was underperforming Neiman Marcus (+17%) and Nordstrom (+10%). In Southern California, analysts said that Saks was "struggling to maintain its cachet" against the two competitors and Bloomingdales. On October 1, Saks announced the closing of eight underperforming stores: Pasadena, Palos Verdes, Mission Viejo, La Jolla and Carmel in California, Garden City NY, Hilton Head SC, and Downtown Minneapolis.

In August 2007, the United States Postal Service began an experimental program selling the plus ZIP code extension to businesses. The first company to do so was Saks Fifth Avenue, which received the ZIP code of 10022-7463 ("SHOE", on a U.S. touch-tone keypad) for the eighth-floor shoe department in its flagship Fifth Avenue store.

During the 2007–2009 recession, Saks had to cut prices and profit margins, thus according to Reuters "training shoppers to expect discounts. It took three years before it could start selling at closer to full price".

As of 2013, the New York flagship store, whose real estate value was estimated between $800 million and over $1 billion at the time, generated around 20% of Saks' annual sales at $620 million, with other stores being less profitable according to analysts.

In January 2026, Marc Metrick resigned as chief executive of the company with immediate effect. He was replaced by executive chairman Richard Baker, who will hold both positions.

After a 2026 restructuring, many locations will close, leaving the chain with 13 stores. The following Saks locations will close permanently:

- Walt Whitman (Huntington Station, New York)
- American Dream (East Rutherford, New Jersey)
- Bala Plaza (Philadelphia)
- Tysons Galleria (McLean, Virginia)
- Wisconsin Avenue (Chevy Chase, Maryland)
- Stony Point Fashion Park (Richmond, Virginia)
- Triangle Town Center (Raleigh, North Carolina)
- The Summit (Birmingham, Alabama)
- Shops at Canal Place (New Orleans)
- Beachwood Place (Beachwood, Ohio)
- Polaris Fashion Place (Columbus, Ohio)
- Michigan Avenue (Chicago)
- Plaza Frontenac (St. Louis, Missouri)
- North Star Mall (San Antonio, Texas)
- Utica Square (Tulsa, Oklahoma)
- Fashion Show (Las Vegas)
- Biltmore Fashion Park (Phoenix)
- South Coast Plaza (Costa Mesa, California)
- The Gardens El Paseo (Palm Desert, California)

These locations will remain operating for now:

- Wilshire Blvd. (Beverly Hills, California)
- Greenwich Avenue (Greenwich, Connecticut)
- Town Center at Boca Raton (Boca Raton, Florida)
- Bal Harbour (Miami)
- Brickell (Miami)
- Dadeland (Miami)
- Waterside Shops (Naples, Florida)
- The Gardens Mall (Palm Beach Gardens, Florida)
- Phipps Plaza (Atlanta)
- Prudential Center Boylston Street (Boston)
- Somerset Collection (Troy, Michigan)
- Fifth Avenue (New York City)
- The Galleria Uptown/Westheimer Rd (Houston)
- University Town Center (Sarasota, Florida) (originally to close but will remain open after negotiations with Simon)

Other former locations

- The Mall at Short Hills, Short Hills, New Jersey
- The Shops at Riverside, Hackensack, New Jersey
- Springfield/Millburn Avenue, Springfield, New Jersey

== International expansions ==
=== Canada ===
Canada expansion plans were drafted with the acquisition by HBC in 2013, calling for up to seven Saks stores across the country, of which three eventually opened. In February 2016, it opened a 150,000 sq ft (14,000 m^{2}) Saks Fifth Avenue in downtown Toronto, in a section carved out of the building housing the flagship of its namesake department store, Hudson's Bay Company, connected by sky bridge to the largest downtown mall, Eaton Centre. A second Greater Toronto location opened at Sherway Gardens shortly thereafter. And in February 2018, its third Canadian store opened in Calgary at Chinook Centre.

On March 14, 2025, shortly after the bankruptcy and collapse of Hudson's Bay, the company announced that it would liquidate and shuttering two of the three Saks Fifth Avenue locations in Canada and all 13 Saks Off 5th locations in Canada. Liquidation sales are set to begin as soon as the following week, with locations to be permanently shuttered by June 2025. The Calgary store also eventually shut down.

=== India ===
A franchise agreement was signed with Reliance Industries in early 2025 to open Saks Fifth Avenue and Saks Off 5th stores in India.

=== Mexico ===
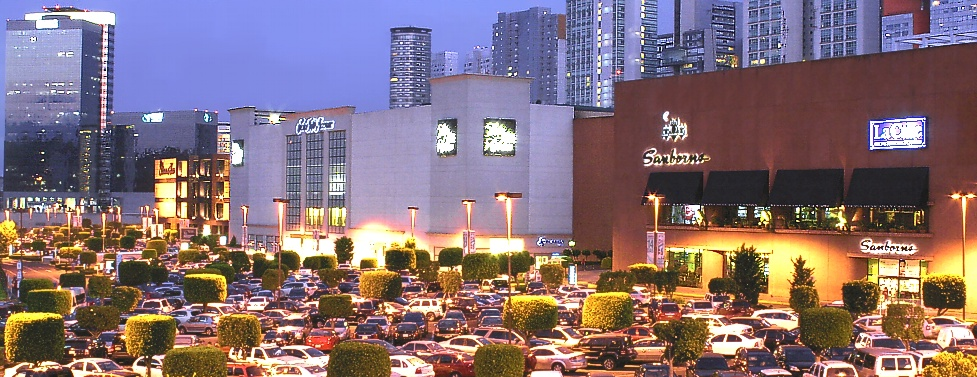
Saks Fifth Avenue in Santa Fe Mall in Mexico City

In November 2007, Grupo Sanborns, part of billionaire Carlos Slim's corporate empire, secured a franchise and opened the first Saks store in Mexico, on the affluent far west side of Mexico City at Centro Santa Fe, that country's largest mall. The store closed in 2022. Another store opened in the affluent urban neighborhood of Polanco at Plaza Carso in 2010, but it closed in October 2020.

In August 2023, Grupo Sanborns announced that in 2023, it would close its Saks franchise store at Centro Santa Fe in Mexico City, the only store still operating in Mexico after the closure of the Polanco store two years earlier. A branch of Sears Mexico, also part of Grupo Sanborns, was to replace it, and staff were to be retained.

=== Middle East ===
In November 2001 the first Middle East Saks opened at Kingdom Centre in Riyadh, Saudi Arabia. The store closed in 2012. In 2003 plans for stores in Bahrain, Kuwait, Qatar and the United Arab Emirates were announced following the signing of licensing agreements, along with plans for 5 to 10 stores across Japan. Saks was also looking at sites in Bahrain and Beirut for new stores. In 2012, the Riyadh franchise store, owned by Prince Al Waleed bin Talal Al Saud, closed after the licensing agreement expired.

In 2005, Saks opened a 80,000 square foot store at the BurJuman Centre in Dubai which closed in 2016; the store was Saks last store in the UAE after failed attempts at expansion. The store was originally scheduled to open in early 2004. A Doha store was scheduled to open in 2005 at Landmark Mall however plans never came to fruition. A Tokyo store was also planned to open in 2005.

In 2008, Saks opened its third Middle East store at City Centre Bahrain in Manama, Bahrain. The store has two floors and is 57,000 square feet (5,300 m^{2}) in size. After closing Riyadh and its 2 Dubai stores, it remained Saks' sole store in the Middle East. On 18 December 2025, the Bahrain store closed ending Saks presence in the Middle East.

In 2012, Saks licensed its first store in Central Asia, in Almaty, Kazakhstan, at the then-new Esentai Mall, together with boutiques of international luxury brands. Saks Almaty is 3 floors tall and 91,000 square feet (8,500 m^{2}) in size. In 2022, the licensing agreement with VILED was renewed through to 2032.

== Controversies ==
In 2005, vendors filed against Saks alleging unlawful chargebacks. The U.S. Securities and Exchange Commission (SEC) investigated the complaint for years and, according to The New York Times, "exposed a tangle of illicit tactics that let Saks... keep money it owed to clothing makers", inflating Saks' yearly earnings up to 43% and abusively collecting around $30 million from suppliers over seven years. Saks settled with the SEC in 2007, after dismissing three or more executives involved in the fraudulent activities.

In 2014, Saks fired transgender employee Leyth Jamal after she was allegedly "belittled by coworkers, forced to use the men's room and repeatedly referred to by male pronouns (he and him)". After Jamal submitted a lawsuit for unfair dismissal, the company stated in a motion to dismiss that "it is well settled that transsexuals are not protected by Title VII of the Civil Rights Act of 1964." In a court filing, the United States Department of Justice rebuked Saks' argument, stating that "discrimination against an individual based on gender identity is discrimination because of sex." The Human Rights Campaign removed the company from its list of "allies" during the controversy. The lawsuit was settled out of court with undisclosed terms.

In 2017, following the events of Hurricane Maria in Puerto Rico, Saks's San Juan store in Mall of San Juan suffered major damages along with its neighboring anchor store Nordstrom. Taubman Centers, owner of the mall, filed a lawsuit against Saks for failing to provide an estimated reopening date and failing to restore damages after the hurricane due to a binding contract. Although Nordstrom reopened on November 9, 2018, Saks Fifth Avenue vacated The Mall of San Juan after two years of litigation.

== Notable locations ==
=== Saks–34th Street ===
Saks-34th Street was a fashion-focused middle market department store at 1293-1311 Broadway on Herald Square. The building, built in 1902, had seven stories and was designed by Buchman & Fox. The store was spun off from Saks & Company when that upscale retailer moved to Fifth Avenue, a location that Saks Fifth Avenue maintains to this day. The newly renamed Saks-34th Street was sold to Bernard F. Gimbel, and became a part of the New York division of Gimbels (later Manhattan Mall), and a sky bridge across 33rd Street connected the second floors of both flagship buildings. In the 1947 movie Miracle on 34th Street, the facade of Saks-34th Street is shown in a scene that focuses on the Gimbel's flagship store. The store closed in 1965, citing poor layouts, no escalators, a confused identity, and outdated facade. After Gimbels closed the division, the first floor of the building was used as a Christmas season annex for Gimbel's before being sold to the E. J. Korvette chain. The building was remodeled into the Herald Center in 1985. As of 2016, the primary tenant is H&M, following another remodel.

=== Beverly Hills ===
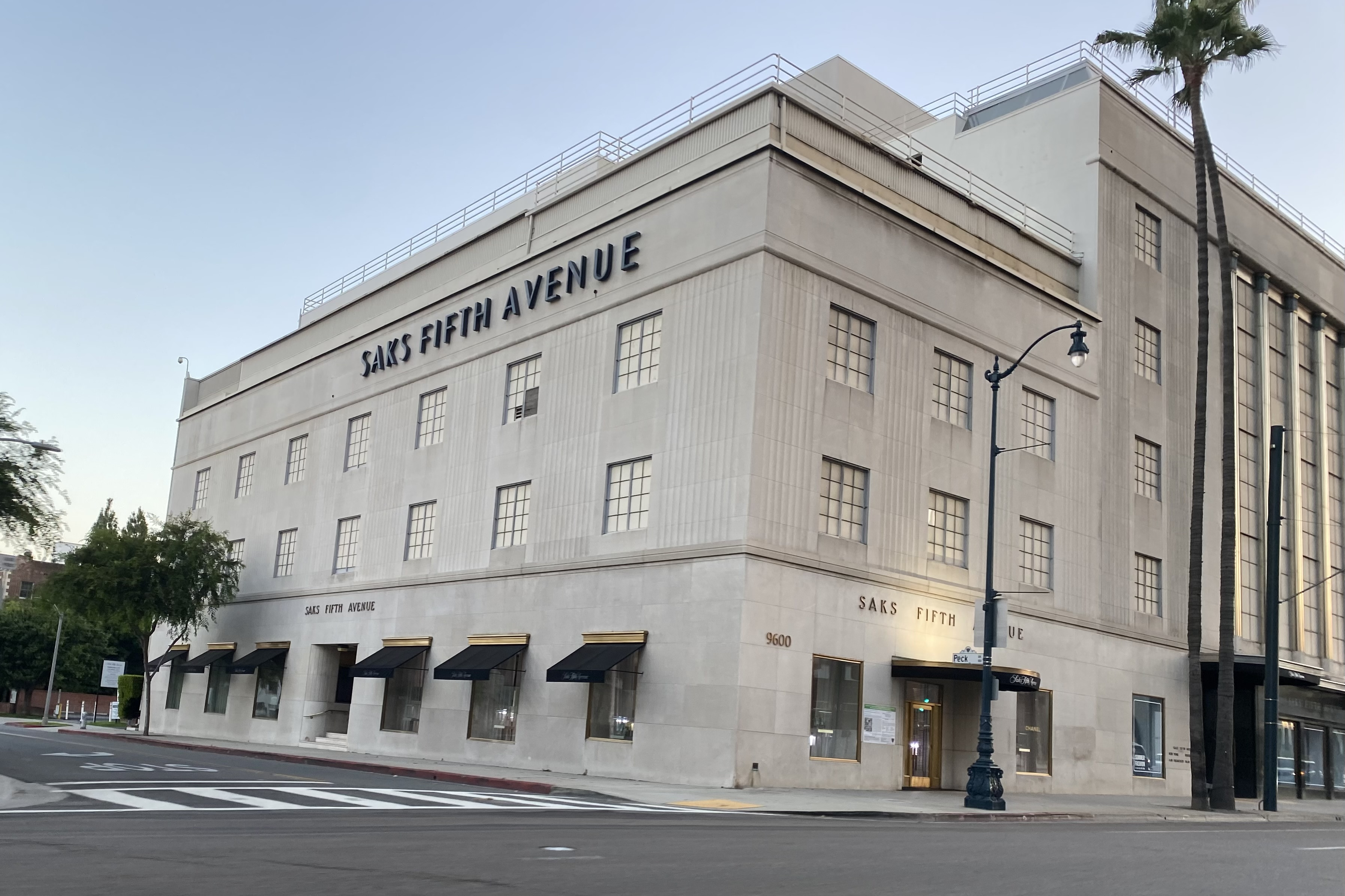
The original Saks Fifth Avenue store in Beverly Hills (2023)

The original Saks Fifth Avenue store in Beverly Hills, California, at 9600 Wilshire Boulevard, was designed by the architectural firm Parkinson and Parkinson, with interiors by Paul R. Williams. The store opened in 1938. The store saw success upon opening and subsequently expanded to almost 74,000 square feet (6,900 m^{2}) and employ 500 people. Williams created an interior reminiscent of his designs for luxurious private residences, with rooms lit by indirect lamps and footlights focused on the clothes. New departments for furs, corsets, gifts and debutante dresses were added in the 1940 expansion.

The store relocated to the adjacent 9570 Wilshire Boulevard in 2024, and the original location will be converted into a mixed-use development by Hudson's Bay Company.

== Saks Off 5th ==
Saks Off 5th logo

Saks Fifth Avenue opened its first Saks Off 5th clearance store in 1990. It evolved into an off-price department store chain in its own right, which as of 2023 operated 98 off-price stores across 22 U.S. states and 4 Canadian provinces.

Saks Off 5th expanded to Germany and the Netherlands in 2017 with one store in Germany and two in the Netherlands at launch. However the stores in both countries (eight in Germany and two in the Netherlands) were closed in 2019 alongside Hudson's Bay leaving the Netherlands. In February 2020, HBC announced that former Nordstrom Rack executive Paige Thomas was the new president of Saks Off 5th.

All 13 Saks Off 5th locations in Canada closed by June 2025, shortly after the bankruptcy and collapse of Hudson's Bay. Following its bankruptcy in January 2026, Saks Global announced the closure of 57 Saks Off 5th stores and the final five Neiman Marcus Last Call stores. 12 Saks Off 5th locations will remain as clearance centers for Saks Fifth Avenue, Neiman Marcus, and Bergdorf Goodman, with the off-price merchandising team dissolved.

== Gallery ==
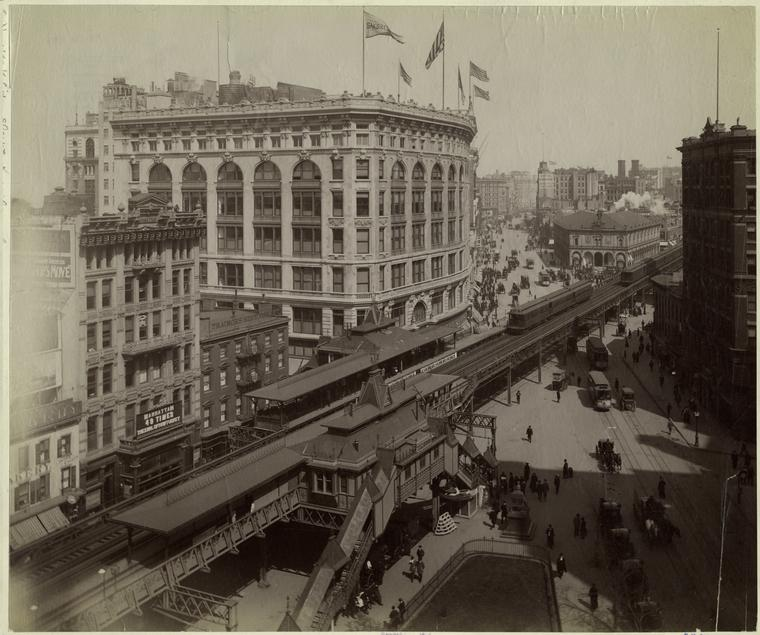
The Herald Square Saks & Co. store in 1903, behind the 33rd Street station

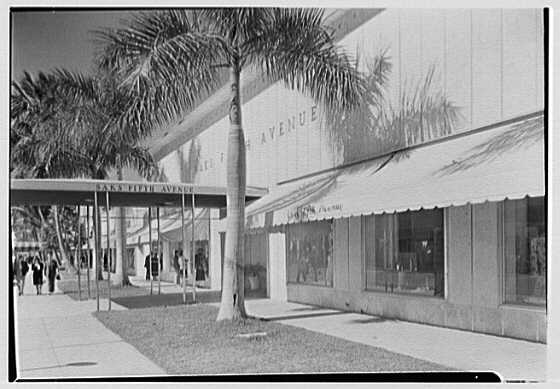
Saks Miami Beach on Lincoln Road (1940)

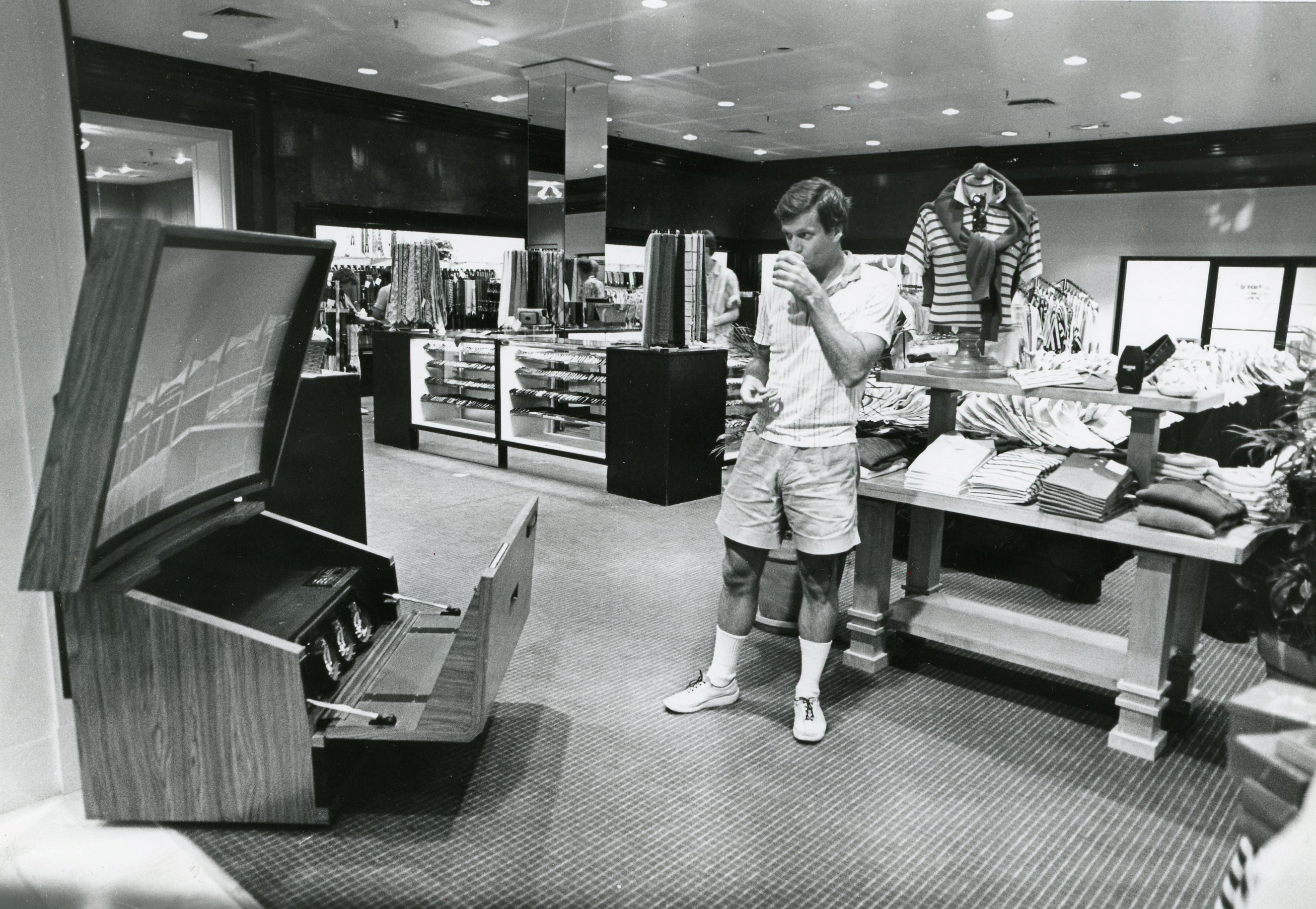
Sports-themed displays at Saks Houston (1987)

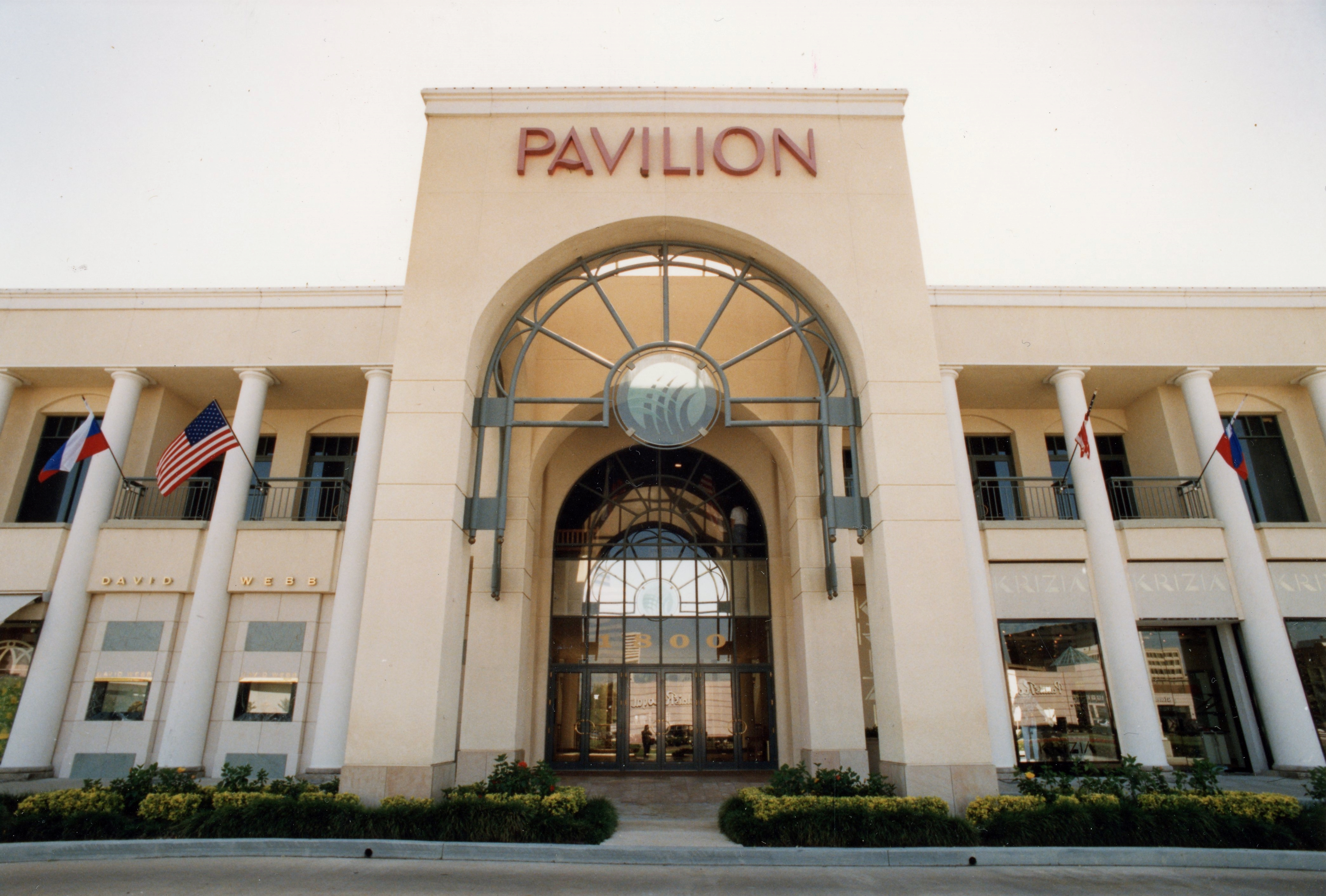
Former Saks Pavilion in Houston (1992)

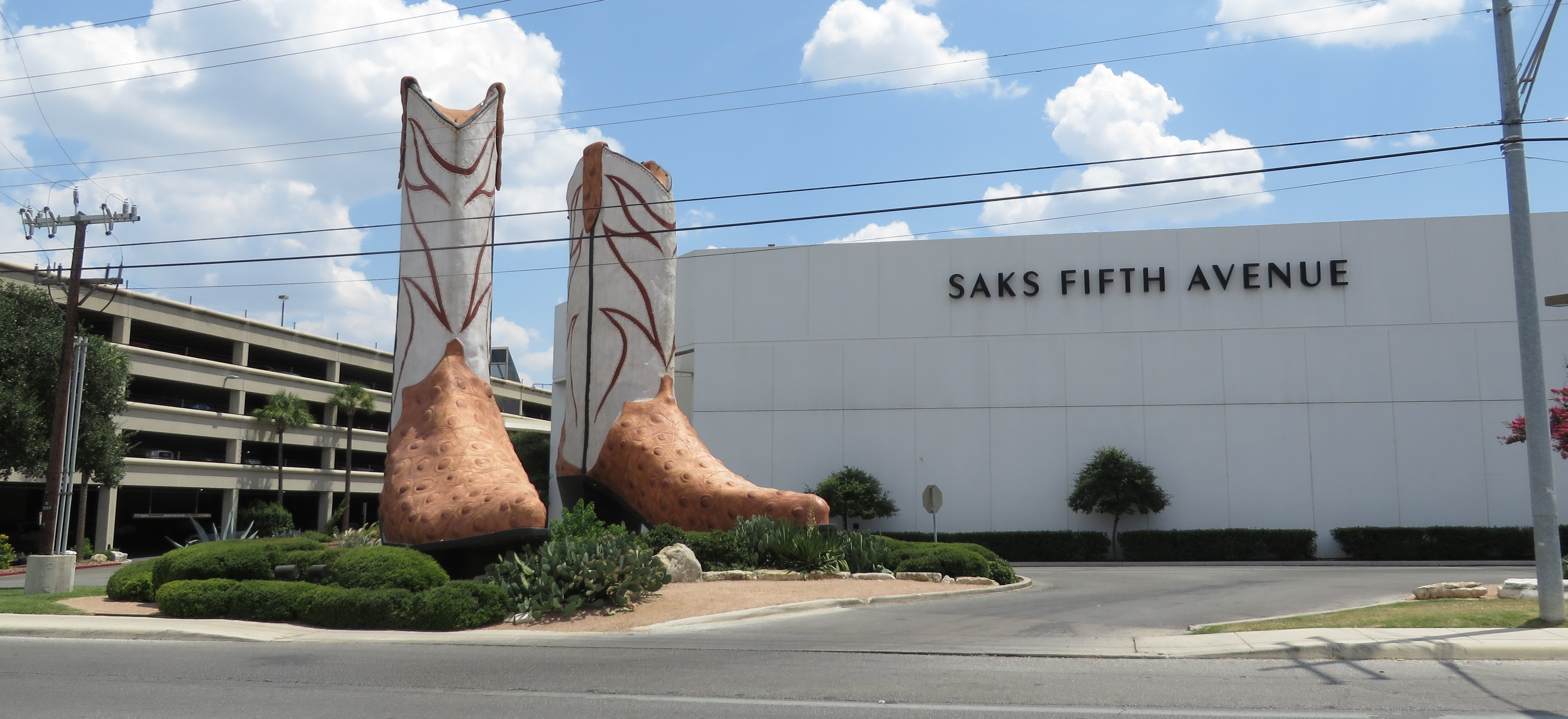
Saks at the North Star Mall in San Antonio, Texas

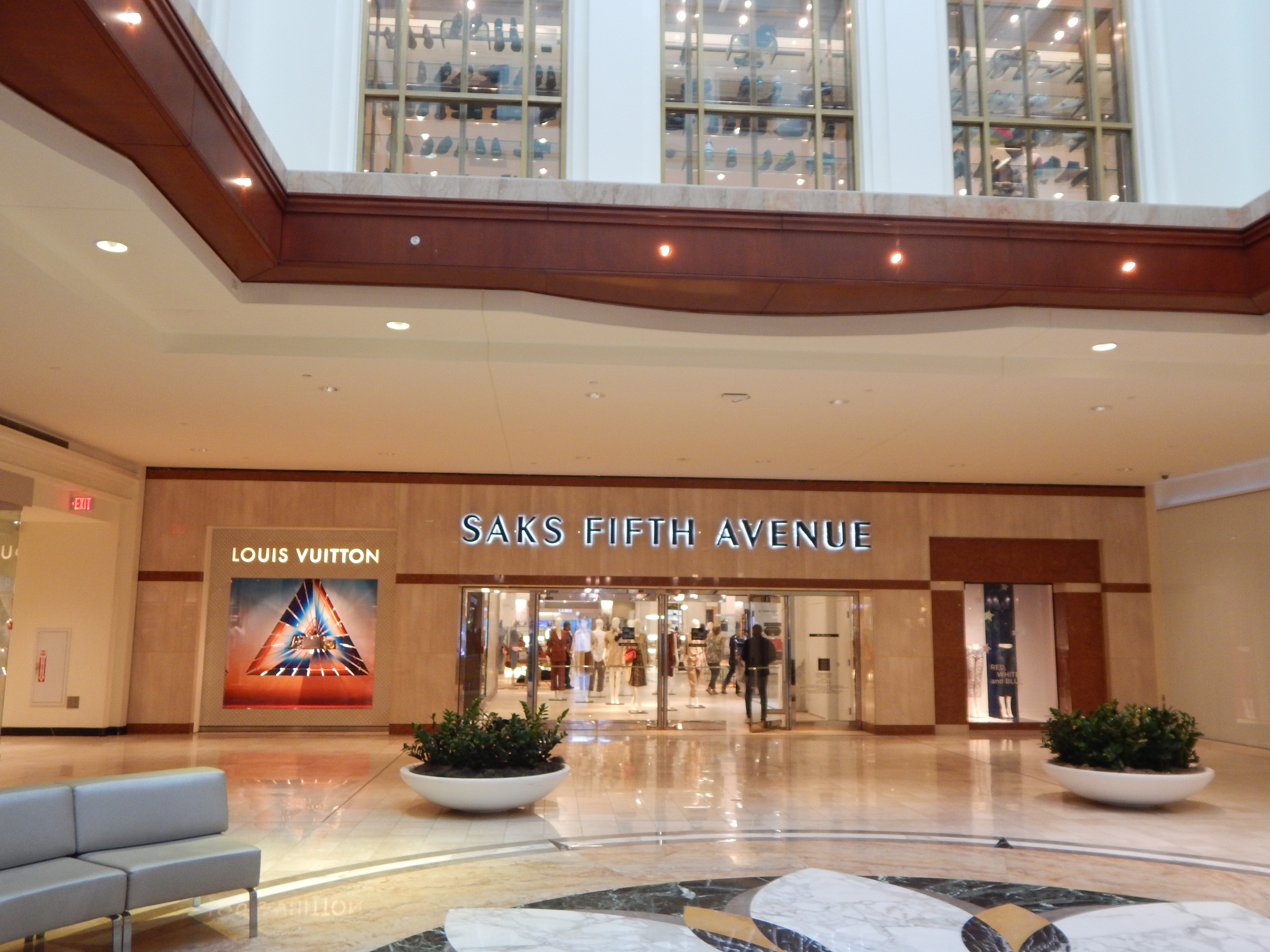
Saks Fifth Avenue at Phipps Plaza in Atlanta

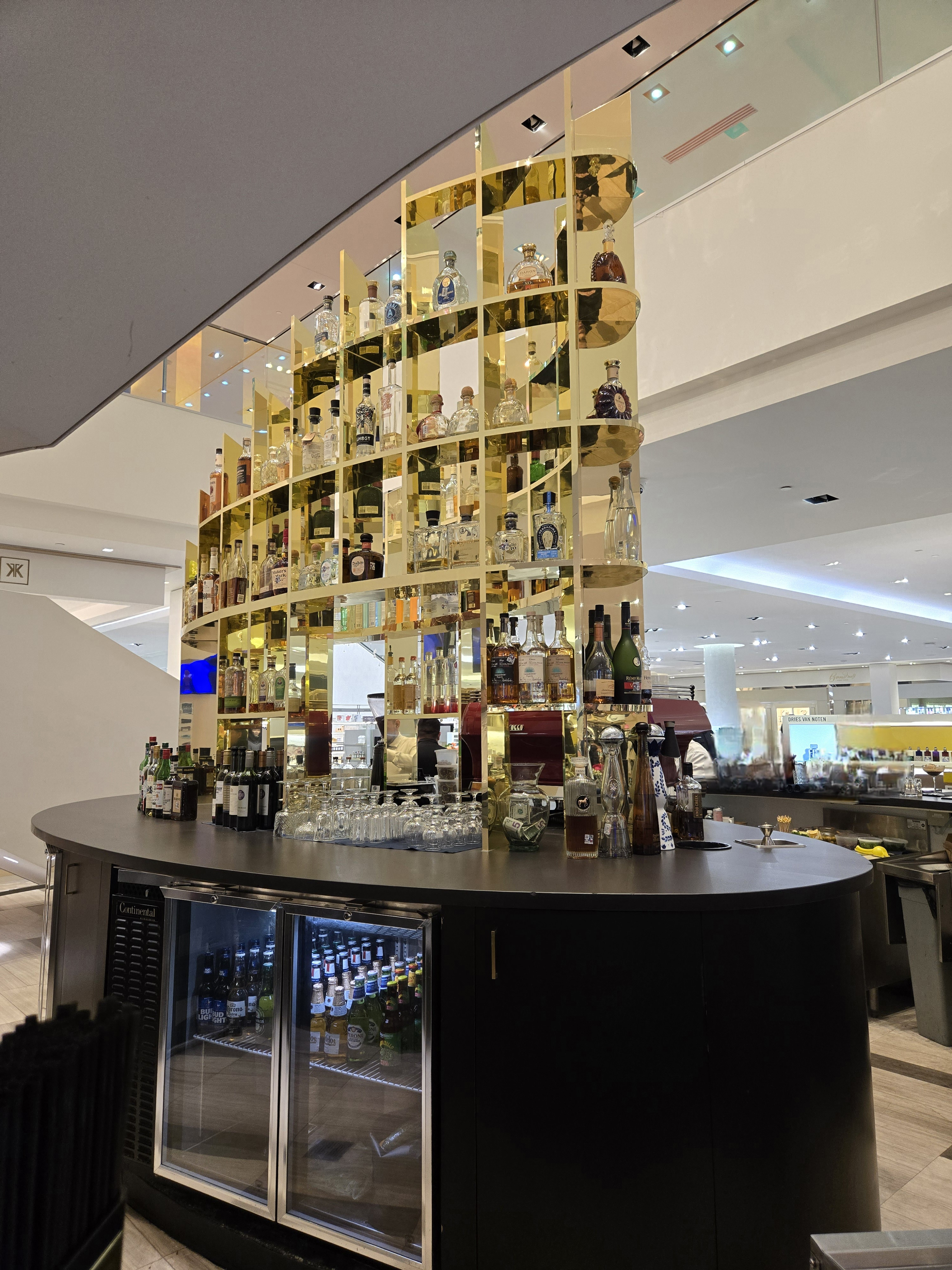
Bar in Saks Fifth Avenue Houston in the Galleria in Houston

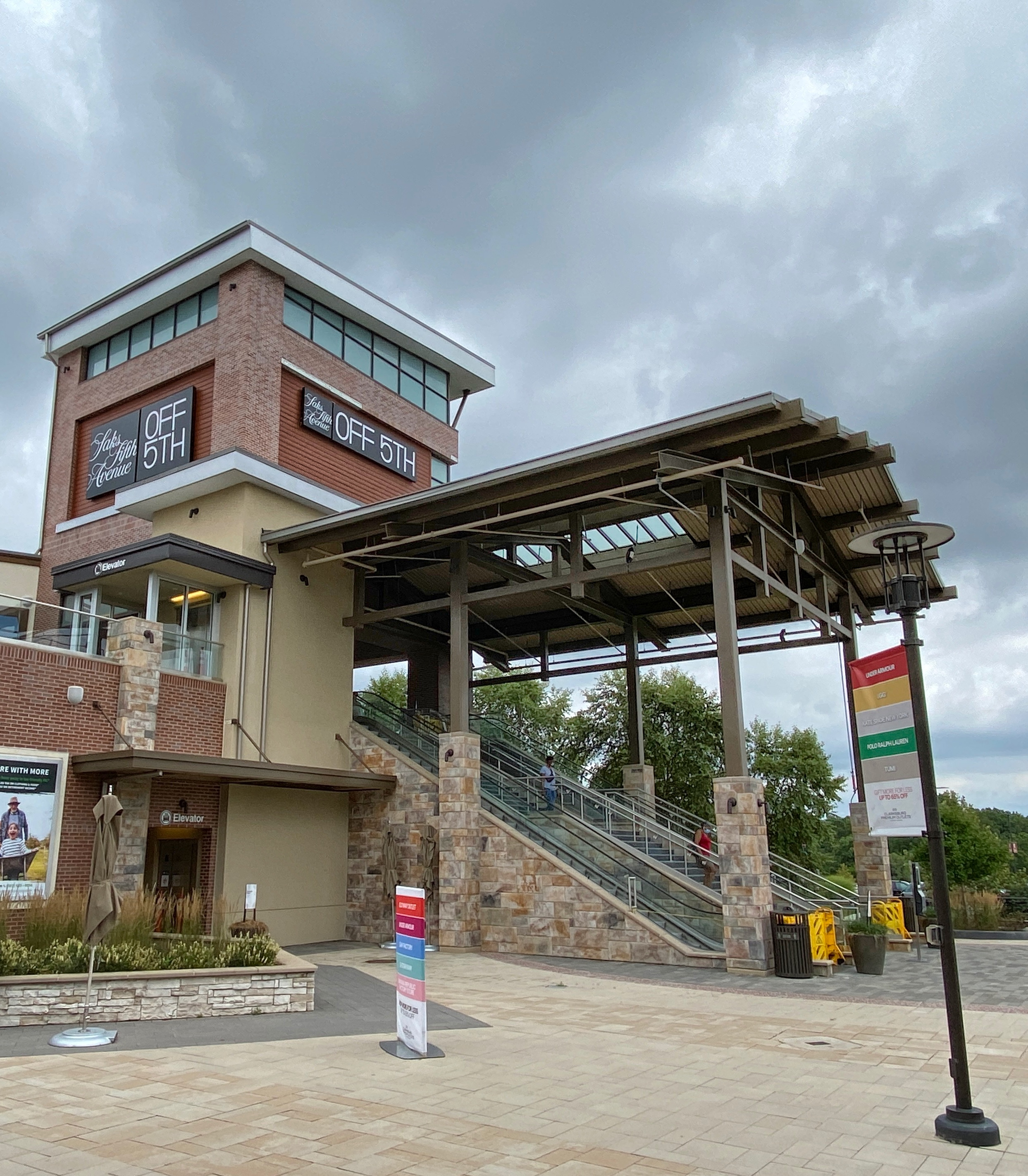
The exterior of the Saks OFF 5TH store in Clarksburg, Maryland (2020)
