= Mardi Gras (Cézanne) =

Painting by Paul Cézanne

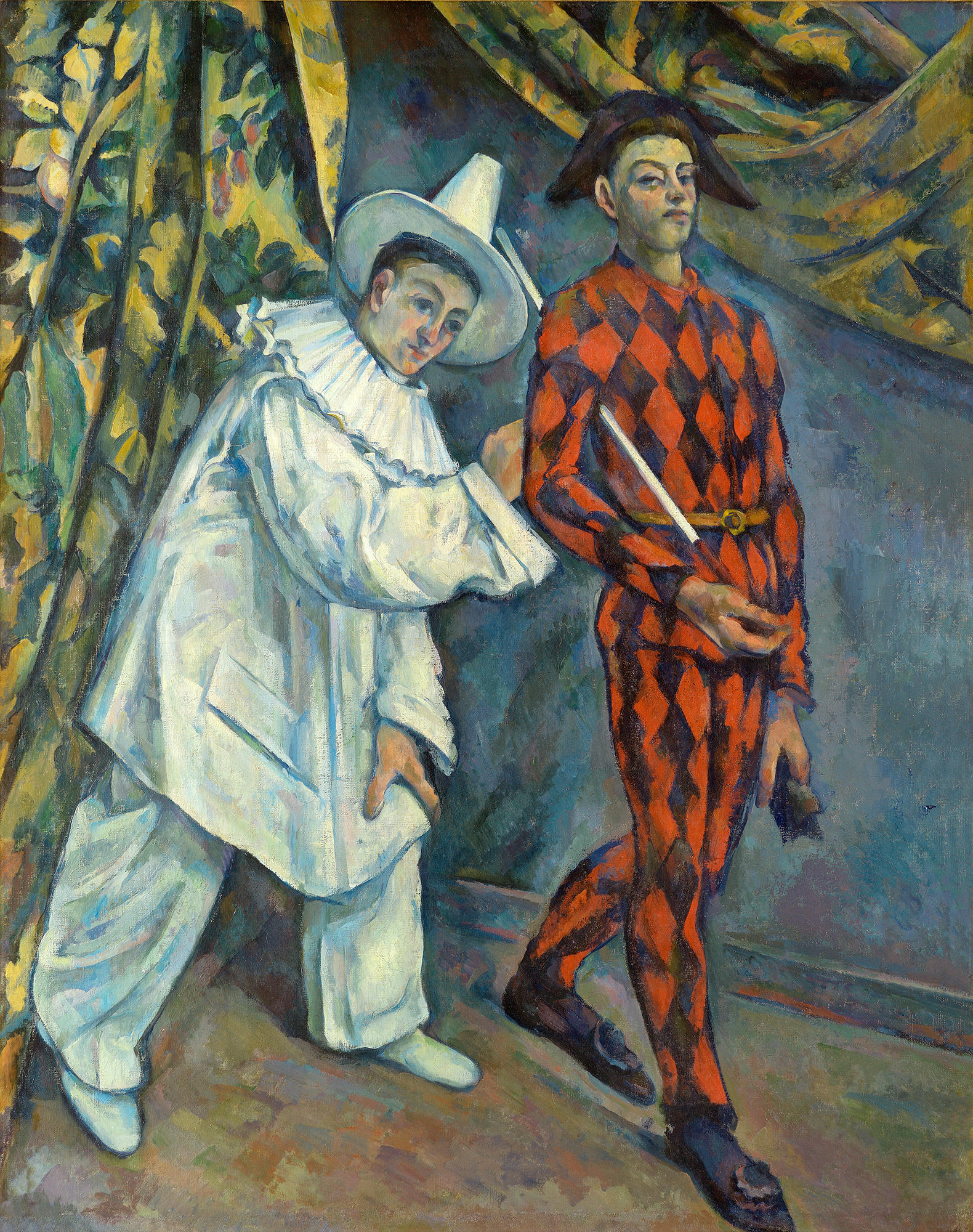
- Artist: Paul Cézanne
- Year: 1888
- Medium: Oil on canvas
- Dimensions: 102 cm × 81 cm (40 in × 32 in)
- Location: Pushkin Museum, Moscow

Mardi Gras, also known as Pierrot and Harlequin, is an oil on canvas painting by French artist Paul Cézanne, from 1888. The painting depicts two figures dressed as characters from the Italian commedia dell'arte. It is held at the Pushkin Museum, in Moscow.

== History ==
Pierrot and Harlequin are traditional characters from the Italian commedia dell'arte. Cézanne used his son Paul and his friend Louis Guillaume as models for both of them. The white figure of Pierrot appears as if made of plaster. Harlequin’s red and black stockings symbolize the flames of glowing embers. The contrasting arrangement of the colored curtains on the right and left emphasizes Harlequin’s forward movement, in contrast to Pierrot’s more static position.

Mardi Gras was painted in 1888, during a period when Cézanne explored subjects associated with the commedia dell'arte. He produced several paintings and drawings of Harlequin between 1888 and 1890.

The painting originally belonged to French art collector Victor Chocquet. It later passed through the Durand-Ruel gallery before being acquired by Russian collector Sergei Shchukin in 1904.

Following the nationalization of Shchukin's collection in 1918, the painting entered the collections of several museums in Moscow. It was transferred to the Pushkin Museum in 1948, where it remains.

== See also ==
- List of paintings by Paul Cézanne
