= Arles: View from the Wheat Fields =

1888 painting by Vincent van Gogh

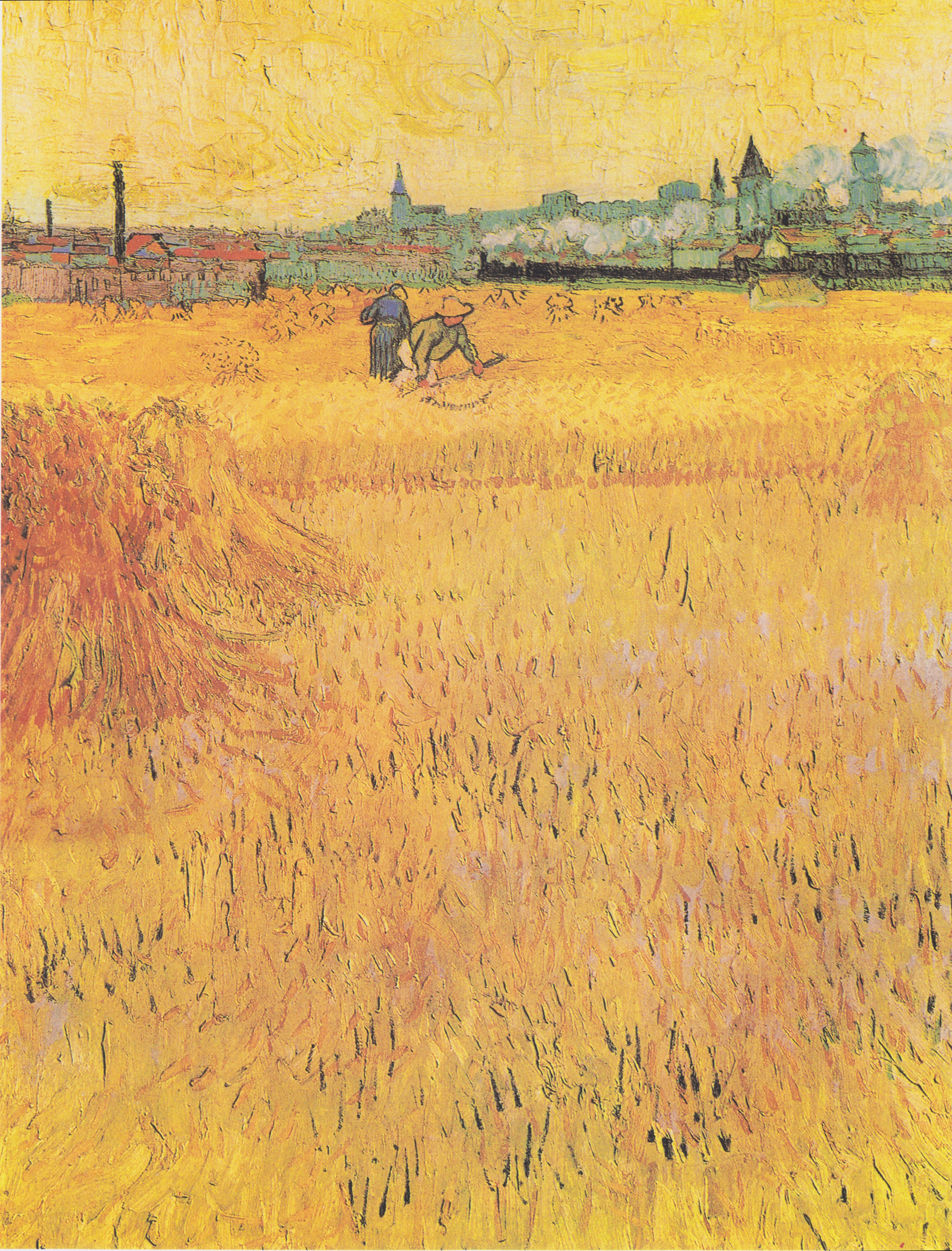
- Artist: Vincent van Gogh
- Year: June 1888
- Medium: oil on canvas
- Dimensions: 73 cm × 54 cm (29 in × 21 in)
- Location: Musée Rodin (F545); Paris

Arles: View from the Wheat Fields (also known as Wheat Field with Sheaves and Arles in the Background) was painted by Vincent van Gogh in June 1888, among a number of paintings he made of wheat fields that summer. It is currently displayed at the Musee Rodin in Paris, France.

== Arles ==
Van Gogh was about 35 years of age when he moved to Arles in southern France. There he was at the height of his career, producing some of his best work. His paintings represented different aspects of ordinary life, such as Harvest at La Crau. The sunflower paintings, some of the most recognizable of Van Gogh's paintings, were created in this time. He worked continuously to keep up with his ideas for paintings. This was also likely one of Van Gogh's happier periods of life. He was confident, clear-minded and seemingly content.

His work during this period represents a culmination of influences, such as Impressionism, Neo-Impressionism and Japanese art (see Japonism) from his period in Paris the prior two years. His style evolved into one with vivid colors and energetic, impasto brush strokes.

== Wheat fields ==
The close association of peasants and the cycles of nature particularly interested Van Gogh, such as the sowing of seeds, harvest and sheaves of wheat in the fields. Van Gogh saw plowing, sowing and harvesting symbolic to man's efforts to overwhelm the cycles of nature: "the sower and the wheat sheaf stood for eternity, and the reaper and his scythe for irrevocable death." The dark hours conducive to germination and regeneration are depicted in The Sower and wheat fields at sunset.

In 1889 Van Gogh wrote of the way in which wheat was symbolic to him: "What can a person do when he thinks of all the things he cannot understand, but look at the fields of wheat... We, who live by bread, are we not ourselves very much like wheat... to be reaped when we are ripe."

== Harvest paintings ==
During the last half of June he worked on a group of ten "Harvest" paintings, which allowed him to experiment with color and technique. "I have now spent a week working hard in the wheatfields, under the blazing sun," Van Gogh wrote on 21 June 1888 to his brother Theo.

== Painting description ==
Arles: View from the Wheat Fields represents the harvest. In the foreground are sheaves of harvested wheat leaning against one another. The center of the painting depicts the harvesting process, a couple at work in a sea of yellow and ochre. Across the horizon is the town of Arles. Van Gogh described the series of wheat fields as "…landscapes, yellow—old gold—done quickly, quickly, quickly, and in a hurry just like the harvester who is silent under the blazing sun, intent only on the reaping." Van Gogh used landscape-format for all of his Wheat Fields paintings, the one exception was this painting which was made in portrait-format.

== See also ==
- List of works by Vincent van Gogh
