= Imperial Fritillaries in a Copper Vase =

1887 painting by Vincent van Gogh

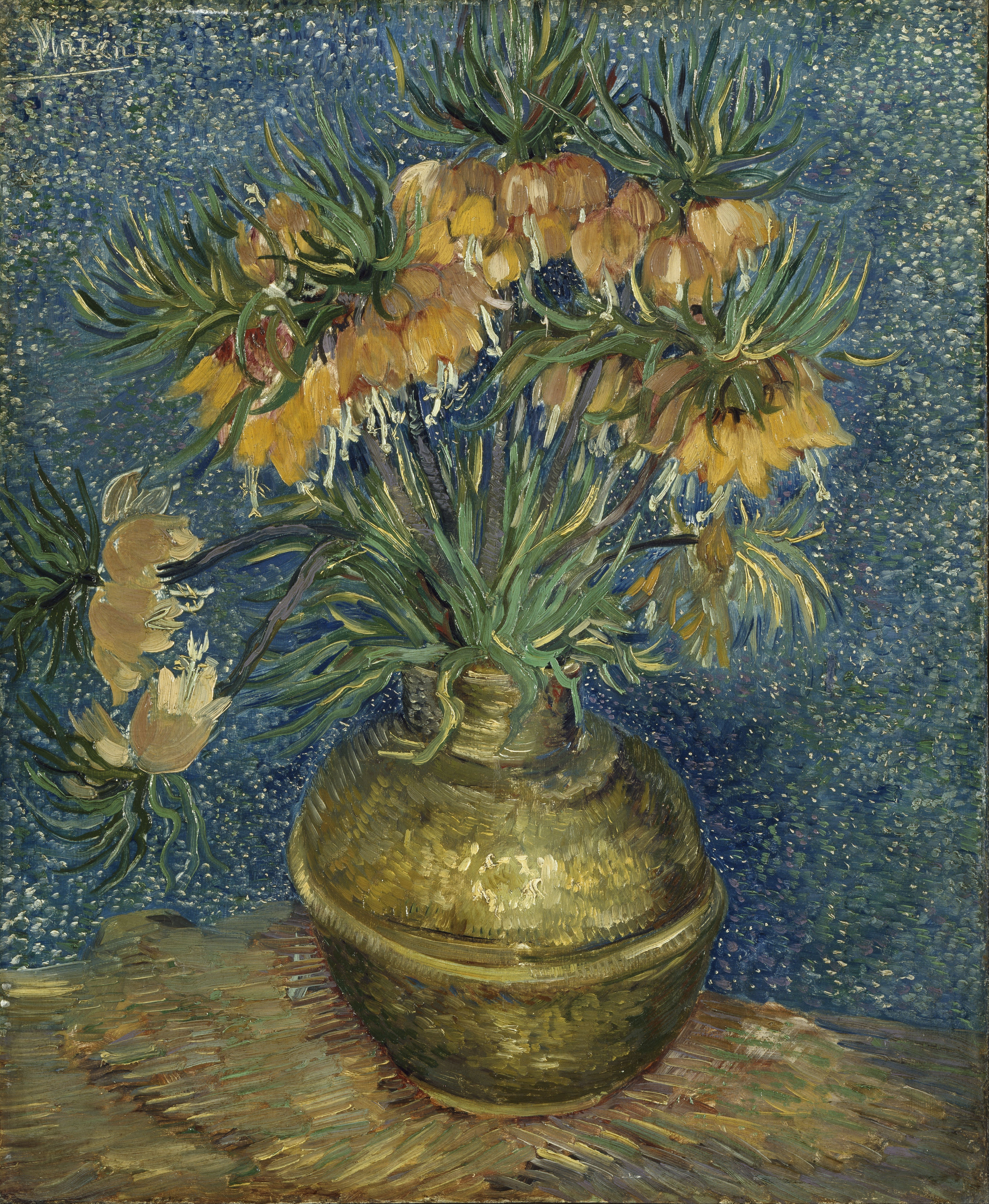
- Artist: Vincent van Gogh
- Year: 1887
- Catalogue: F213; JH1247
- Medium: Oil on canvas
- Dimensions: 73.5 cm × 60.5 cm (28.9 in × 23.8 in)
- Location: Musée d'Orsay, Paris

Imperial Fritillaries in a Copper Vase is an oil painting on canvas created by the Post-Impressionist painter Vincent van Gogh in Paris, 1887. The painting is now part of the collection of the Musée d'Orsay in Paris, France. This work was made at a time of the life of van Gogh when he first encountered influences from Impressionists and became aware of light and color, implementing it in his paintings. This painting presages some of his most famous subsequent works, and stands out from other still lifes because of the implementation of mixed techniques and complementary colors.

== Description ==
Imperial Fritillaries in a Copper Vase is an oil painting on canvas measuring 73.5 by 60.5 cm which was painted in Paris in 1887. It depicts a bouquet of golden imperial fritillaries in a copper vase, the shiny patina of which (surrounded by lavender highlights) "reflects the color of the flowers as the motted wall stands out with a combination of blue, green and yellow shades" with flecks of white like "sparkling lights." The "moody blues" and "vibrant golds" in the painting can also be appreciated in other of van Gogh's works such as The Starry Night and Bedroom in Arles. This painting with its "thickly applied paint and convoluted brushstrokes" presages van Gogh´s famous Sunflowers. Color was an important element in his work at the time it was painted, as it expresses the artist´s "elevated mood" during the period he lived with his brother Theo in Montmartre in Paris (1886-1888). This piece has been described as a "riotous celebration of color, texture and light," as it shows how van Gogh accomplished light and the varied ways in which he applied the paint with "dashes in the background, directional brushstrokes on the table, impasto highlights on the metal vase".

Vincent, as mentioned by the Scottish painter, Archibald Standish Hartrick, was interested in a theory that stated that "the eye carried a portion of the last sensation it had enjoyed into the next, so that something of both must be included in every picture made". The inspiration for the selection of complementary colors (orange and blue in this painting), came from noticing that "when entering a lamplit room out of the night increases the orange effect of the light, and in the contrary case, the blue." As Vincent wrote, he tried to "render intense colour and not a grey harmony." Eugène Murer, the Impressionist painter contemporaneous with van Gogh who owned the Fritillaries in a Copper Vase painting, considered him "the greatest colorist of the century after Renoir." Van Gogh was always open minded about trying new painting techniques and even liked to use several in a same work. This painting is an example of this, as it mixes Pointillism in the background as "expression of the nature of the central focus of the painting" and Impressionism in the brushstrokes of the flowers and vase. Van Gogh applied these techniques inspired by Impressionists and Neo-Impressionists of the time, that would be later used in other pieces, mainly portraits and self-portraits.

=== Signature ===
Out of 900 works, van Gogh signed only about 130, Imperial Fritillaries in a Copper Vase among them (upper left corner). This means that he considered it a potential work that could be sold. The signature in the picture reads "Vincent", as he signed since he arrived to Paris and from then on. It is said that this was because French people could not pronounce his last name. Another theory states that he wanted to get away from the van Gogh name as his ancestors were more conservative than him. He wanted to be recognized as an individual to be "unique".

== Imperial fritillaries ==
Imperial fritillaries (Fritillaria imperialis) are bulbs that were grown in France and Germany at the end of the 19th century, nowadays they are generally seen in gardens in Europe during spring (April and May). Because of this it is assumed that van Gogh painted this work at that time of year. The orange-red flower is also known as the imperial crown or kaiser's crown. Each bulb grows between three and ten flowers, so van Gogh used one or two bulbs to make the bouquet depicted in this picture.

== See also ==
- List of works by Vincent van Gogh
