= Victor Chocquet =

French art collector (1821–1891)

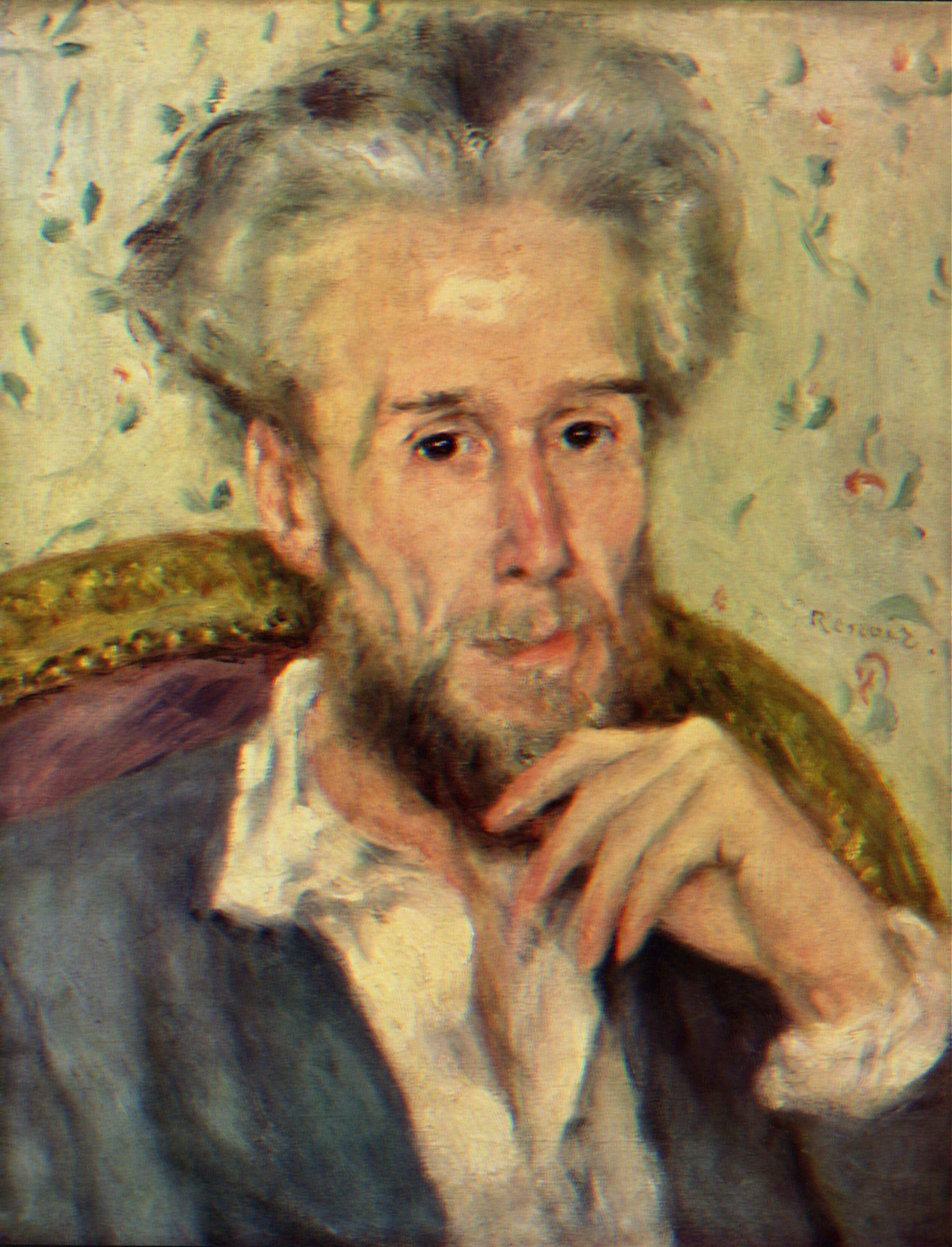
- Victor Chocquet, by Pierre-Auguste Renoir, 1876
- Born: 9 December 1821; Lille, France
- Died: 7 April 1891 (aged 69); Paris, France
- Occupations: Art collector, Civil servant
- Known for: Patron of the Impressionists; Early supporter of Renoir, Cézanne, Monet

Victor Chocquet (French pronunciation: [viktɔʁ ʃɔkɛ]; 9 December 1821 – 7 April 1891) was a French art collector and an ardent propagandist of Impressionism. As a senior editor at the Directorate-General of Customs and Indirect Taxes, he was present at all the exhibitions where he defended painters confronted with mockery and insults. His collection was huge. It was dispersed after his death in 1899. Many of the paintings are currently in American museums.

== Life ==
Chocquet was born in Lille in a wealthy family of silk millers. At a very young age, he devoted all his resources to the purchase of works of art: paintings (including those of Eugène Delacroix, Gustave Courbet, Honoré Daumier) porcelain, and furniture. In 1875, when he attended the 1875 Impressionist sale at the Hôtel Drouot, he fell in love with the paintings hooted by the audience. He asked Auguste Renoir to paint a portrait of his wife and their little daughter Marie-Sophie who died at the age of five, based on a photograph. During this first sale of the "Société anonyme des artistes" at the Hôtel Drouot on 24 March 1875, the painters' receipts did not cover their expenses, the average price of a painting amounting to 100 fr. That day he was one of the first supports of the artists with Ernest Hoschedé and Georges de Bellio.

Particularly enthusiastic about Paul Cézanne whose paintings he saw at Père Tanguy's home, he spent a lot of energy verbally defending the painters at the 1876 and 1877 exhibitions to which he lent works from his collection. Despite the quolibets that welcomed Cézanne's presentation of his own portrait and despite violent criticism from the press, he was not discouraged, even when his resources diminished when he took early retirement (1877). From 1882, his mother-in-law's inheritance allowed him to resume his purchases and he acquired a property in Hattenville (Normandy) where a large number of works, including Ferme à Hattenville, by Cézanne, were painted. His collection rivaled those of the greatest collectors: he was often quoted at the same time as Georges de Bellio and Eugène Murer in the press. He owned about 32 paintings by Cézanne.

In Paris, Victor Chocquet first lived in an apartment rue de Rivoli that overlooked the Tuileries Garden. It is from there that Monet painted several paintings, including Vue sur le jardin des Tuileries (1876). huile sur toile de 53.97 x 73.2. At the end of his life, he moved to a small 18th-century mansion house, rue Monsigny.

Chocquet died in Paris on 7 April 1891 at age 69.

== Portraits and paintings ==
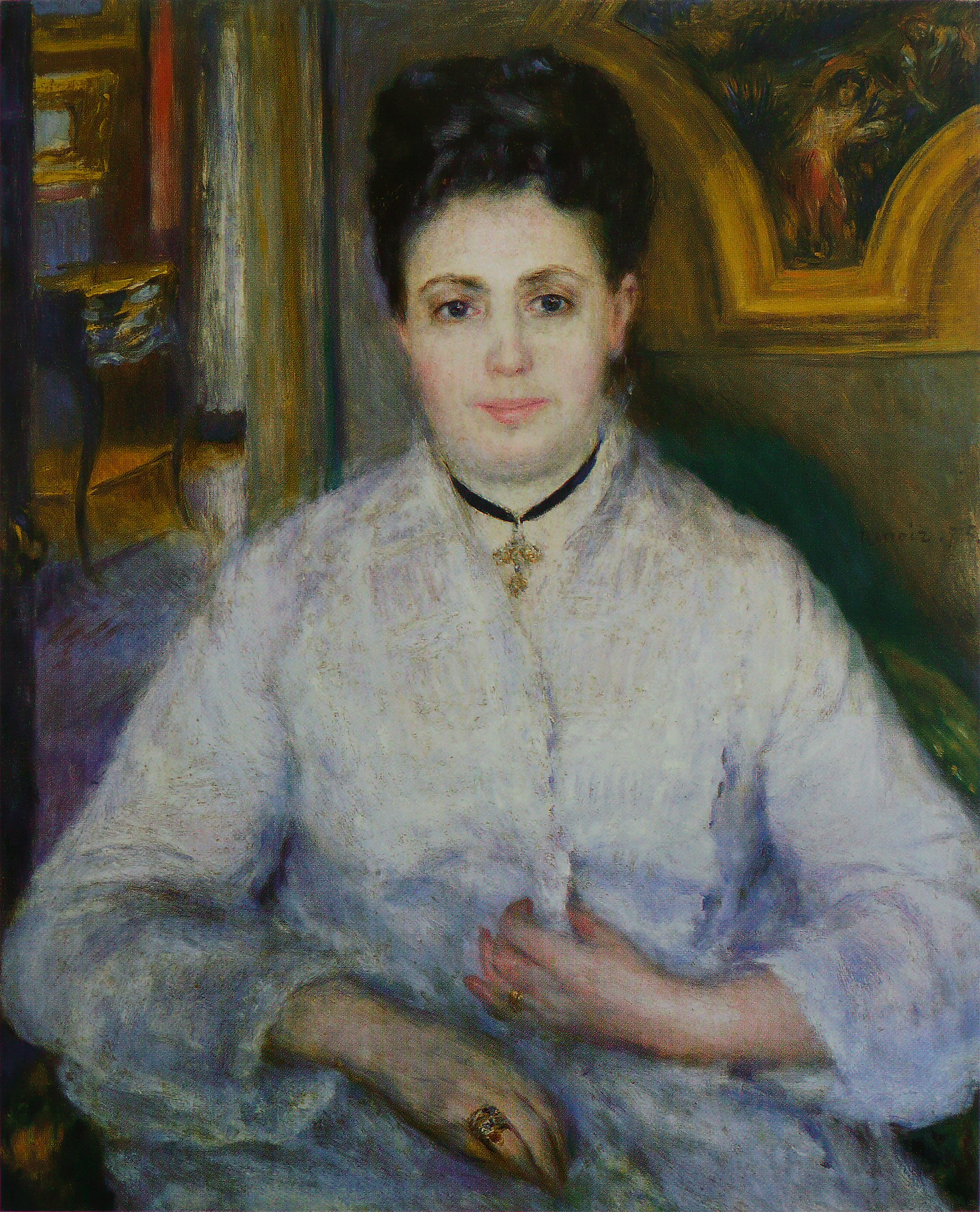
Madame Victor Chocquet by Pierre-Auguste Renoir, 1875, Staatsgalerie Stuttgart

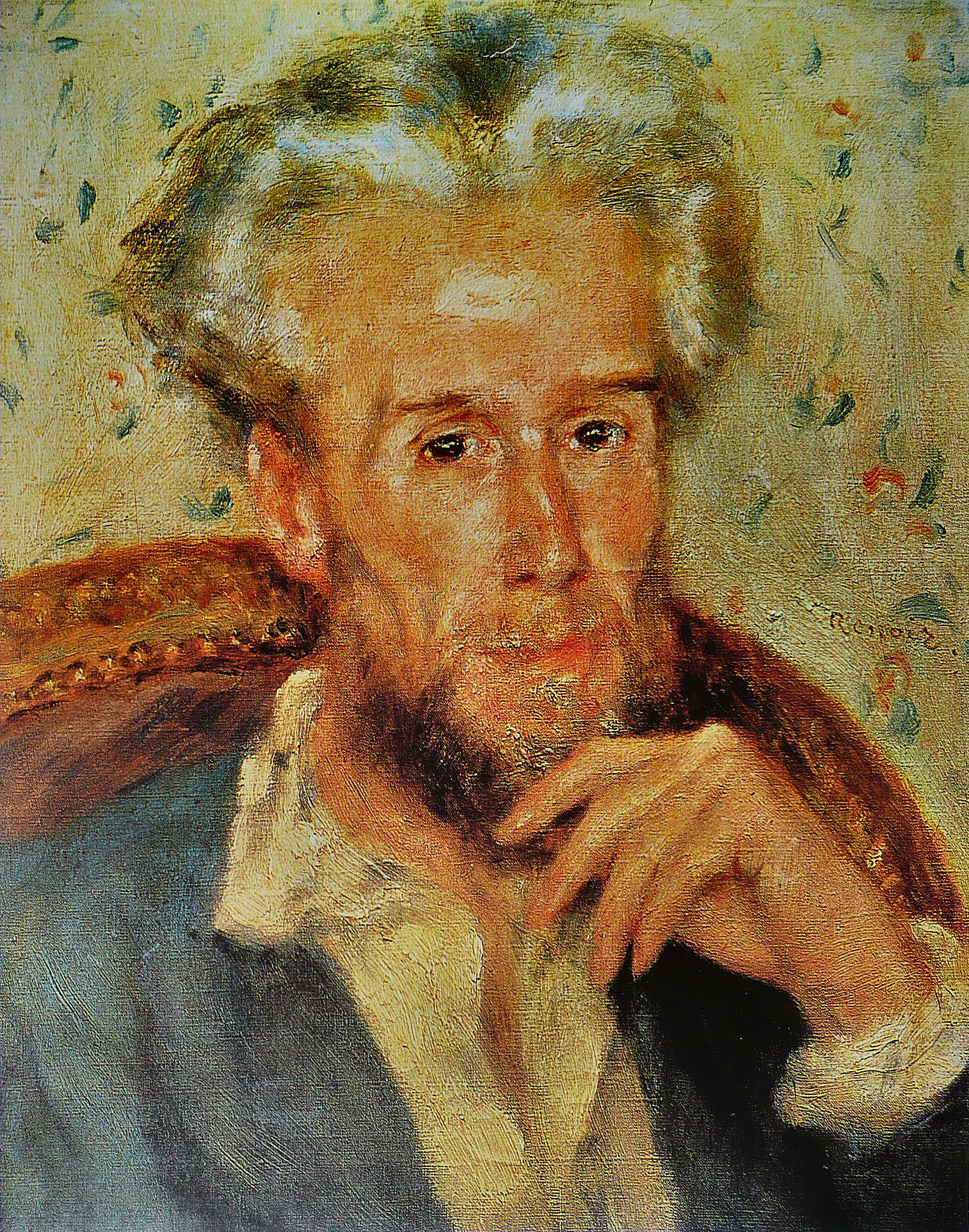
Pierre-Auguste Renoir, Portrait de Victor Chocquet 1876 Collection Oskar Reinhart Winterthour

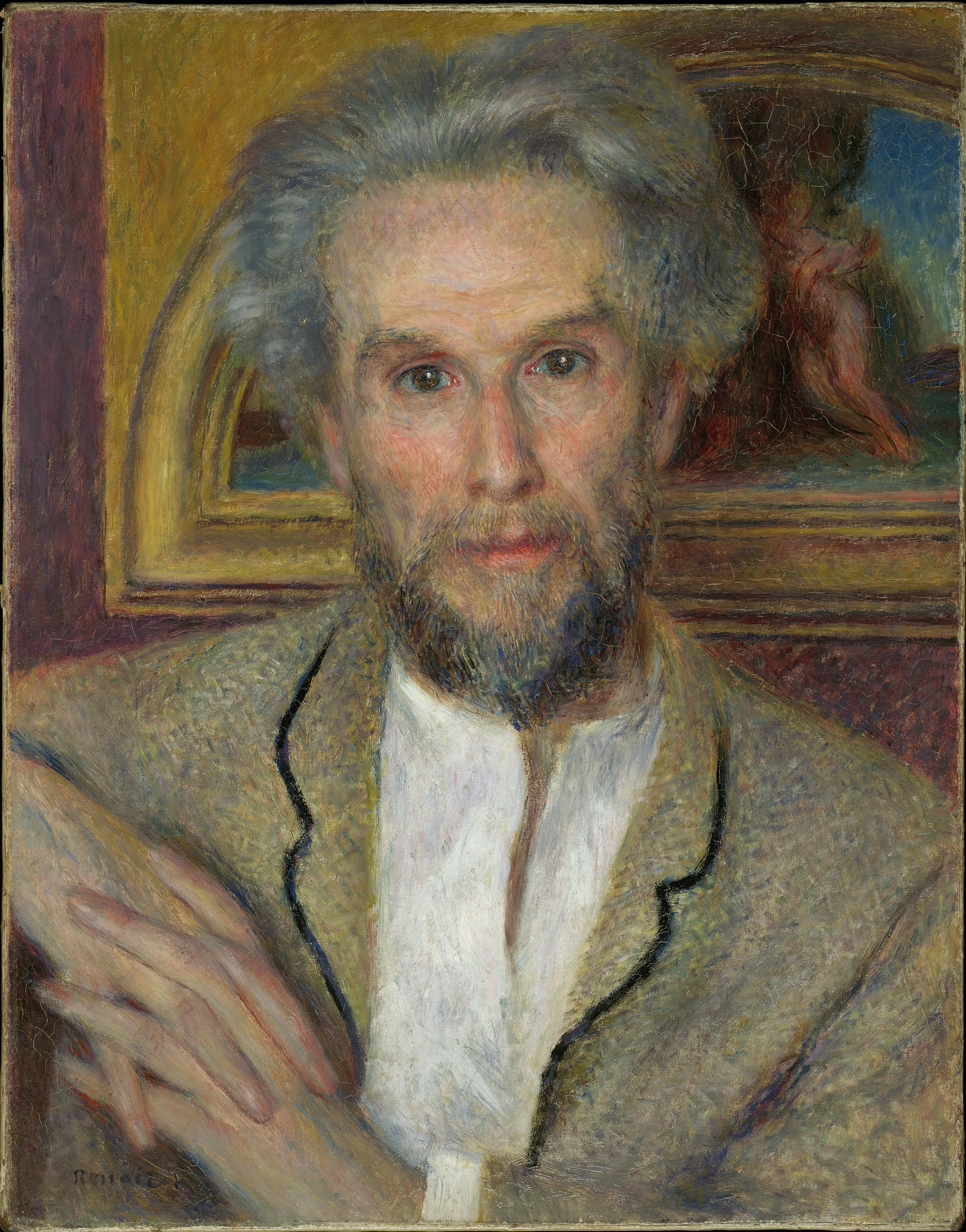
Pierre-Auguste Renoir, Portrait de Victor Chocquet 1876 Fogg Museum of Art Cambridge (Massachusetts)

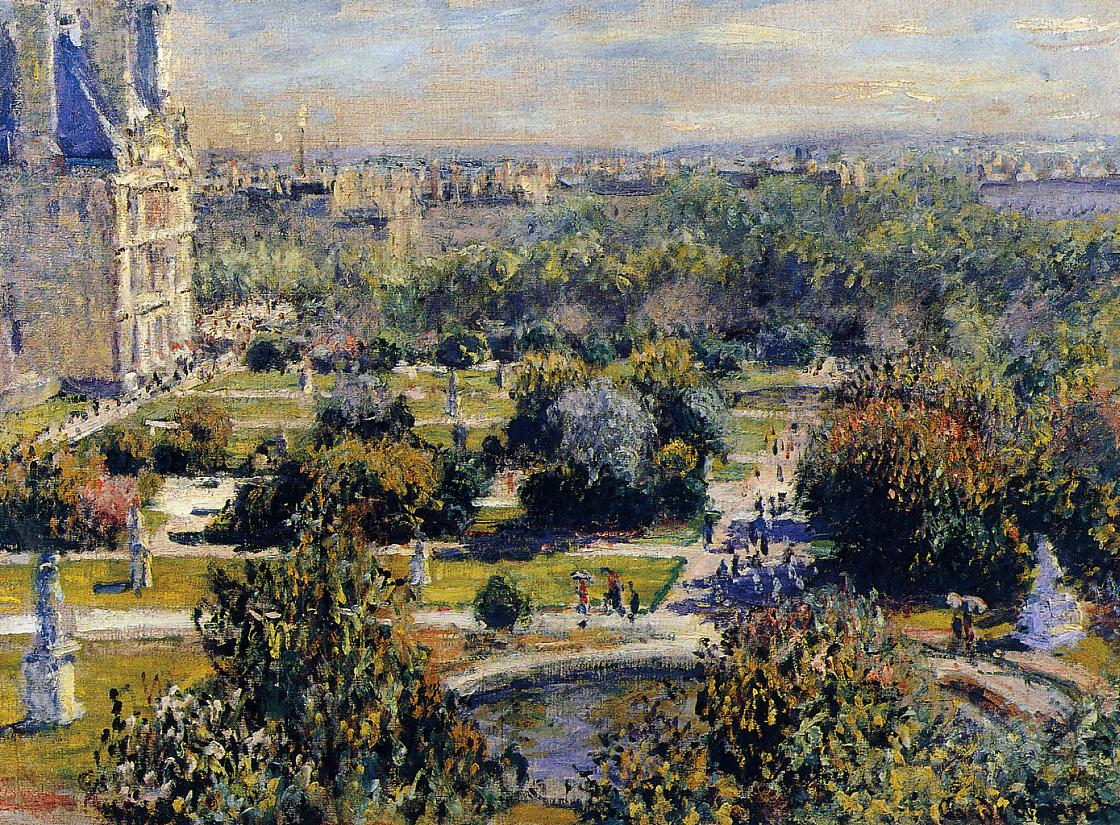
Claude Monet,Vue du jardin des Tuileries 1876, painted from Chocquet's apartment, rue de Rivoli, Musée Marmottan Monet

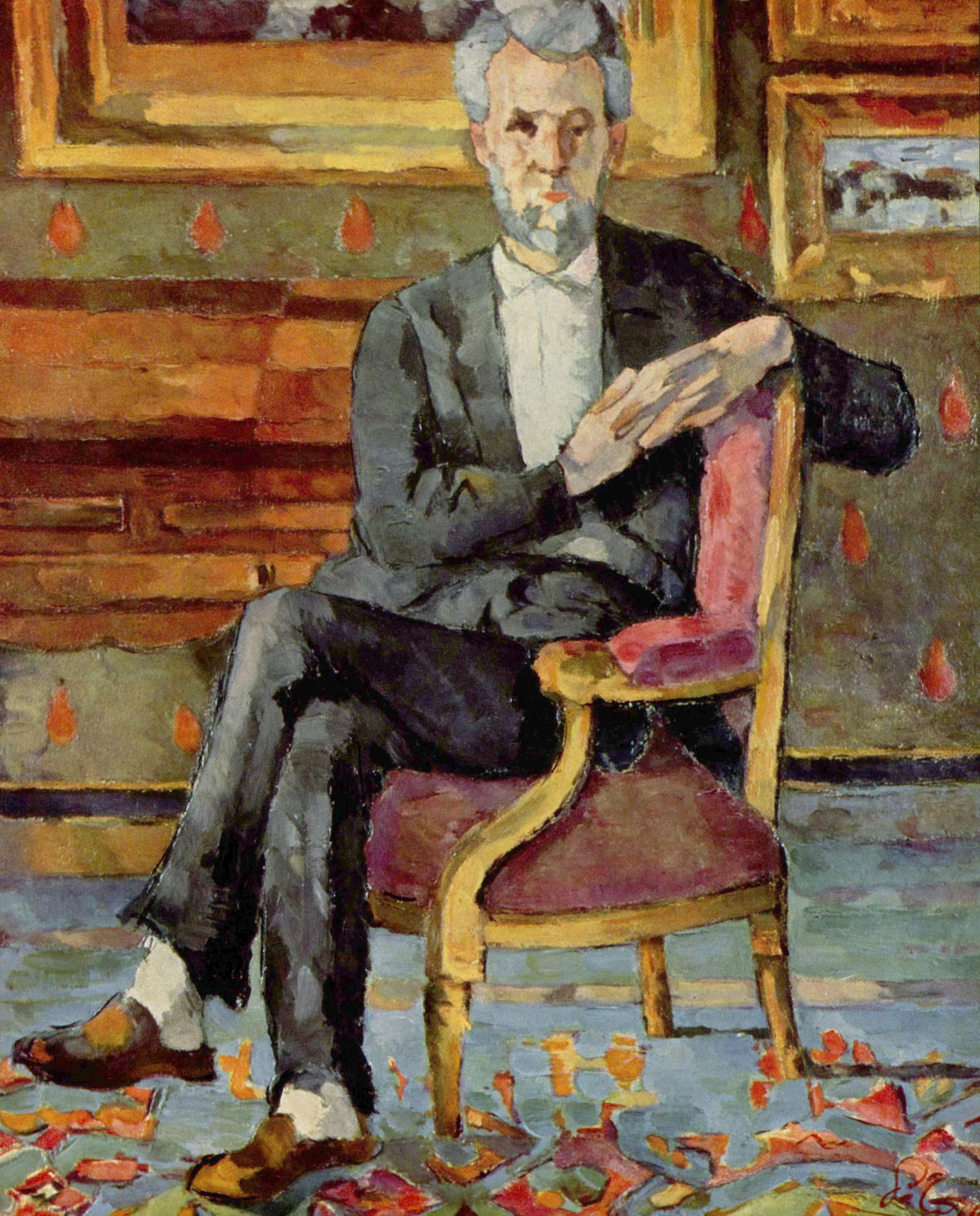
Paul Cézanne: Portrait de Victor Chocquet, (1877), Columbus Museum of Art, Columbus (Ohio)

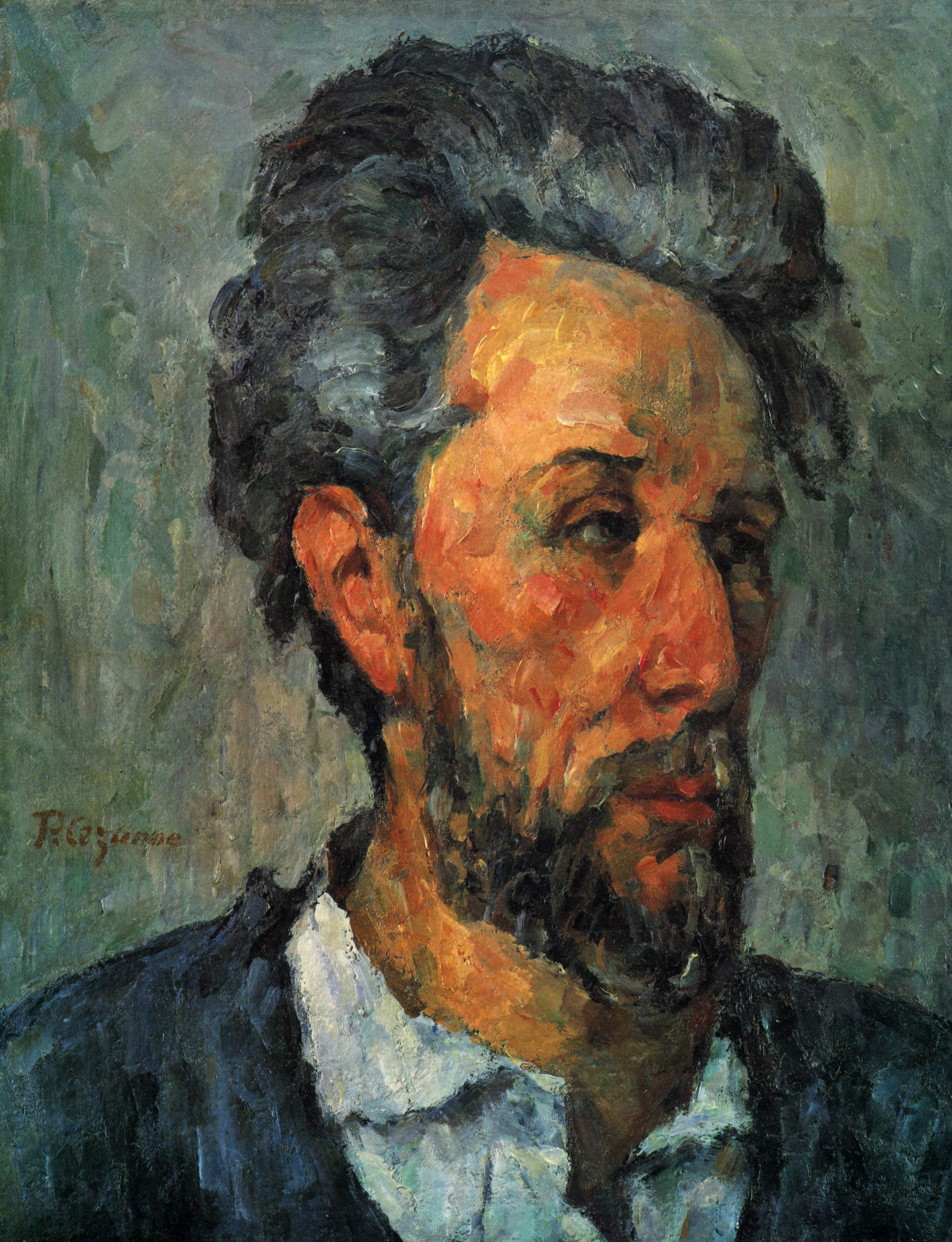
Cézanne: Portrait de Victor Chocquet (1875), oil on canvas, 45.7 x 36.8 cm, collection Lord Victor Rothschild, Cambridge (Massachusetts)

== Bibliography ==
- Collectif Meyon (2011). Art, Paris Impressionists & Post-Impressionists; the ultimate guide to artists, paintings and places in Paris and Normandy. New York: Museyon. ISBN 978-0982232095.
- Bailey, Colin B.; et al. (2009). Stein, Susan Alyson; Miller, Asher Ethan (eds.). The Annenberg Collection masterpieces of Impressionism and Post-Impressionism. New York: Metropolitan Museum of Art. pp. 108–114. ISBN 978-0300124026.
- Roe, Sue (2007). The Private Lives of the Impressionists. New York: Vintage Books. ISBN 978-0099458340.
- Monneret, Sophie (1987a). L'Impressionnisme et son époque (in French). Vol. 1. Paris: Robert Laffont. ISBN 978-2-221-05412-3.
- Monneret, Sophie (1987b). L'Impressionnisme et son époque (in French). Vol. 2. Paris: Robert Laffont. ISBN 978-2-221-05413-0.
