= Portrait of Père Tanguy =

Painting by Vincent van Gogh

Portrait of Père Tanguy, final version
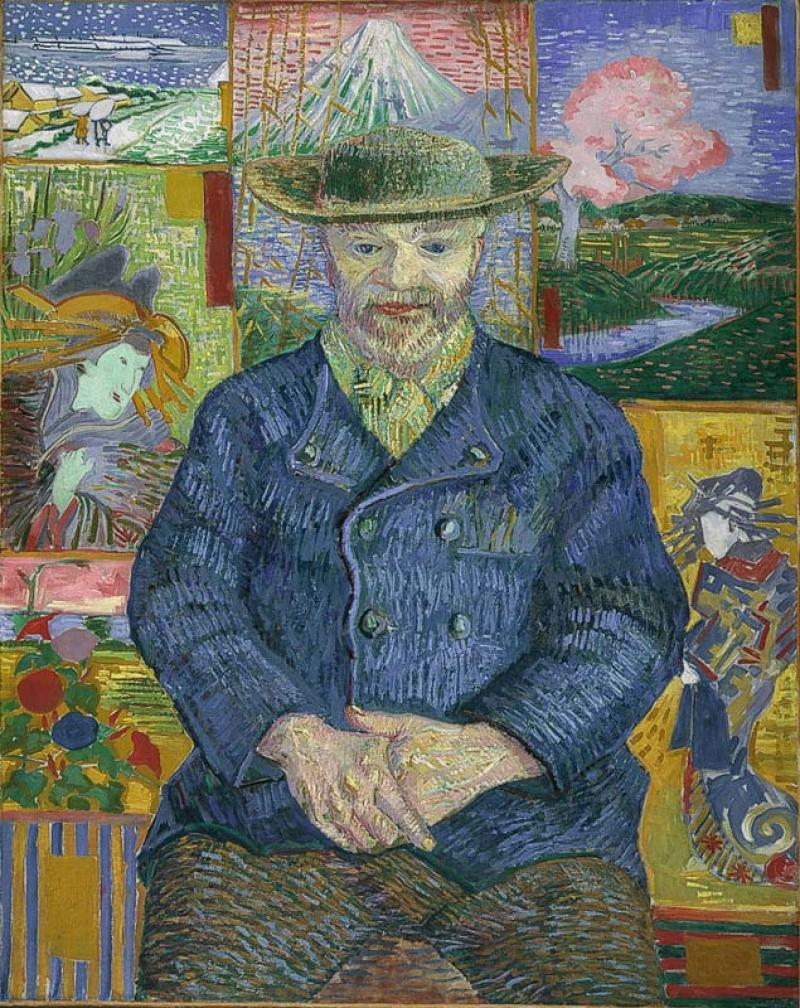
- Artist: Vincent van Gogh
- Year: 1887
- Catalogue: F363; JH1351
- Medium: Oil on canvas
- Dimensions: 65.0 cm × 51.0 cm (25.6 in × 20.0 in)
- Location: Musée Rodin; Paris

Portrait of Père Tanguy, painted by Vincent van Gogh in 1887, is one of his three paintings of Julien Tanguy. The three works demonstrate a progression in van Gogh's artistic style after his arrival in Paris. The first is somber, and formed from a simple composition. The second introduces van Gogh's Japanese prints. The last and most advanced in style, skill and color integrates Japanese, Impressionist, and other influences on the Parisian artist community. This painting conveys a sense of serenity that van Gogh seeks for himself. This last painting of Tanguy is in the Musée Rodin, Paris.

== Van Gogh in Paris ==
In 1886 van Gogh left the Netherlands never to return. He moved to Paris to live with his brother Theo, a Parisian art dealer. Vincent entered Paris as a shy, somber man. While his personality would never change, he emerged artistically into what one critic described as a "singing bird". Although van Gogh had been influenced by great masters in the Netherlands, coming to Paris meant that he was exposed to Impressionists, Symbolists, Pointillists, and Japanese art (see Japonisme). His circle of friends included Camille Pissarro, Henri Toulouse-Lautrec, Paul Gauguin, Émile Bernard, Paul Signac, and others. The works of the Japanese ukiyo-e artists Hiroshige and Hokusai greatly influenced van Gogh, both for the subject matter and the style of flat patterns of colors without shadow. In the two years from 1886 through 1888 he spent working in Paris, van Gogh explored the various genres, creating his own unique style.

== The painting ==
The brightly colored painting and confident subject represent a shift in Vincent's attitude. Van Gogh called his use of bright colors "gymnastics" that through experimentation created great depth, harmony and balance in his work. The painting contains a background of van Gogh's Japanese prints that were sold at Tanguy's shop. On top of Tanguy's hat is Mount Fuji; Kabuki actors share the wall with cherry trees in bloom.

The Japanese paintings represent van Gogh's search for serenity, which he describes in a letter to his sister during this period, "Having as much of this serenity as possible, even though one knows little – nothing – for certain, is perhaps a better remedy for all diseases than all the things that are sold at the chemist's shop." In an effort to capture serenity in his painting, Van Gogh paints Tanguy with a calm, contemplative nature. Historian of Symbolism Naomi Maurer describes him as having the "iconic tranquility of Buddha."

Van Gogh died in 1890 and Tanguy four years after. Following Tanguy's death, his daughter sold the Portrait of Père Tanguy to sculptor Auguste Rodin. The Portrait of Père Tanguy, previously in Rodin's personal collection, is in the permanent collection at Musée Rodin in Paris.

== Julien Tanguy ==
Julien François Tanguy (1825 Plédran - 1894 Paris) was a paint grinder who sold art supplies and was also an art dealer, one of the first to offer van Gogh's paintings for sale. His jovial demeanor and enthusiasm for artistry and artists made his shop one of the most favored art supply shops in Paris, and he was nicknamed Père ("Father") Tanguy. Maurer calls Tanguy a father figure who shared his food and money with artists and showed their paintings with pride.

Tanguy took paintings as payment for paints, which Émile Bernard said made entering his shop in Montmartre, full of Impressionist paintings, like "visiting a museum". In comparison to her husband, Tanguy's wife was less cooperative and more concerned with clientele paying outstanding charges. When Tanguy died, his friends staged an auction for his widow.

Octave Mirbeau wrote a notice about him in L'Écho de Paris on 13 February 1894.

== Three Portraits of Julien Tanguy ==
Van Gogh painted three portraits of Julien (Père) Tanguy.

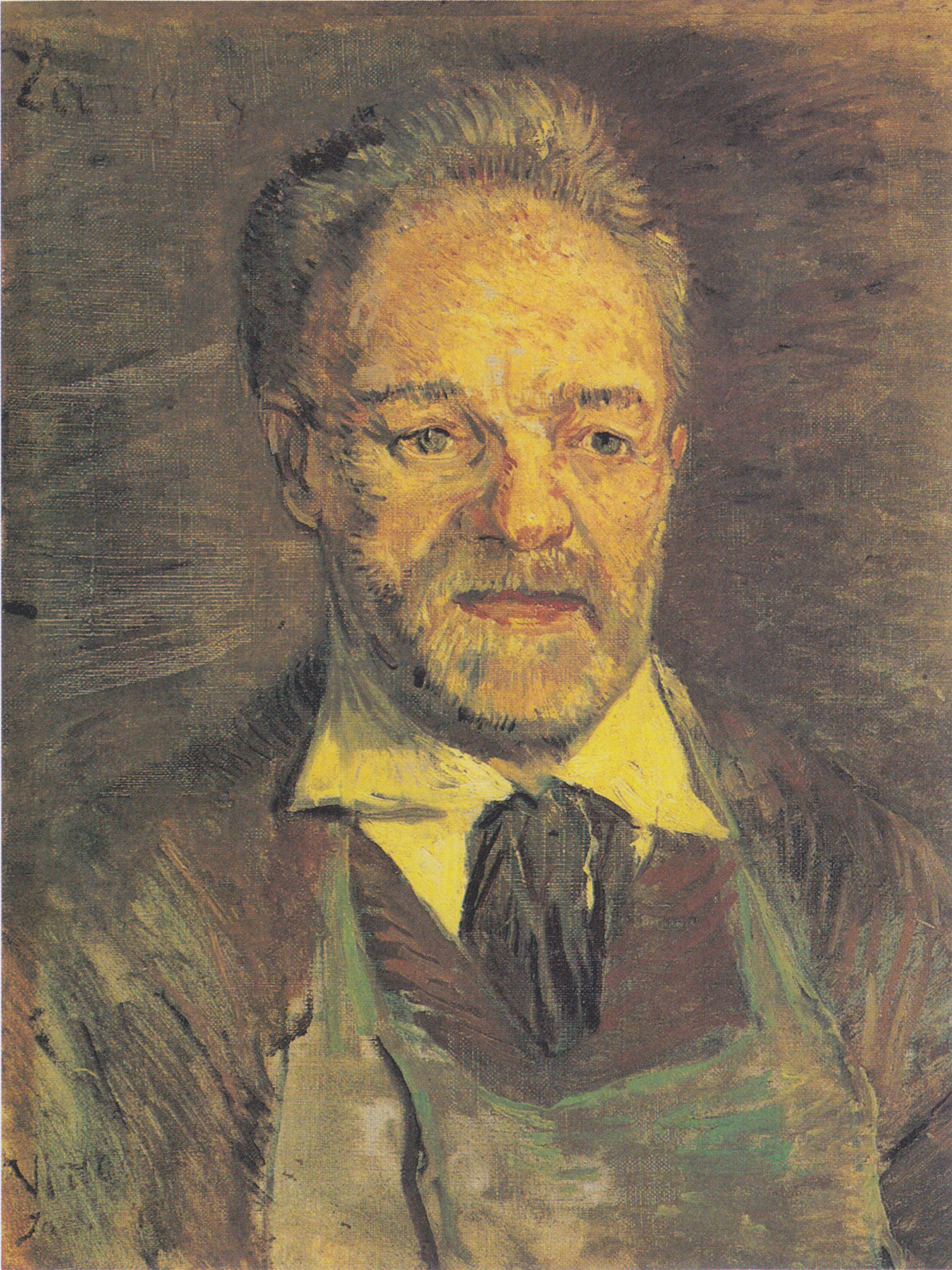
Portrait of Père Tanguy, winter 1886/87. (47x38.5cm) (F263)

In winter 1886/87 van Gogh painted his first portrait of Tanguy. It is mostly brown, with a touch of red on his lips and a green on his apron. Writer Victoria Finlay describes him as looking more like a workman than an art dealer.

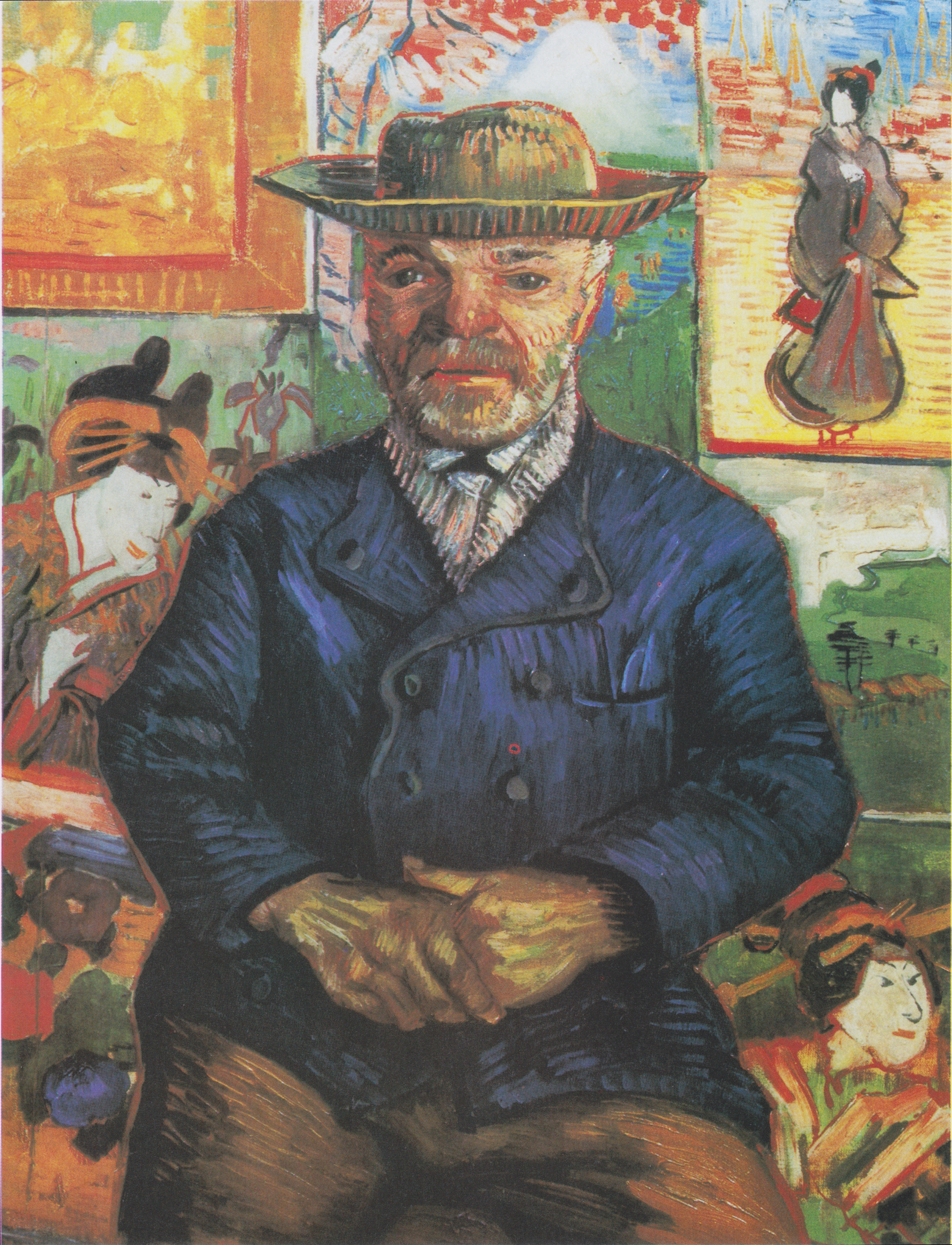
Portrait of Père Tanguy, The second painting of Père Tanguy by Vincent van Gogh (65 cm x 51 cm) (F364)

In 1887, van Gogh began to experiment with brighter colors, such as red against green and orange against blue. The other two paintings show him sitting in front of a colorful wall of Japanese prints. The second to the right was painted by van Gogh in one thirty-minute sitting, and Tanguy kept the original version of the painting. Actor Edward G. Robinson and his wife Gladys Lloyd Robinson, a painter, owned the painting, which they sold to Greek shipping tycoon Stavros Niarchos.

The second, more advanced painting with Japanese prints is held in the Musée Rodin in Paris.
