= The Three Shades =

Sculpture by Auguste Rodin

Les Trois Ombres
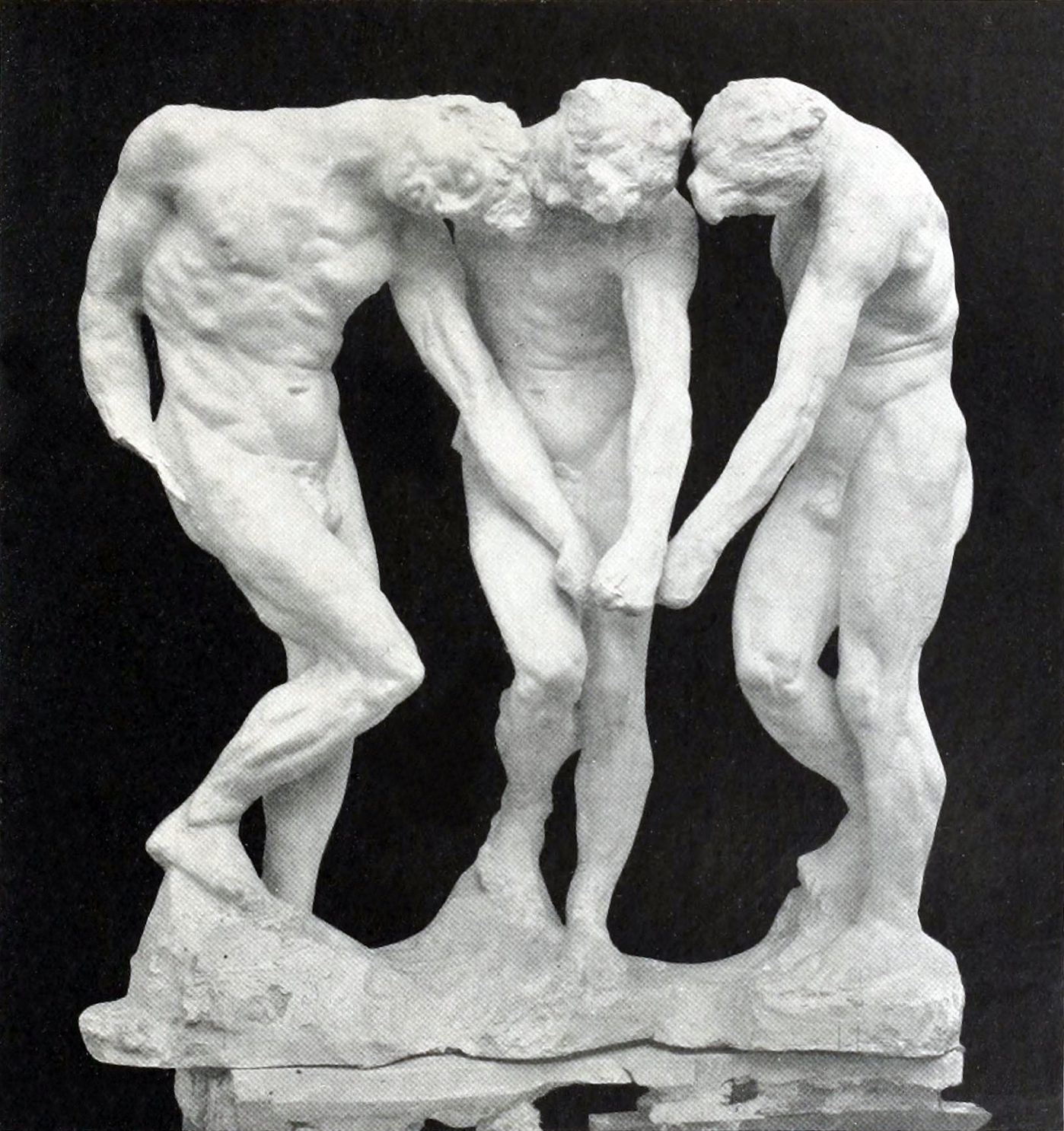
- Les Trois Ombres, plaster original, Musée Rodin, Paris, 1886
- Artist: Auguste Rodin
- Medium: Plaster, later bronze

The Three Shades (Les Trois Ombres) is a sculptural group produced in plaster by Auguste Rodin in 1886 for his The Gates of Hell. He made several individual studies for the Shades before finally deciding to put them together as three identical figures gathered around a central point. The heads hang low so that the neck and shoulders form an almost-horizontal plane. They were to be placed above the gates looking down on the viewer.

== Casts ==
It was later cast in bronze in several editions, with such casts now in the Musée Rodin in Paris, the Cantor Sculpture Garden at Stanford University, in the California Palace of the Legion of Honor, the Rodin Museum in Philadelphia, the Museo Soumaya in Mexico, and the Dixon Gallery and Gardens in Memphis, TN. An autograph plaster copy dating to 1917 is also in the Musée d'arts de Nantes.

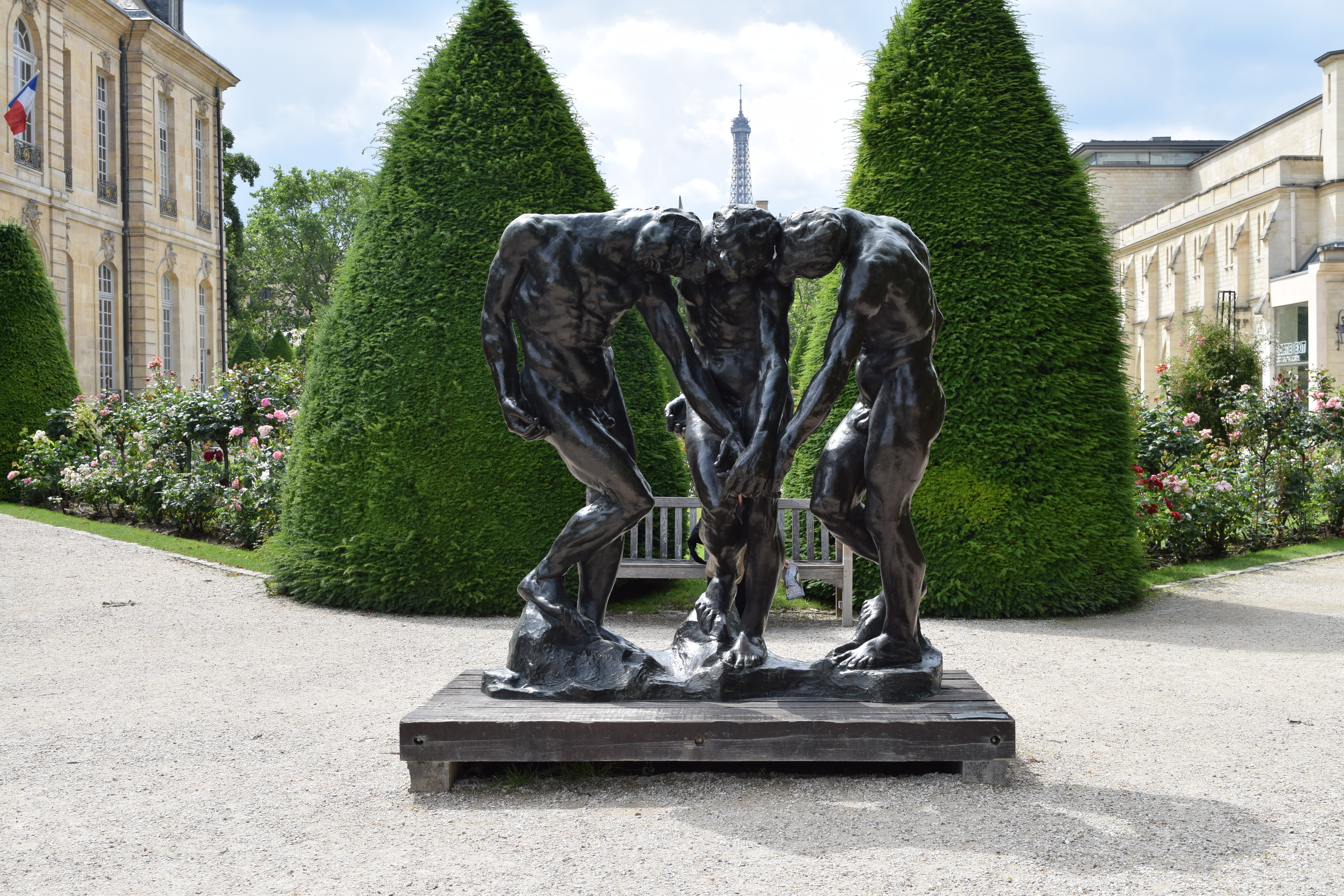
Bronze cast outside the Musée Rodin

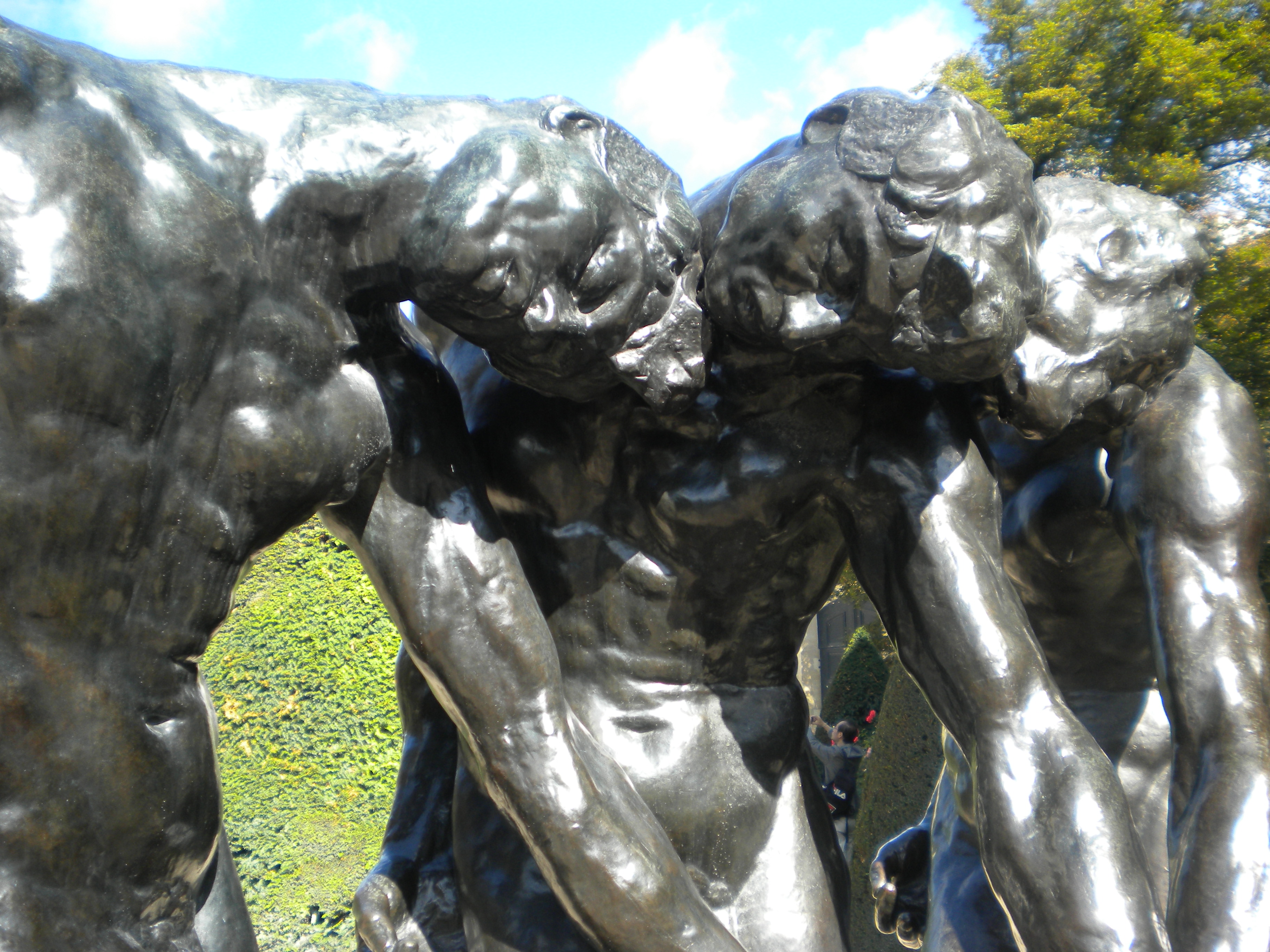
Close up of the bronze cast at Musée Rodin, Paris.

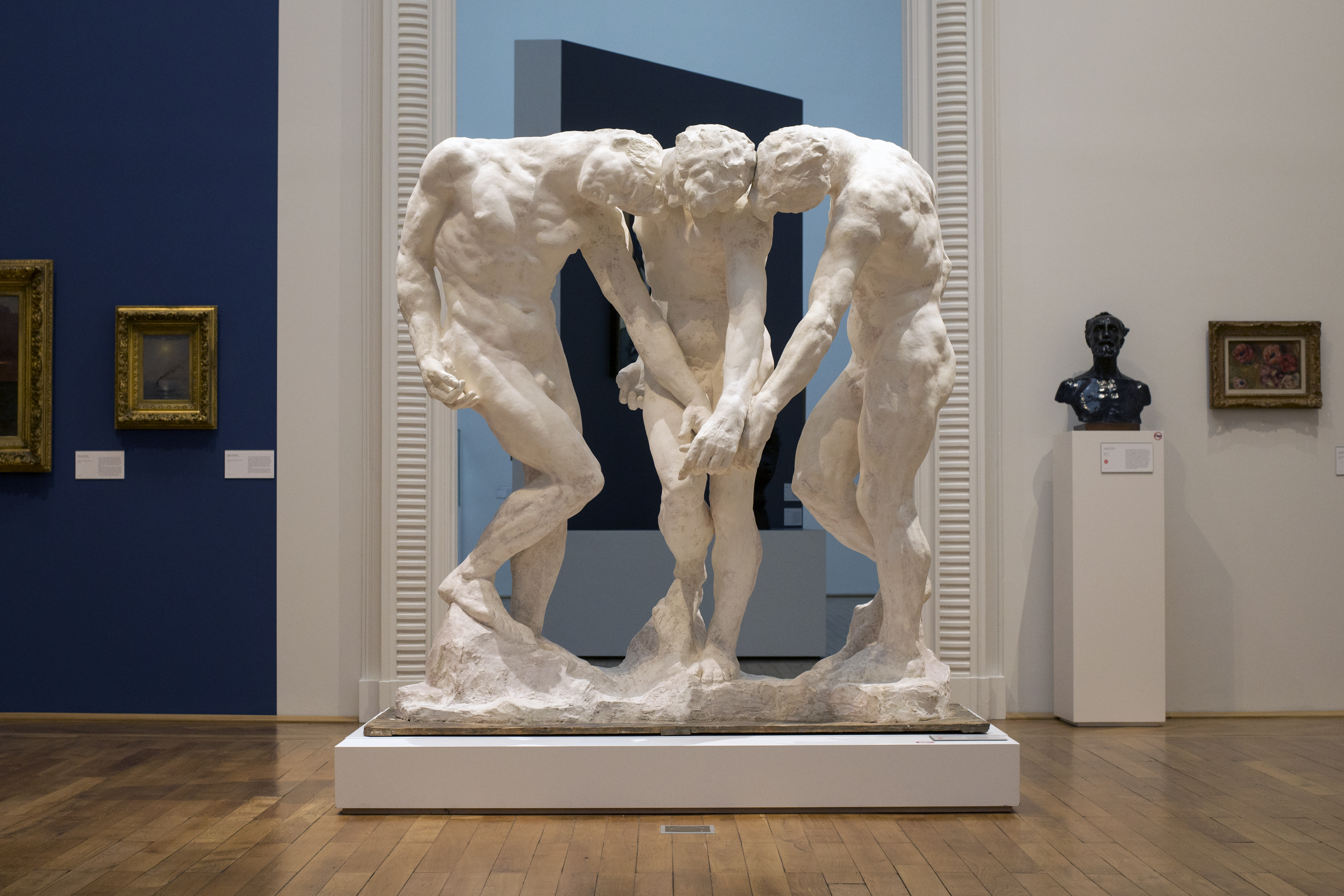
Plaster version at the Musée d'arts de Nantes

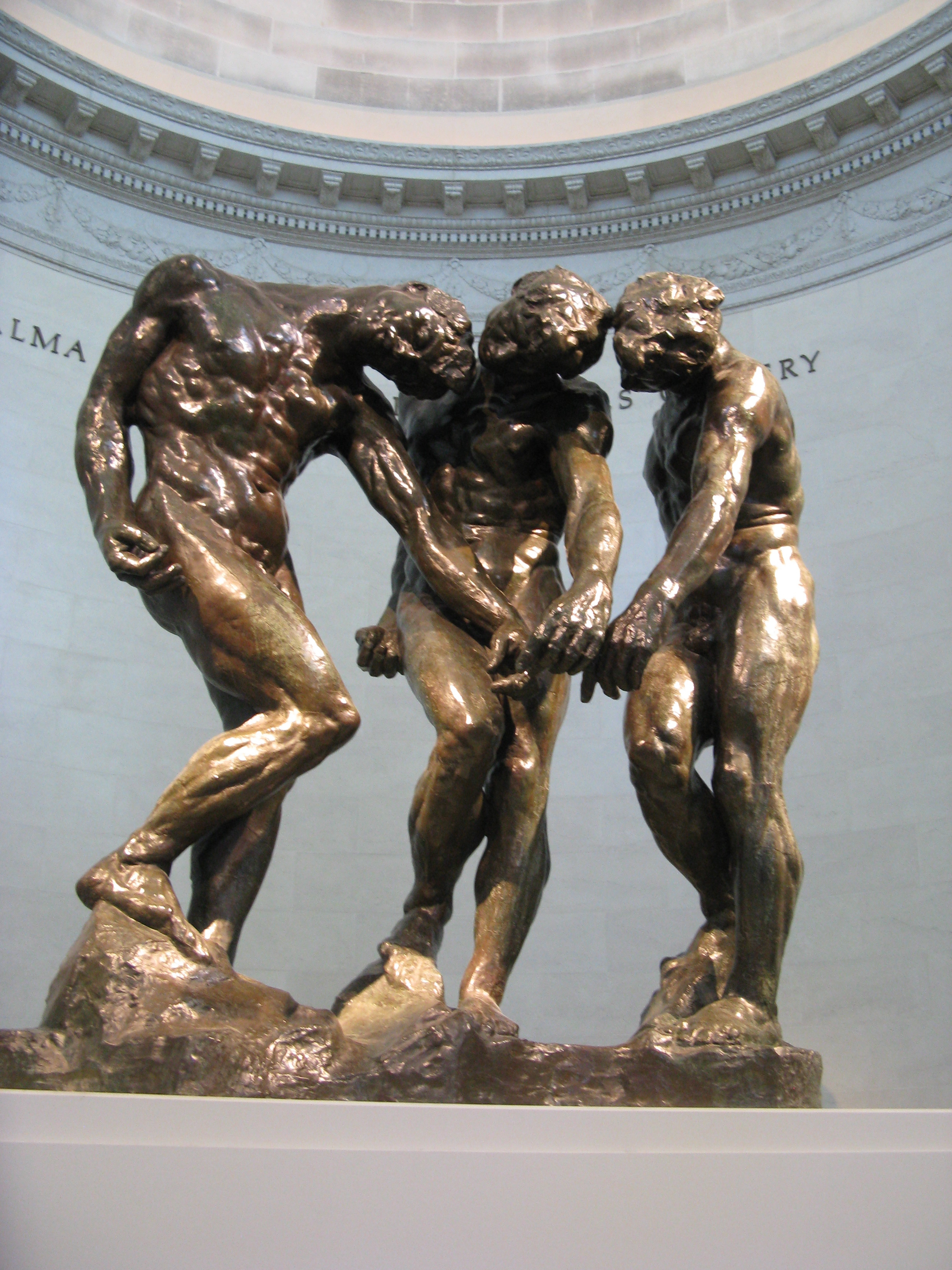
Bronze cast at the California Palace of the Legion of Honor

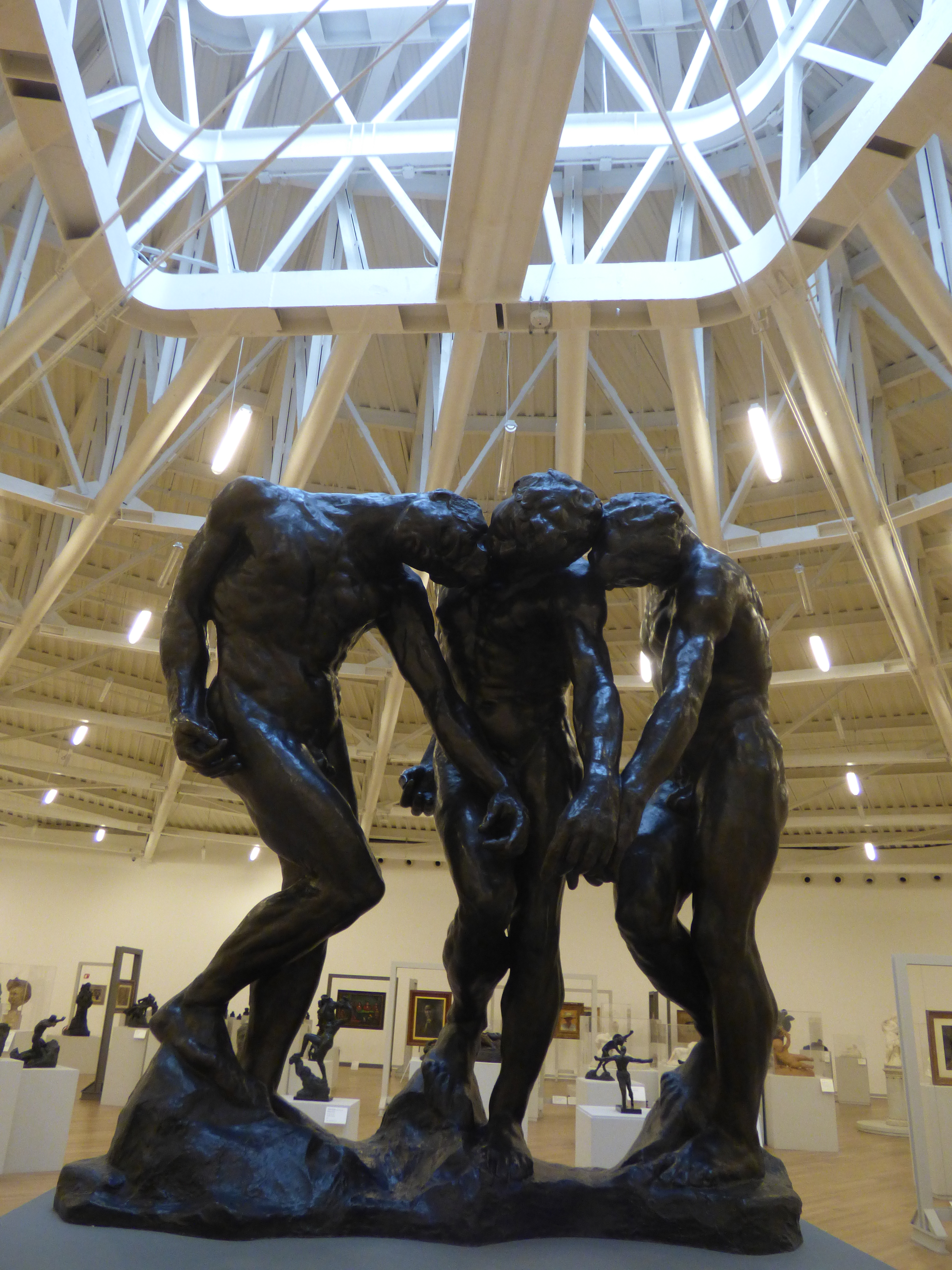
Bronze cast at the Museo Soumaya

== See also ==
- List of sculptures by Auguste Rodin
