= Julien Tanguy =

French art dealer, gallery owner, art collector, and patron

Julien François Tanguy
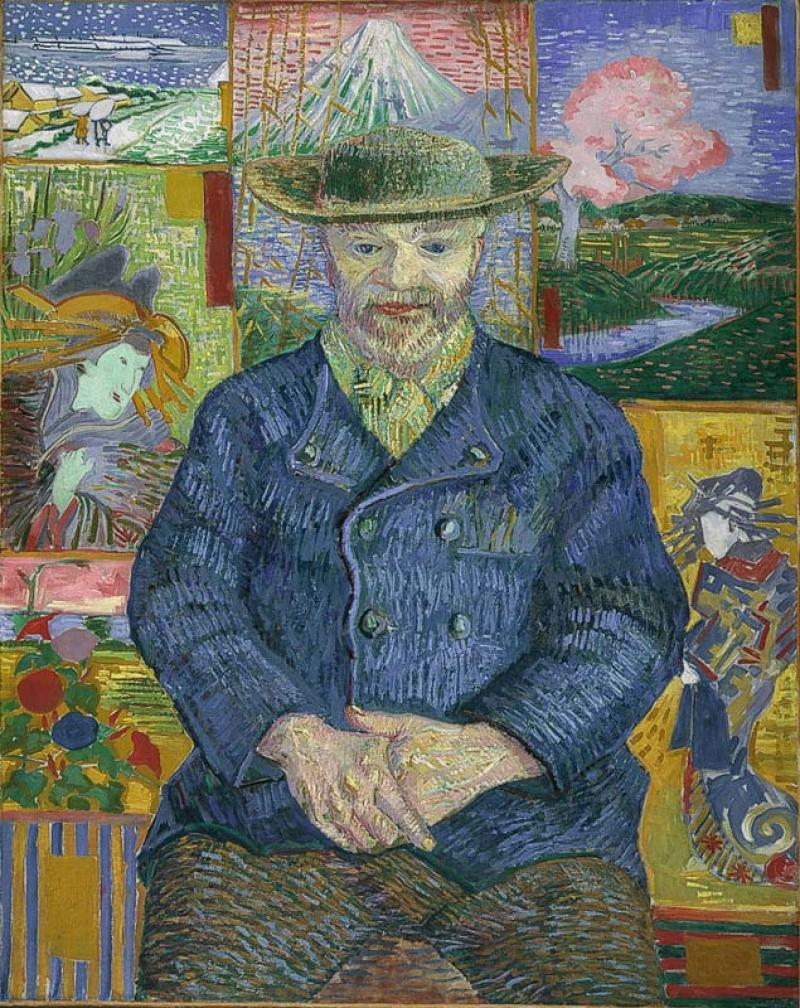
- Portrait of Père Tanguy by Vincent van Gogh
- Born: June 28, 1825; Hillion
- Died: February 6, 1894 (aged 68)
- Spouse: Renée Briend

Julien François Tanguy, called Père Tanguy (28 June 1825, Plédran, Brittany –- 6 February 1894, Paris) was a French paint dealer, gallery owner, art collector, and patron who was one of the first buyers of Impressionist paintings. He played an important role in promoting Impressionism and Post-Impressionism.

== Life ==
Julien Tanguy started out as a plasterer and had other jobs before becoming an independent paint dealer. On 23 April 1855, in Saint-Brieuc, he married Renée Briend, born in Hillion. In 1860, the couple moved to Paris. Tanguy opened an itinerant shop in 1868, selling his paints in, for example, Barbizon or Argenteuil. He was a Communard in the struggles of the Paris Commune of 1871, was captured but released at the instigation of friends. In 1873, he opened a shop selling artists' supplies in Paris at 14 rue Clauzel. There he sold his paints to the artists and provided them with meals when needed. He sometimes took their pictures on commission in return for the delivery of material, in order to be able to sell them when the opportunity arose. In June 1891 the gallery moved to 9 rue Clauzel.

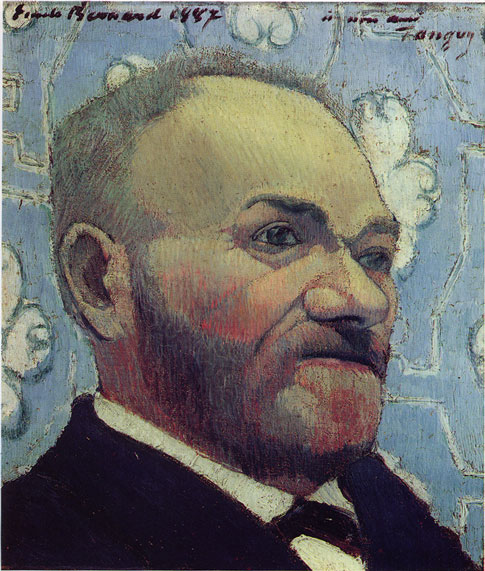
Portrait of Tanguy by Bernard

A paternal friend, "Père Tanguy" counted among his clients the art collectors Paul Gachet and Victor Chocquet, the painters Camille Pissarro, Claude Monet, Pierre-Auguste Renoir, Paul Gauguin, Armand Guillaumin, Henri de Toulouse-Lautrec, Vincent van Gogh, Paul Cézanne and Victor Vignon, whose paintings he exhibited and sold. Artists and art collectors interested in the Impressionist movement and later in the work of Paul Cézanne would visit his collection in the small gallery attached to the art supply store. The painter and writer Émile Bernard described Tanguy's gallery as the birthplace of Symbolism and the Pont-Aven school.

Paul Cézanne found particular support from Tanguy. He was initially the only point of contact for Cézanne in Paris. Tanguy gave him credit and introduced his paintings to an affluent audience as well as other artists. Acquisitions of Cézanne's work span the years 1873 to 1885. Among the paintings by Cézanne owned by Tanguy was the Portrait of Achille Emperaire, currently in the collection of the Musée d'Orsay.

Vincent van Gogh, who had left the Netherlands and stayed with his brother Theo in Paris since March 1886, created three portraits of the paint dealer and gallery owner. The first picture shows him as a paint dealer, the two following show van Gogh's preference for Japonism, recognizable by the Japanese prints in the background. The last image he created can be seen in the introduction. The sculptor Auguste Rodin acquired it from the estate in 1894. It is currently in the collection of the Musée Rodin.

Octave Mirbeau honored the patron after his death in L'Écho de Paris on 13 February 1894. On 2 June 1894, at the suggestion of Mirbeau, painter friends auctioned off their own works, the proceeds of which were intended to support his widow, in the Hôtel Drouot. The auction brought in proceeds of 10,000 francs. The young gallery owner Ambroise Vollard acquired cheap paintings by the then almost unknown painters Cézanne, Gauguin, and van Gogh from the estate, which enabled him to exhibit a Cézanne retrospective a year later. She introduced Cézanne to fame, and its success enabled Vollard to move to a larger gallery in 1896.

In 2007, more than a hundred years after Tanguy's death, a gallery dedicated to Japanese art opened in the same place called "Père Tanguy".
