= Eugène Murer (Renoir) =

1877 painting by Pierre-Auguste Renoir

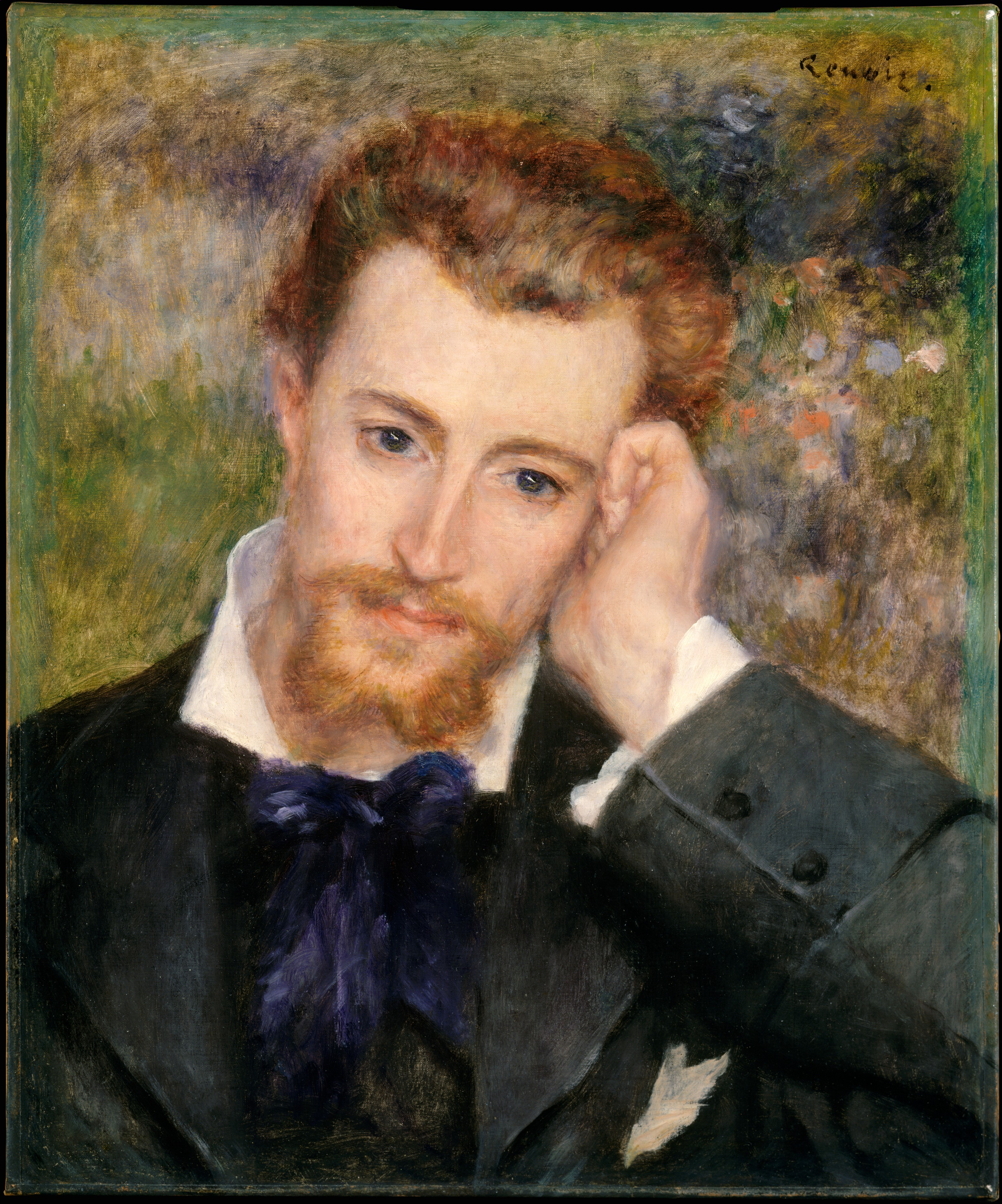
- Artist: Pierre-Auguste Renoir
- Year: 1877
- Medium: Oil on canvas
- Dimensions: 47 cm × 39.4 cm (19 in × 15.5 in)
- Location: Metropolitan Museum of Art; New York City, New York

Eugène Murer is an oil-on-canvas painting by the French artist Pierre-Auguste Renoir created in 1877. It is a portrait of pastry chef, artist, writer, collector, and sponsor Hyacinthe-Eugène Meunier (1841–1906), popularly known as Eugène Murer. It was acquired by the Metropolitan Museum of Art in 2002. This portrait of Eugène is one of four paintings of the Murer family by Renoir, including two of Eugène's half-sister Marie (Portrait of Mademoiselle Marie Murer) and one of his son Paul (Portrait of Paul Meunier). Murer was one of the largest supporters of the Impressionists in the 1870s, but paid low prices for their works. It is estimated that Renoir received 100 francs for each portrait that Murer bought.

== See also ==
- List of paintings by Pierre-Auguste Renoir
