= Eugène Murer =

French art collector and painter

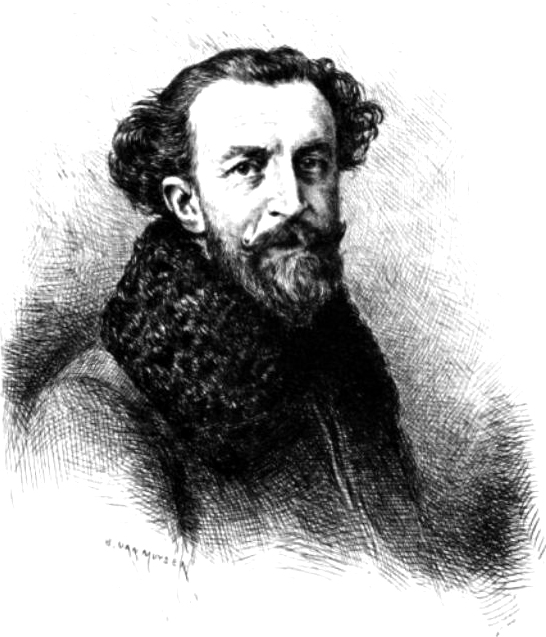
- Born: Hyacinthe-Eugène Meunier
- Died: April 22, 1906 (aged 64); Auvers-sur-Oise
- Movement: Impressionism

Hyacinthe-Eugène Meunier (14 May 1841 – 22 April 1906), known as Eugène Murer, was a pastry chef, author, self-taught painter and collector of impressionist paintings.

He was born in Poitiers on 14 May 1846. He was a childhood friend of Armand Guillaumin, who introduced him to the impressionists. He was an apprentice pastry chef at Grû at 8 Rue du Faubourg-Montmartre and 125 Faubourg Poissonnière.

He ran a patisserie at 95 Boulevard Voltaire, where he invited, for "Tuesday-dinner", young artists, collectors, and established artists. Renoir, Sisley, Monet, Cézanne, Gachet, Vincent and Theo Van Gogh, Père Tanguy, art dealers Louis Legrand and Alphonse Portier, Goeneutte, Guillaumin, Vignon, Pierre Franc-Lamy, and Pissarro were among his guests. British art historian Colin B. Bailey notes that Murer's diary from this time contains a sad entry about the suicide of Vincent van Gogh that demands further study.

He died in Auvers-sur-Oise, where he was a neighbour of Gachet, on 22 April 1906. He lived on 39 rue Victor Massé, Paris, above a carpenter and art supply dealer called Michel, where he bought his paints. The Musée d'Orsay owns one of his paintings, L'Oise at Isle-Adam, from 1903.

== Bibliography ==
He published under the pseudonym Gêne-Mûr.

- Comment Se Vengent Les Batards; 1865
- Les Fils du siècle; 1877
- Pauline Lavinia; 1887
- La mère Nom de Dieu! 1888

A portrait by Camille Pissarro from 1878 is in the collection of the Museum of Fine Arts in Springfield, Massachusetts.

== Gallery ==
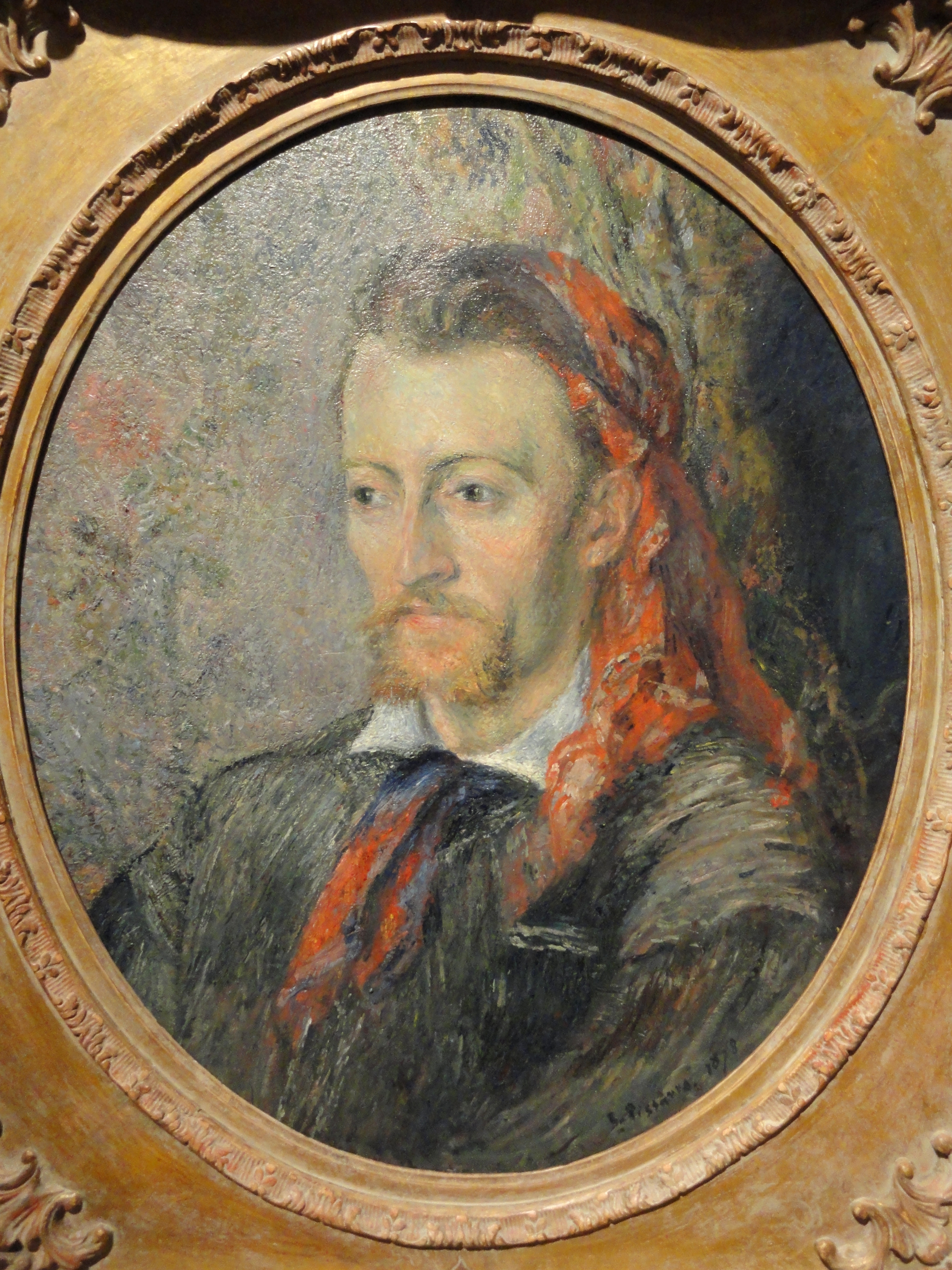
Portrait of Eugène Murer, Camille Pissarro, 1878

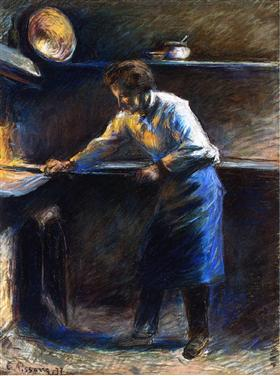
Camille Pissarro, Eugène Murer at his pastry oven, 1877.

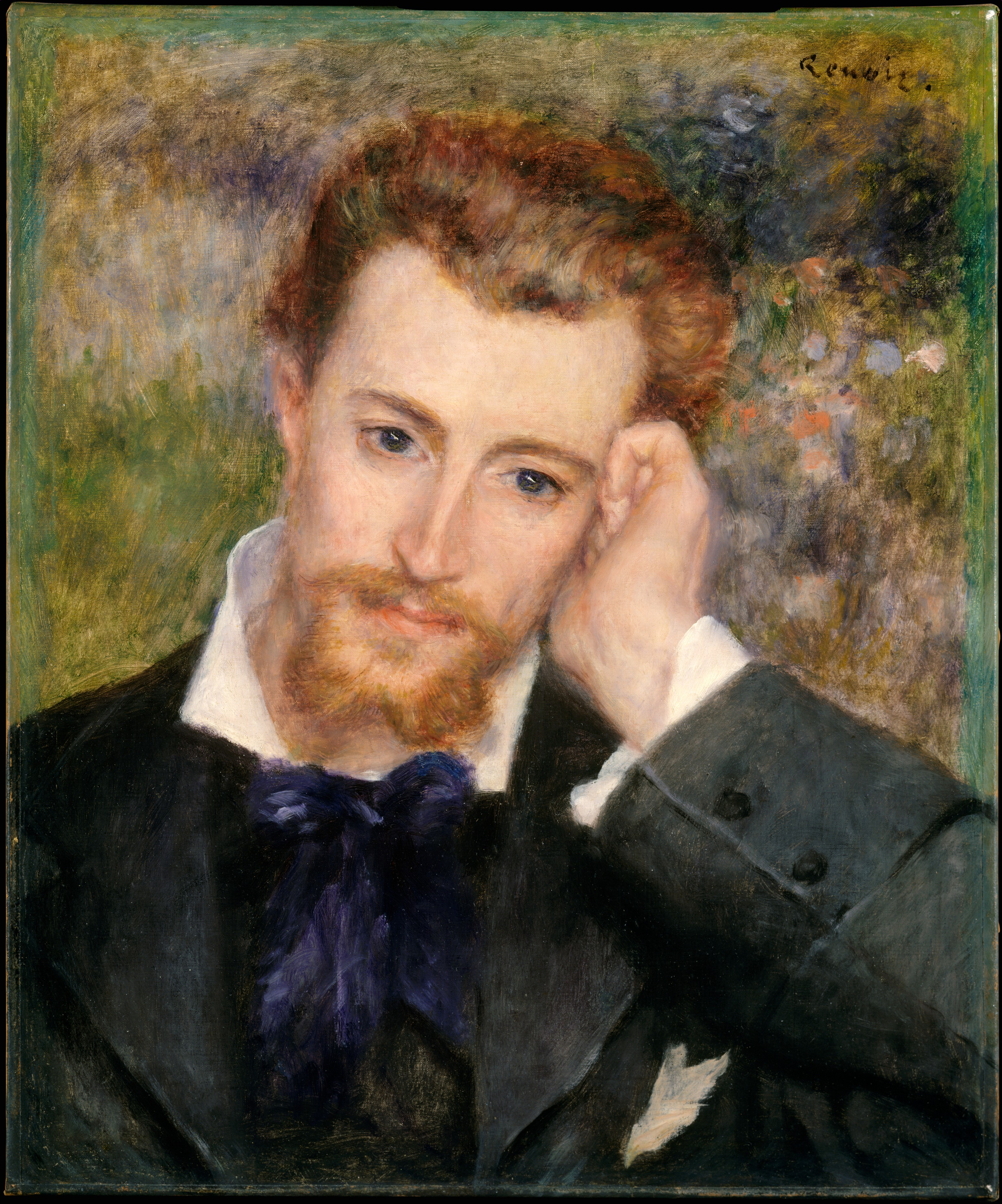
Eugène Murer, Pierre-Auguste Renoir 1877
