= Musée Rodin =

Art museum in Paris

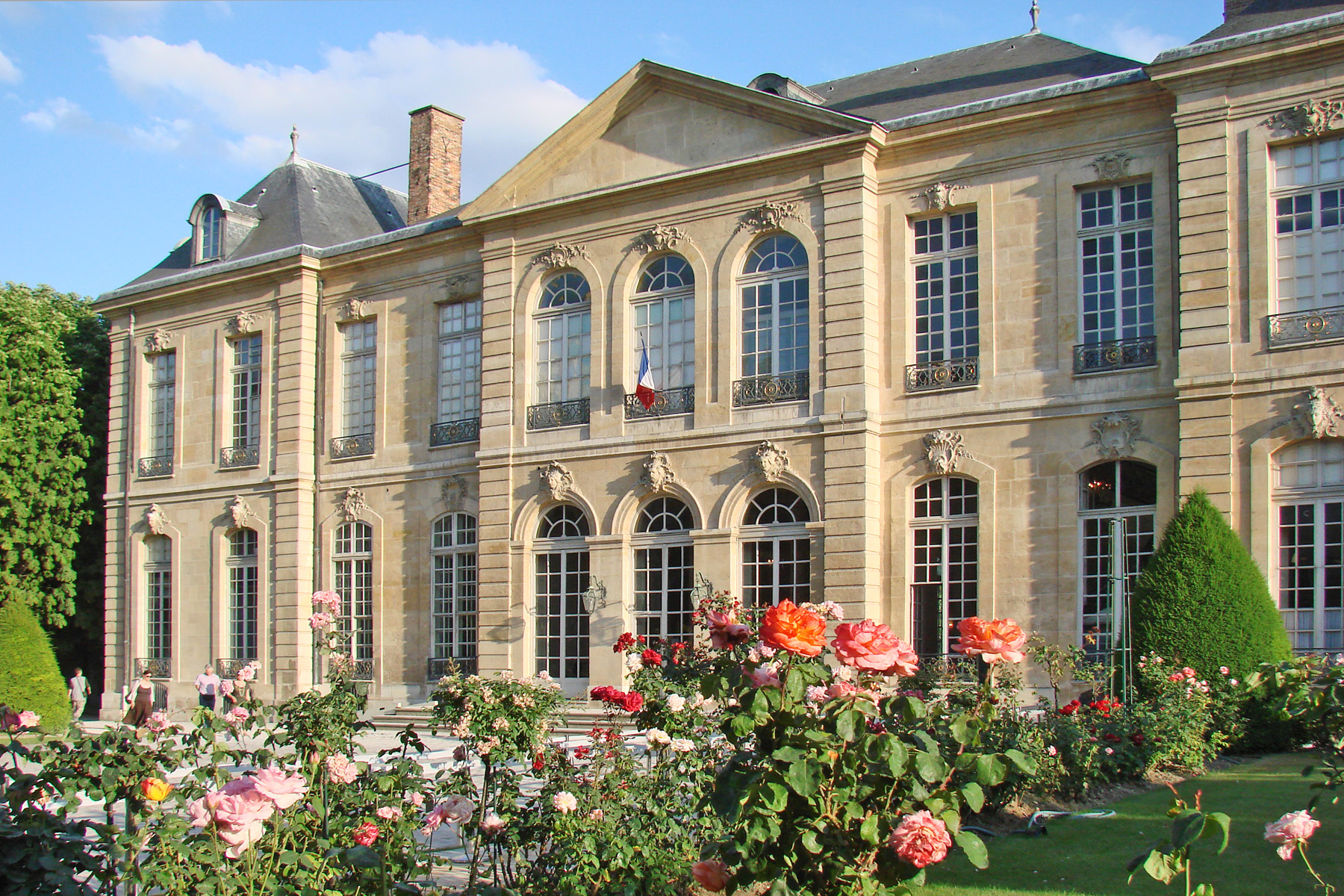
- Hôtel Biron

- Location within Paris
- Interactive fullscreen map
- Established: 1919; 107 years ago
- Location: 77 rue de Varenne; Paris, France
- Coordinates: 48.855278°N 2.315833°E
- Director: Amélie Simier

The Musée Rodin (English: Rodin Museum) of Paris, France, is an art museum that was opened in 1919, primarily dedicated to the works of the French sculptor Auguste Rodin. It has two sites: the Hôtel Biron and surrounding grounds in central Paris, as well as just outside Paris at Rodin's old home, the Villa des Brillants at Meudon, Hauts-de-Seine. The collection includes 6,600 sculptures, 8,000 drawings, 8,000 old photographs and 7,000 objets d'art. The museum receives 700,000 visitors annually.

While living in the Villa des Brillants, Rodin used the Hôtel Biron as his workshop from 1908 onwards. Hôtel Biron had been designed by the architect Jean Aubert and Rodin donated his entire collection of sculptures, along with paintings by Vincent van Gogh, Claude Monet and Pierre-Auguste Renoir he had acquired to the French State on the condition that they turn the buildings into a museum dedicated to his works. The Musée Rodin contains most of Rodin's significant creations, including The Thinker, The Kiss and The Gates of Hell. Many of his sculptures are displayed in the museum's extensive garden. The museum includes a room dedicated to the works of Camille Claudel and one of the two castings of The Mature Age.

The gardens around the museum building contain many of the famous sculptures in natural settings. Behind the museum building are a small lake and casual restaurant. Additionally, the nearby Métro stop, Varenne, features some of Rodin's sculptures on the platform. The building is served by Métro (Line 13), RER (Line C: Invalides) and bus (69, 82, 87, 92).

== Permanent collections ==
=== Sculptures ===
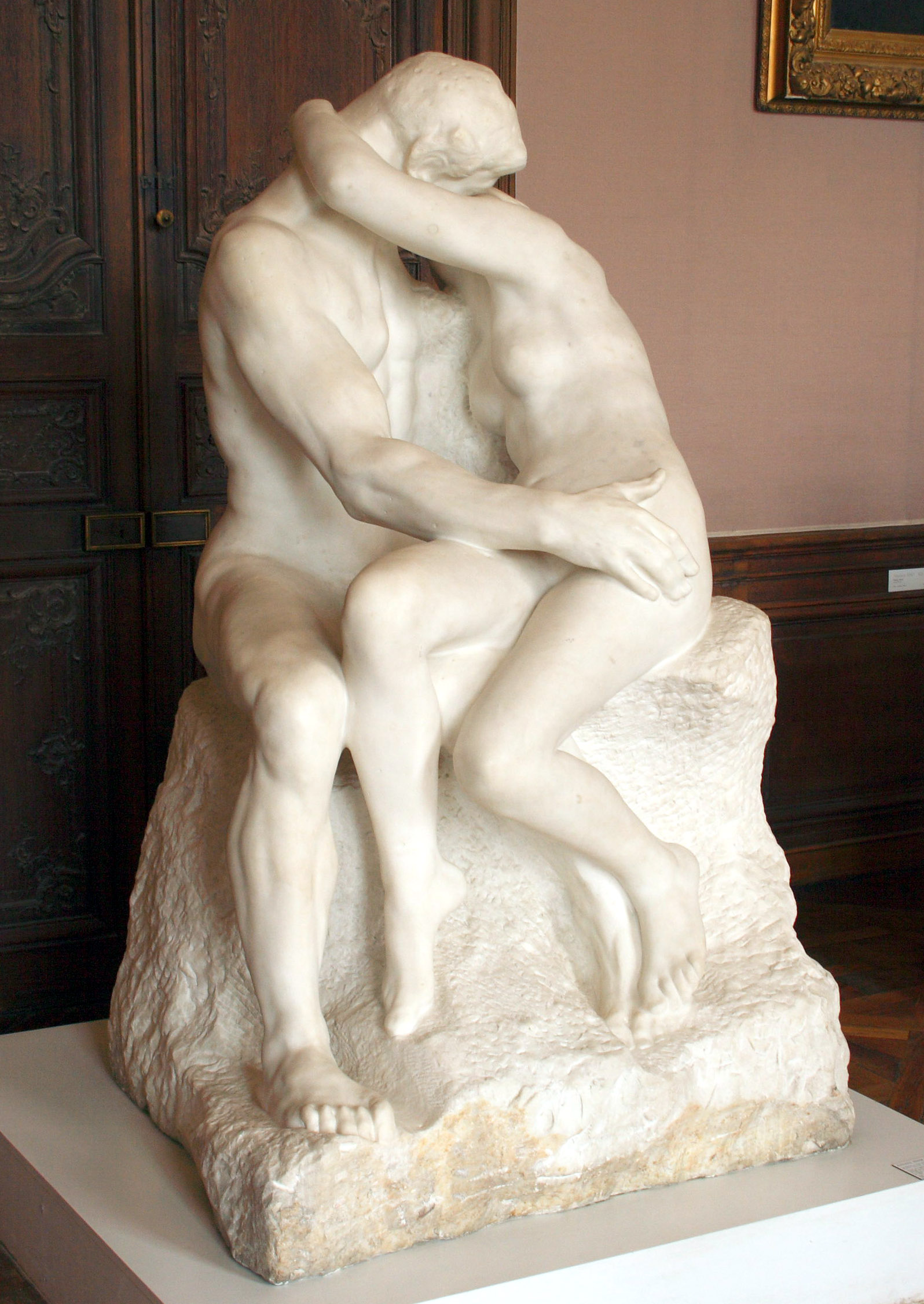
The Kiss, Auguste Rodin, 1889

Among the works of Rodin's youth, Man with a Broken Nose appears out of step with contemporary aesthetic norms, while The Age of Bronze rejects contemporary mechanisms of physical expression. This absence of artifice, like the nudity of The Thinker or Adam and Eve guarantees the timelessness of Rodin's works.

The large gardens of the Musée Rodin showcase the most famous bronze sculptures, including The Gates of Hell, The Thinker, The Kiss, and The Burgher of Calais.

The artist also stands out by the monumental aspect of some of his works: Balzac, The Burghers of Calais or the impressive, unfinished The Gates of Hell, which contains many elements representing the major works of Rodin (The Thinker, Ugolino, The Kiss or The Three Shades).

=== Drawings ===
The graphic collection at the Musée Rodin contains around 7,000 drawings. They can be associated with different styles and periods: observation of landscapes, fantasy works inspired by Dante or Baudelaire, numerous erotic nudes or even portraits.

=== Photography ===
The Musée Rodin preserves an important collection of 25,000 photographs. Among these, 7,000 were collected by Rodin himself. The artist showed indeed a great interest in this science and art, and he has collaborated with many photographers, such as Eugène Druet, Jacques-Ernest Bulloz, Adolphe Braun or Edward Steichen.

Subjects and themes are varied, Rodin's personal albums attest to his centres of interest and artistic sources, while the portraits and newspaper photographs illustrate his work and his life. Above all, these photographs are a great source to learn what happened in the studio between 1877 and Rodin's death, in 1917.

=== Camille Claudel room ===
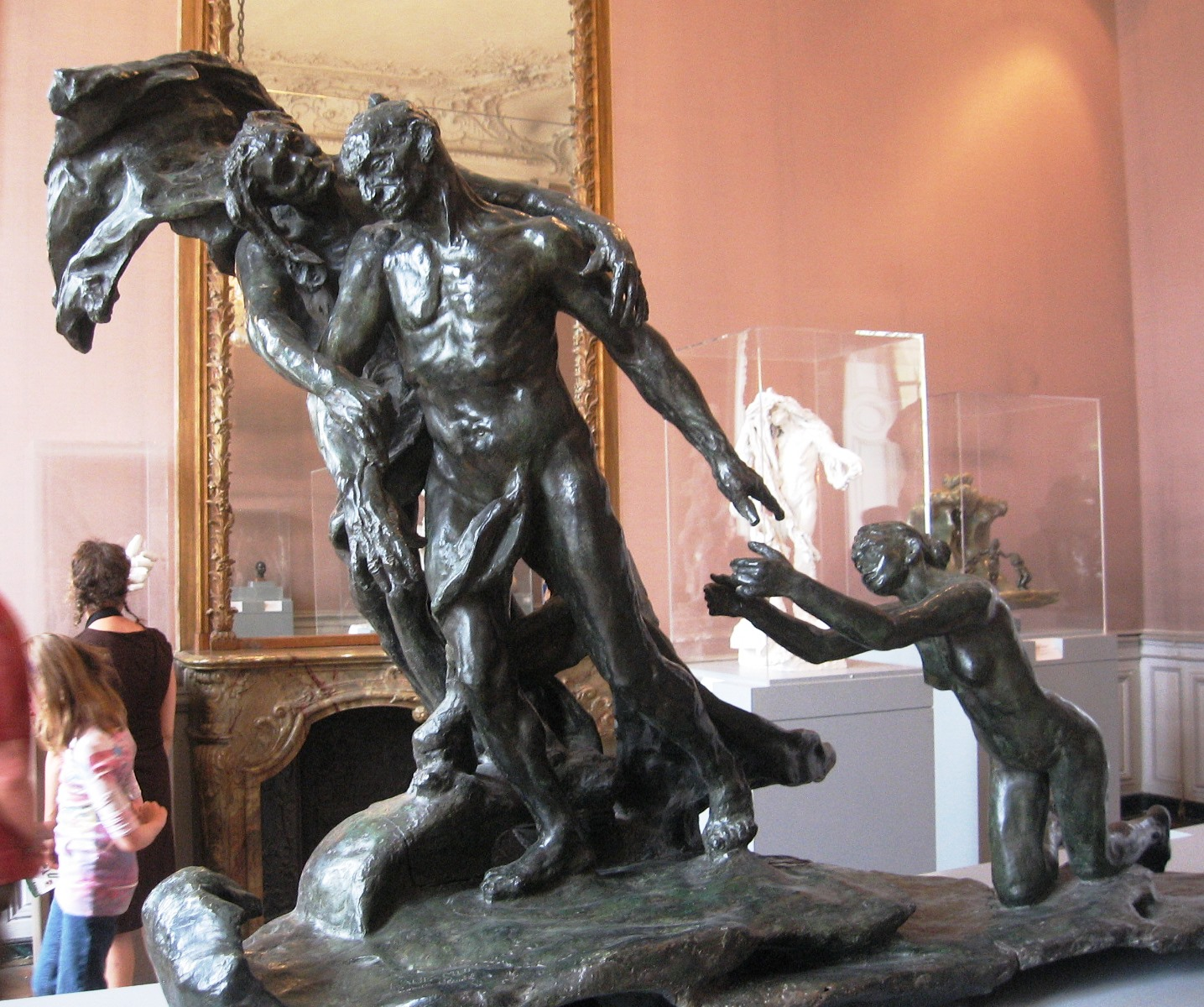
The Mature Age by Camille Claudel (1898), the 1913 bronze casting is exhibited in the Claudel room

The Camille Claudel room contains such Claudel works as the 1913 casting of The Mature Age (1898), The Wave (1897), The Waltz, Sakountala (1905), and an 1892 casting of Bust of Rodin (1888–1889).

Claudel, a student and model for Rodin, and soon his collaborator, associate, and lover, worked with Rodin from 1884 until the early 1890s. They kept in close contact until 1899.

=== Rodin as a collector ===
During the last twenty years of his life, as he was living in Meudon, Rodin started a collection of ancient works of art from Egypt, Greece and Rome, then later from the Far East. As the collection was growing, the different pieces invaded the studio and his house, replacing the casts after Antique statues. As Rodin's fame grew, the commissions he received enabled him to continue his collection, reaching over 6,000 works in 1917.

In addition, Rodin's friendships and tastes led him to surrounding himself with works by the Naturalists (Théodule Ribot, Alfred Roll) and Symbolists (Eugène Carrière, Charles Cottet...). Through a series of exchanges made with his artist friends, Rodin owned works of art from Jules Dalou, Alexandre Falguière or Jean-Paul Laurens. He also realised important purchases: three Van Gogh's (including Père Tanguy, late 1887), Renoir's Nude in the Sunlight and Monet's Belle-Île.

== Temporary exhibitions ==
=== Temporary exhibitions dedicated to Rodin ===
- La sculpture dans l’espace, Rodin, Brâncuși, Giacometti (November 2005–February 2006): 82,000 visitors
- Rodin et les danseuses cambodgiennes, sa dernière passion (June 2006–September 2006): 91,000 visitors
- Rodin, les figures d’Eros (November 2006–March 2007): 84,000 visitors
- Camille Claudel, une femme, une artiste (April 2008–July 2008): 150,000 visitors
- La Passion à l’œuvre, Rodin et Freud, collectionneurs (October 2008–February 2009)
- Corps et décors. Rodin et les arts décoratifs (April 2010–August 2010)
- Rodin. Laboratoire de la création (November 2014–September 2015)

=== Contemporary art exhibitions ===
Recently, contemporary art exhibitions are also organized, as it was done as early as 1949 when the first Salon de la jeune sculpture took place at the Musée Rodin. Artists such as Anthony Caro, Eugène Dodeigne, Étienne Bossut exhibited at the museum. Bill Viola, Adel Abdessemed and Mircea Cantor have been invited to screen videos in the park for the « Nuit des musées ». In 2010, artworks by Belgian artist Wim Delvoye were exhibited, as well as a program of video-performances by artists such as Vito Acconci, Sanja Iveković, Marina Abramović and Mona Hatoum. A Henry Moore exhibition, dedicated to his studio and small sculptures, ran there from October 2010 to February 2011.

== Museum locations ==
Musée Rodin, Paris.

=== Hôtel Biron, Paris ===
First opened to the public on 4 August 1919, the Musée Rodin was housed in a mansion, formerly called the Hôtel Peyrenc de Moras, designed with the lines of classical architecture and ornamented with rocaille decoration. It was built in the Rue de Varenne, between 1727 and 1732. From 1788, the Hôtel was occupied by a series of owners and tenants. In 1820, the Duchess of Charost sold the entire property to three nuns belonging to a religious congregation, the Society of the Sacred Heart of Jesus. A boarding school for girls was opened and the decorations were progressively sold. Between 1820 and 1904, several buildings were constructed on the estate, the Chapel in particular, designed by the architect Jean Juste Gustave Lisch and achieved in 1876.

The Society was dissolved in 1904 due to the 'religious orders' law involving the separation of church and state which prohibited religious orders from teaching. The sisters were evicted and the estate was put up for sale. Awaiting a buyer, tenants were allowed to occupy the building; among them were Jean Cocteau, Henri Matisse, Isadora Duncan and Rainer Maria Rilke, whose future wife Clara Westhoff was living in the Hôtel and was the first to tell Rodin about the estate. In 1908, the sculptor rented four ground-floor rooms to use as his studios. From 1911 onwards, he occupied the whole building. In 1911, as the French state had committed itself to purchasing the Hôtel Biron, Rodin started to negotiate with it. The artist announced officially his intention to donate all his works to the French state, as well as his drawings and his collection of antiquities in the condition that the State keeps all these collections at the Hôtel Biron, which will become the Musée Rodin in exchange of the right to reside there all his life.

In 1916, the French Assembly passed a law permitting the State to accept the donations and allocated the mansion and its garden to a museum. Léonce Bénédite was appointed executor of the sculptor's will: his tasks were to manage Rodin's artistic heritage and to supervise the organisation of the future museum.

Listed as a historical monument in 1926, the Hôtel Biron and its grounds have since undergone major renovation and restoration work, to better assert their role as a museum. The most recent scheme was the restoration, which began in 2012 and was completed by 12 November 2015, Rodin's 175th birthday. The renovations cost 16 million euro ($17.4 million), and were hailed as a "moral duty" by France's Culture Minister Fleur Pellerin.

=== Musée Rodin in Meudon ===
On 19 December 1895, Rodin purchased a Louis XIII-style house in brick and stone, built on the heights of Meudon and called "La Villa des Brillants". In 1900, almost 50 people, including sculptor's assistants, workers and casters, were employed there by Rodin and, although he continued to go to his Paris studios daily, his major creative work was done in Meudon. The place became soon a major place of attraction for friends, admirers or celebrities from France or abroad. It is also in Meudon that Rodin and his wife, Rose Beuret, have chosen to be buried.

After the death of Rodin, the villa and the studio also became a museum, open three days per week. Visitors can discover the atmosphere of the studio and the place where Rodin liked to live and work. Inaugurated in 1948, the museum also permits to glimpse numerous plasters, including casts for Rodin's monumental works, such as the Burghers of Calais and the Gates of Hell which allow to discover the different steps of the creative process.

== Gallery of sculptures ==
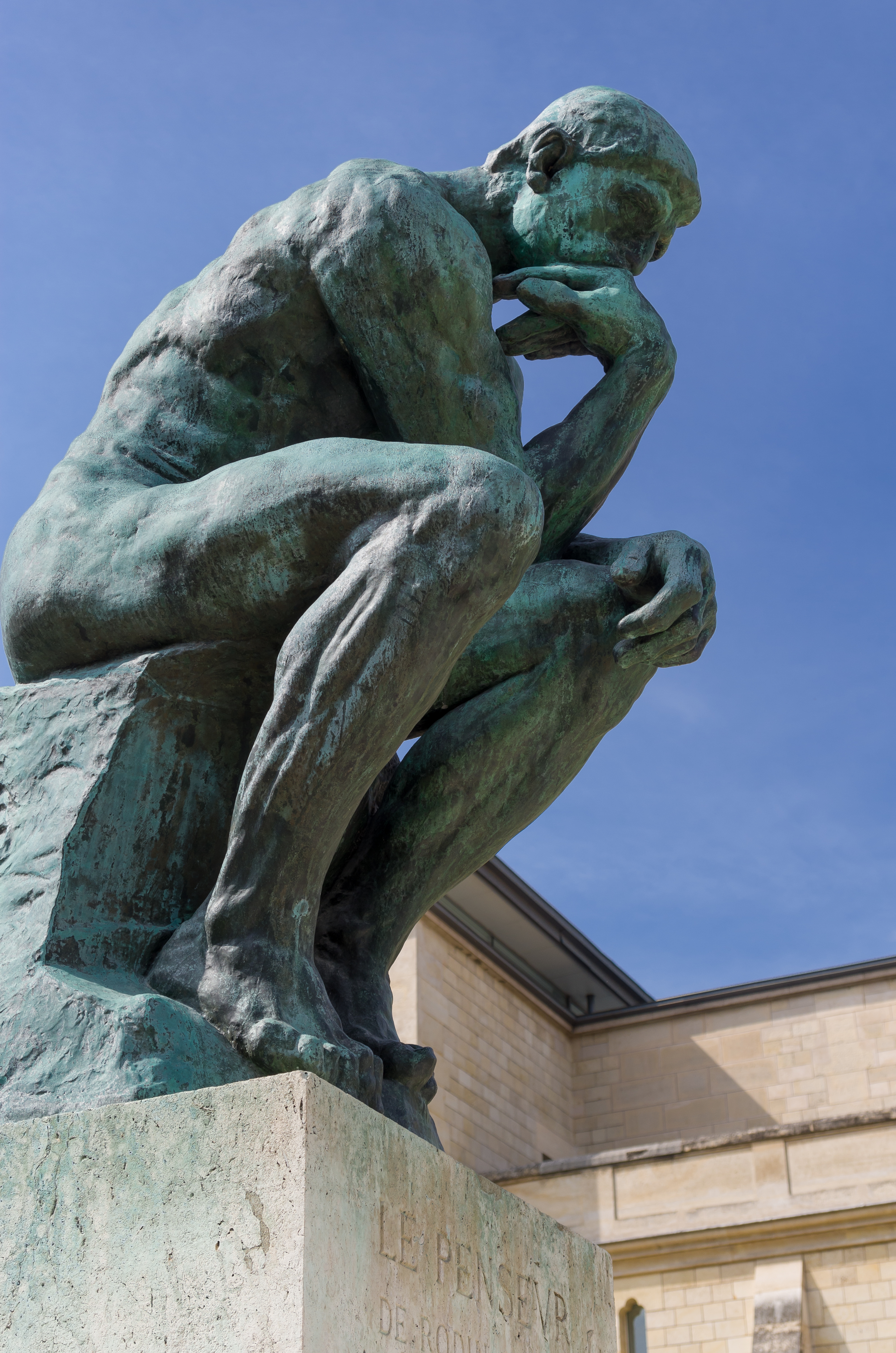
The Thinker (1904) in the garden of the museum

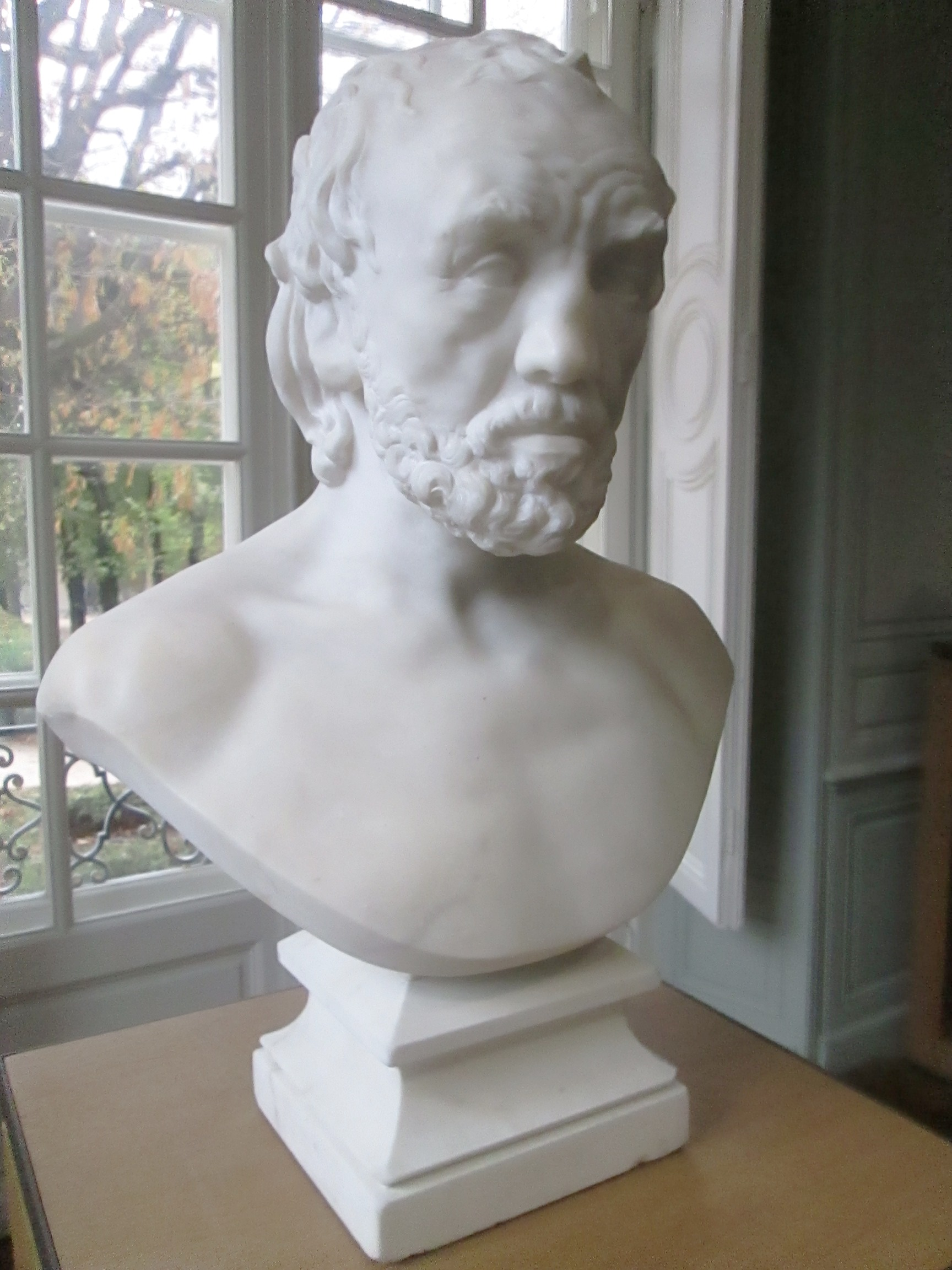
The Man with the Broken Nose (plaster, 1864)

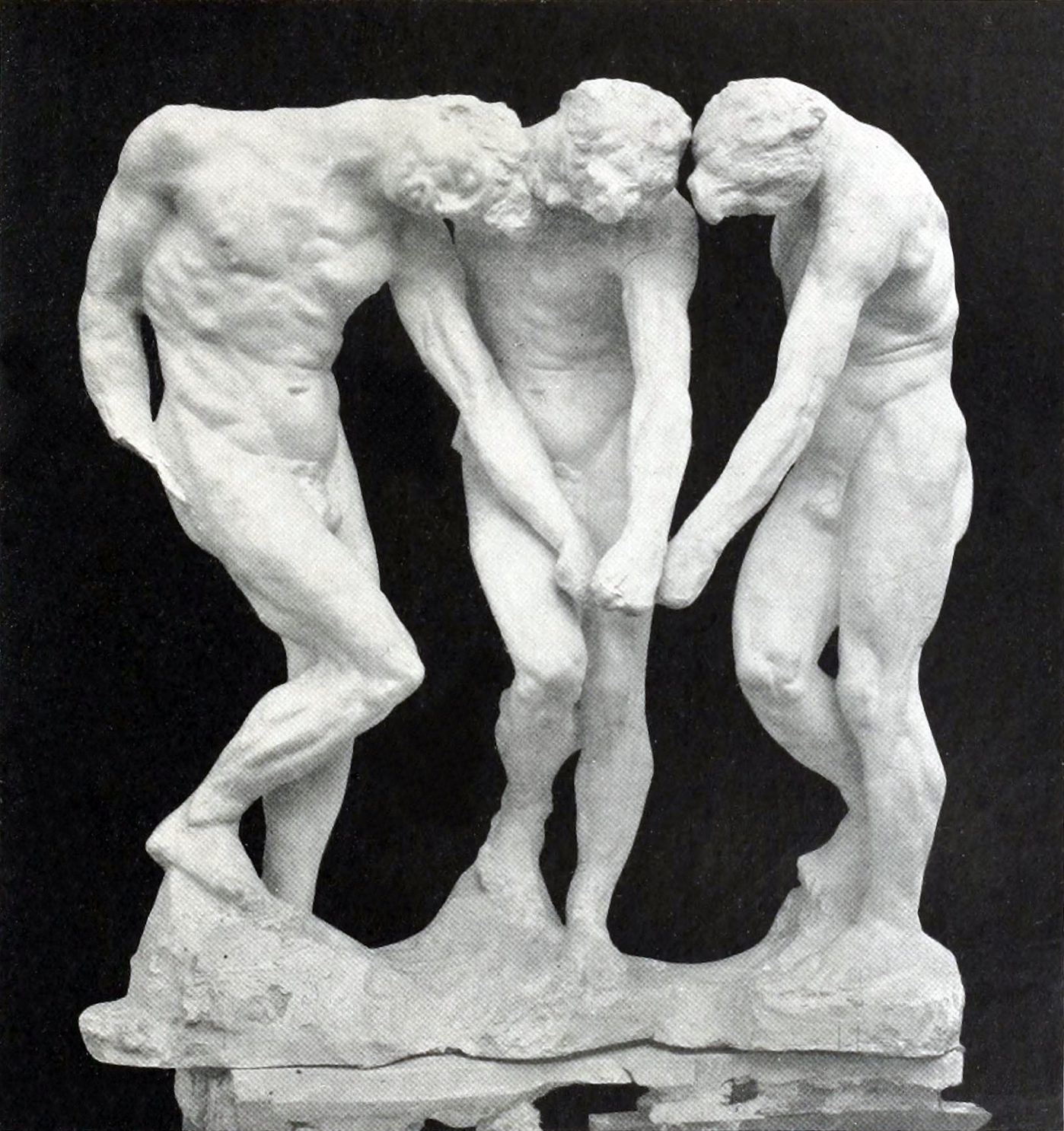
The Three Shades (before 1886), plaster original for The Gates of Hell

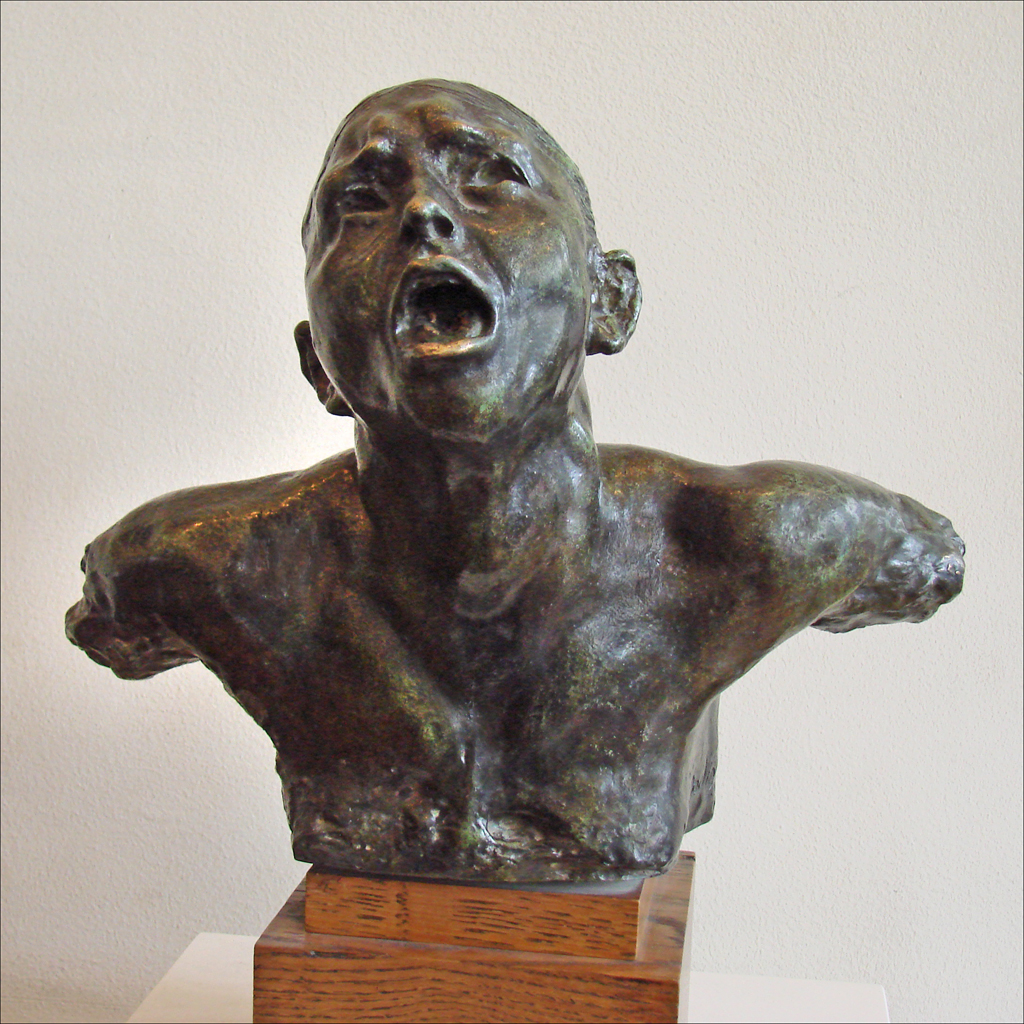
The Cry (1886)

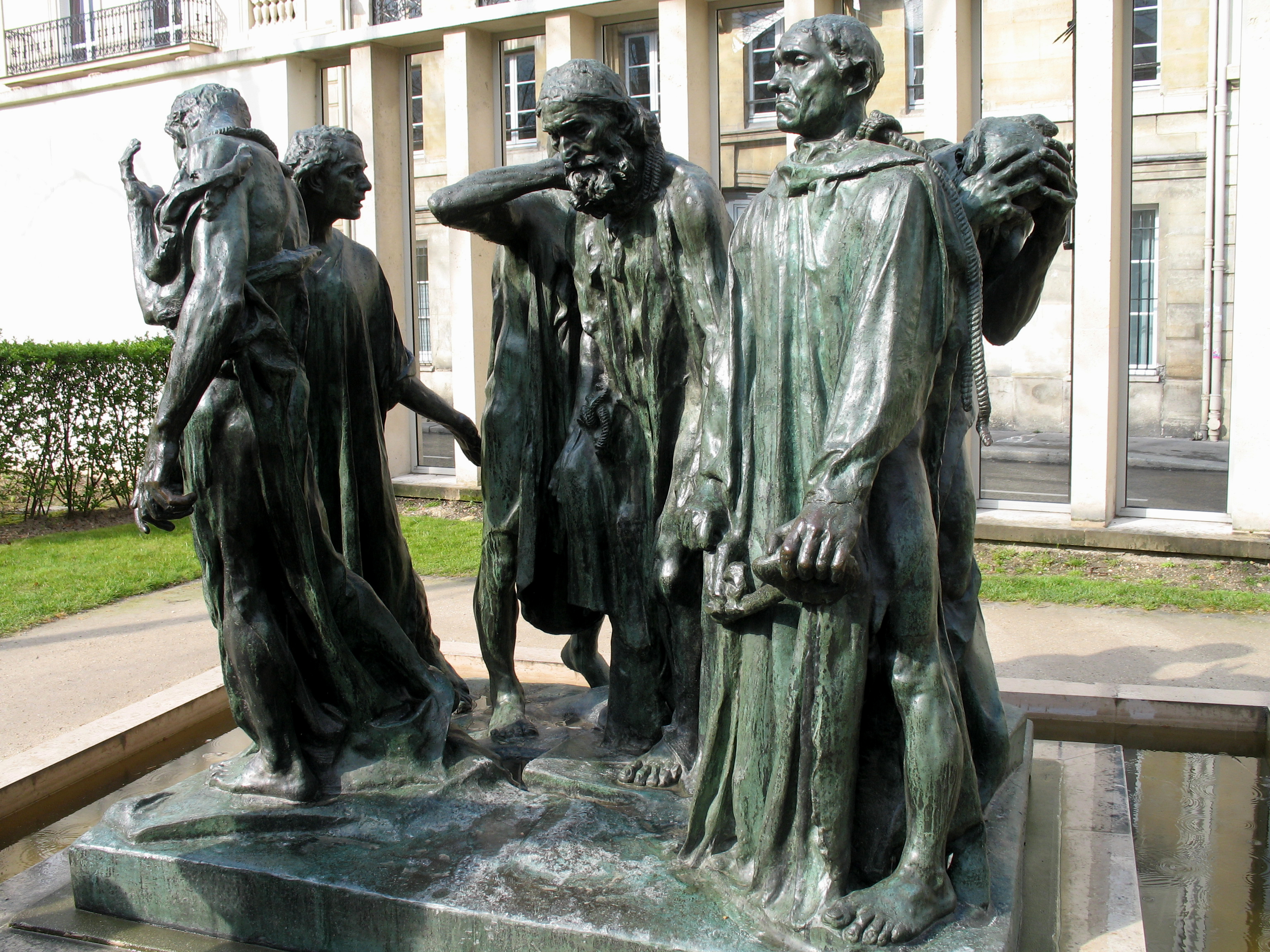
The Burghers of Calais (1889)

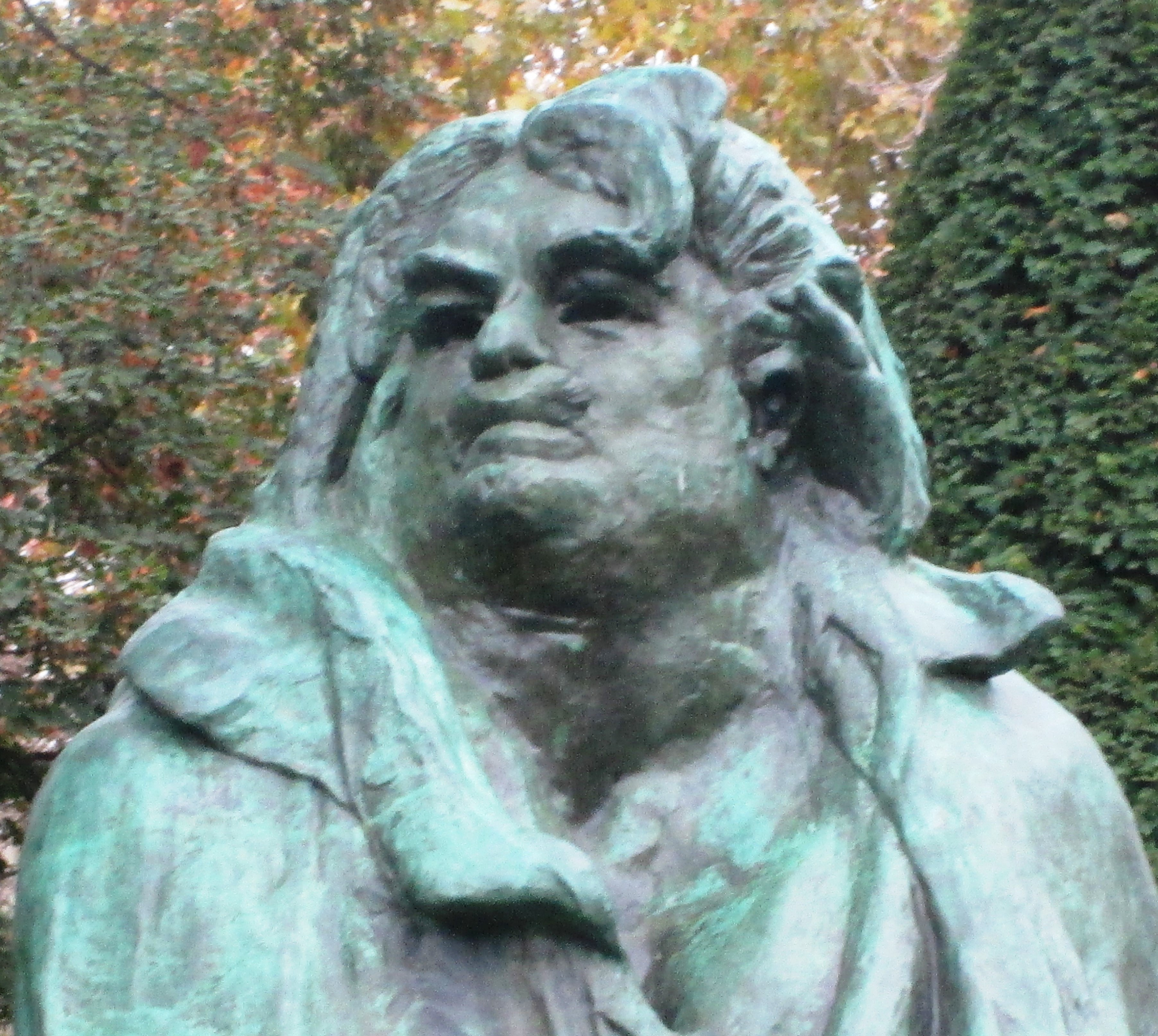
Monument to Balzac (detail, 1898)

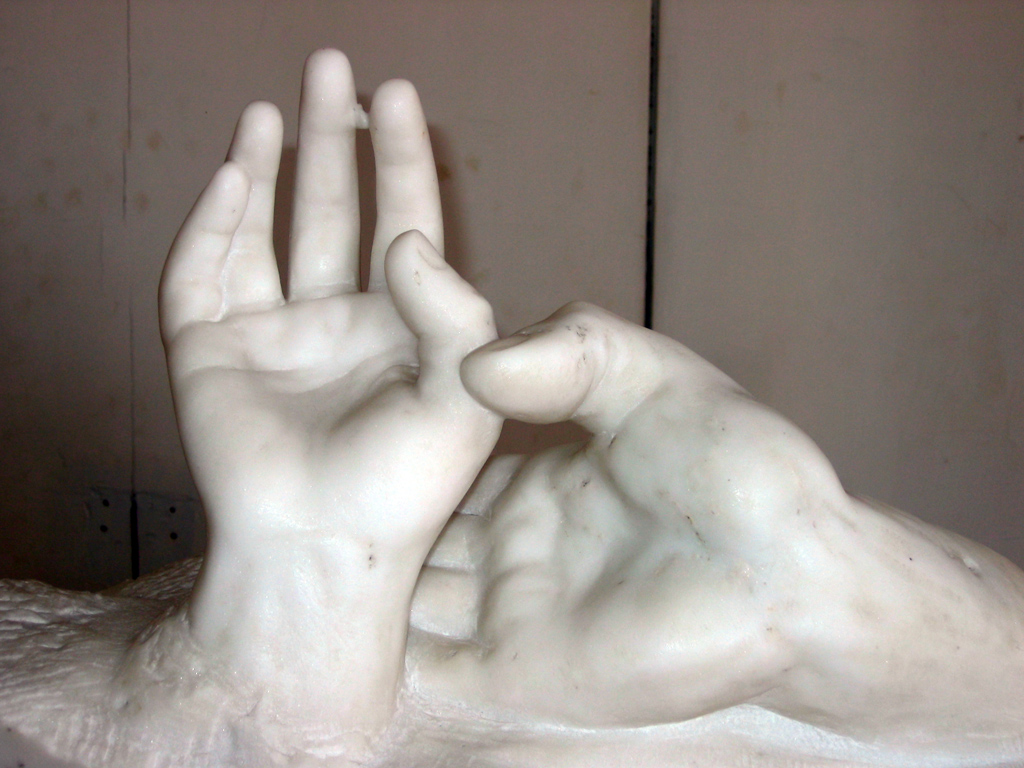
Lovers' Hands (1909)

The museum garden

== See also ==
- List of museums in Paris
- List of tourist attractions in Paris
- List of single-artist museums
- Musée Camille Claudel
