= Volubilis (sculptures) =

Series of marble sculptures by Alfred Boucher

Volubilis by Alfred Boucher.

Volubilis ("intertwined") is a series of marble sculptures by French sculptor Alfred Boucher (1850–1934), mentor to Camille Claudel and friend of Auguste Rodin.

First exhibited at the Salon in 1896 (probably the example in Musée des beaux-arts de Troyes), Volubilis appeared in several variations on the theme of the female body emerging from a roughly carved surround.

Boucher reworked the idea over many years. It was first explored three years before the 1896 exhibit in his Tete de Diane. The theme continues with Aux Champs exhibited in 1897. The sculptural potency of this format continued to intrigue Boucher, whose later revision in 1912 is entitled Le Rêve.

The concept of a beautiful creature evolving out of a piece of crudely carved rock is one of exciting contrasts, a kind of Pygmalion process whereby the sculptor's Muse comes alive, the sensuality heightened by the contrast between the unfinished and finished, the severity of the rock against the smoothness of the skin. It is achieved by carving in three-quarter relief, a method exploited by Boucher's contemporary and friend Auguste Rodin, but drawing its inspiration from Michelangelo's unfinished Slaves.

== Bibliography ==
Alfred Boucher, 1850–1934, sculpteur humaniste, Musée Camille Claudel, Nogent-sur-Seine, 27 May to 29 October 2000
