= Vivergo Fuels =

Chemical and animal feed plant at Saltend, East Riding of Yorkshire, England

- Industry: Bio-fuels manufacture Animal feeds
- Headquarters: Hessle, East Riding of Yorkshire, England
- Number of locations: 2
- Key people: Ben Hackett (Managing Director)
- Products: Bio-Ethanol High Protein Animal Feed Pellets
- Revenue: £42 million (2015–2016)
- Owners: Associated British Foods
- Number of employees: 150 (2018)
- Website: Official website

Vivergo Fuels was a bio-ethanol producer, headquartered in Hessle, East Riding of Yorkshire, with the main plant based at Salt End, Kingston upon Hull, England. The company produced bio-fuels from locally sourced wheat, as well as producing animal feed. It was the largest manufacturer of bio-ethanol in the United Kingdom and the second largest producer in Europe. Following the signing of the US-UK Economic Prosperity Deal, which removed 19% tariffs on imported ethanol from the United States, Vivergo was unable to compete with cheaper imported American ethanol, and the company ceased trading in August 2025.

== History ==
Vivergo was first proposed in 2007 as a joint venture between AB Sugar, BP and DuPont. The company had £350 million ($400 million) invested into it and opened for business in July 2013, with both AB Sugar and BP taking a 47% share and DuPont the remaining 6%. In May 2015, BP pulled out of the venture and sold its stake to AB Sugar, giving them 94% of the company.

The construction phase was beset by industrial action in March 2011; Vivergo had employed a company to build the plant, but it was behind schedule and so fired the company and sought another contractor to complete the task. This left 400 workers unemployed and the GMB union believed that Vivergo should continue to employ the workers whilst the search for a new contractor was completed. Redhall, a Wakefield-based company, was awarded the £18 million contract to design and build the plant in February 2010. The project was to have been completed by the end of 2010, but by the time of the industrial action, it was four months behind schedule. Redhall later successfully sued Vivergo for breach of contract.

The company receives over 1,100,000 tonnes (1,200,000 tons) of wheat per year and from that produces 420,000,000 litres (92,000,000 imp gal; 110,000,000 US gal) of bio-ethanol with 500,000 tonnes (550,000 tons) of animal feed as by-product. The wheat is sourced from over 900 farms across Yorkshire and Lincolnshire with the bulk coming from the East Riding of Yorkshire. Wheat sourced from this region is high in starch which makes it ideal to process into bio-ethanol. The animal feed is sold on to over 800 farms across the United Kingdom. When the plant was opened, Frontier Agriculture had an exclusive contract to supply the transport from farms to the Vivergo plant.

The plant was deliberately located on the Humber Estuary to take advantage of the ability of the east coast ports to export bulk liquids via ship-borne transport. Its location close to the major wheat producing areas in eastern England made it ideal. The next rival in terms of bio-fuels in the United Kingdom, is the Ensus plant on Teesside, which whilst producing less bio-ethanol and animal feed, also produces over 300,000 tonnes (330,000 tons) of carbon dioxide gas for the drinks industry, something that Vivergo does not. This makes Vivergo the largest producer of bio-ethanol in the United Kingdom and the second largest producer in Europe.

== Closure ==
In November 2017, the plant was temporarily closed by the company. Vivergo claimed that the business was unsustainable due to the government not adhering to its own Renewable Transport Fuel Obligation (RTFO) policy. At the time, the company produced E5, an up 5% blending product that is meant to be mixed with petrol in a 5:95% mix. Vivergo wished to produce E10, this would see an increase from 4.75% bio-fuels additives into petrol to 9.75% by 2020. After some government debate and agreement, the RTFO was adopted by the government, and was implemented in April 2018. The plant re-opened for business in April 2018 with E10 becoming law by 2020. The UK government mandated a 10% ethanol mix with petrol in 2021, which benefited the company.

In April 2025, Vivergo owner ABF said it was considering mothballing or closing the facility, blaming the move on the government “undermining” its viability by favouring imported ethanol products. In May 2025, the British Government signed a trade deal which removed tariffs on ethanol imported from the US. The owners stated that this would undercut their prices and make the plant unviable..The plant was closed by parent company Associated British Foods in August 2025, and Vivergo ceased trading.
