= Head of Camille Claudel =

Sculpture by Auguste Rodin

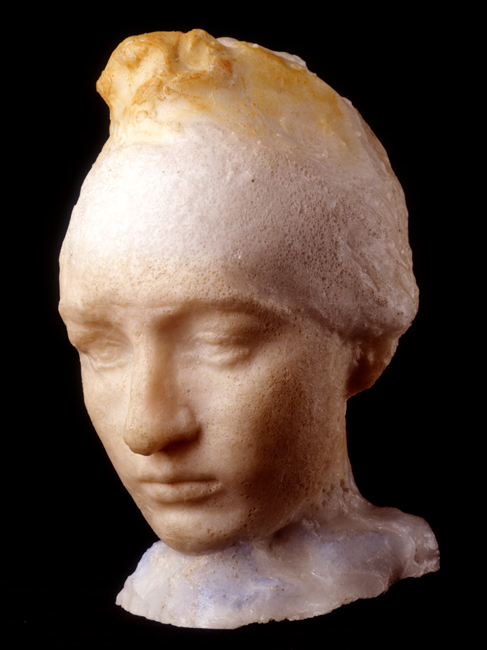
- Camille Claudel with Phrygian hat
- Artist: Auguste Rodin
- Year: 1911
- Medium: polychrome glass paste
- Dimensions: 24.8 cm × 25.8 cm × 17 cm (9.8 in × 10.2 in × 6.7 in)
- Location: Museo Soumaya, Mexico City

Head of Camille Claudel is a polychrome glass paste sculpture by the French artist Auguste Rodin, conceived in 1884 and executed in 1911. It is now in the Museo Soumaya in Mexico City. It shows his then studio assistant Camille Claudel in a Phrygian cap.

== Background ==
Claudel, a now-renowned sculptor, studied under Rodin's friend Alfred Boucher and then with Rodin. Rodin took over Boucher's classes, took Claudel on as a studio assistant, and they soon became associates and lovers. He produced the head during the early stages of their collaboration.

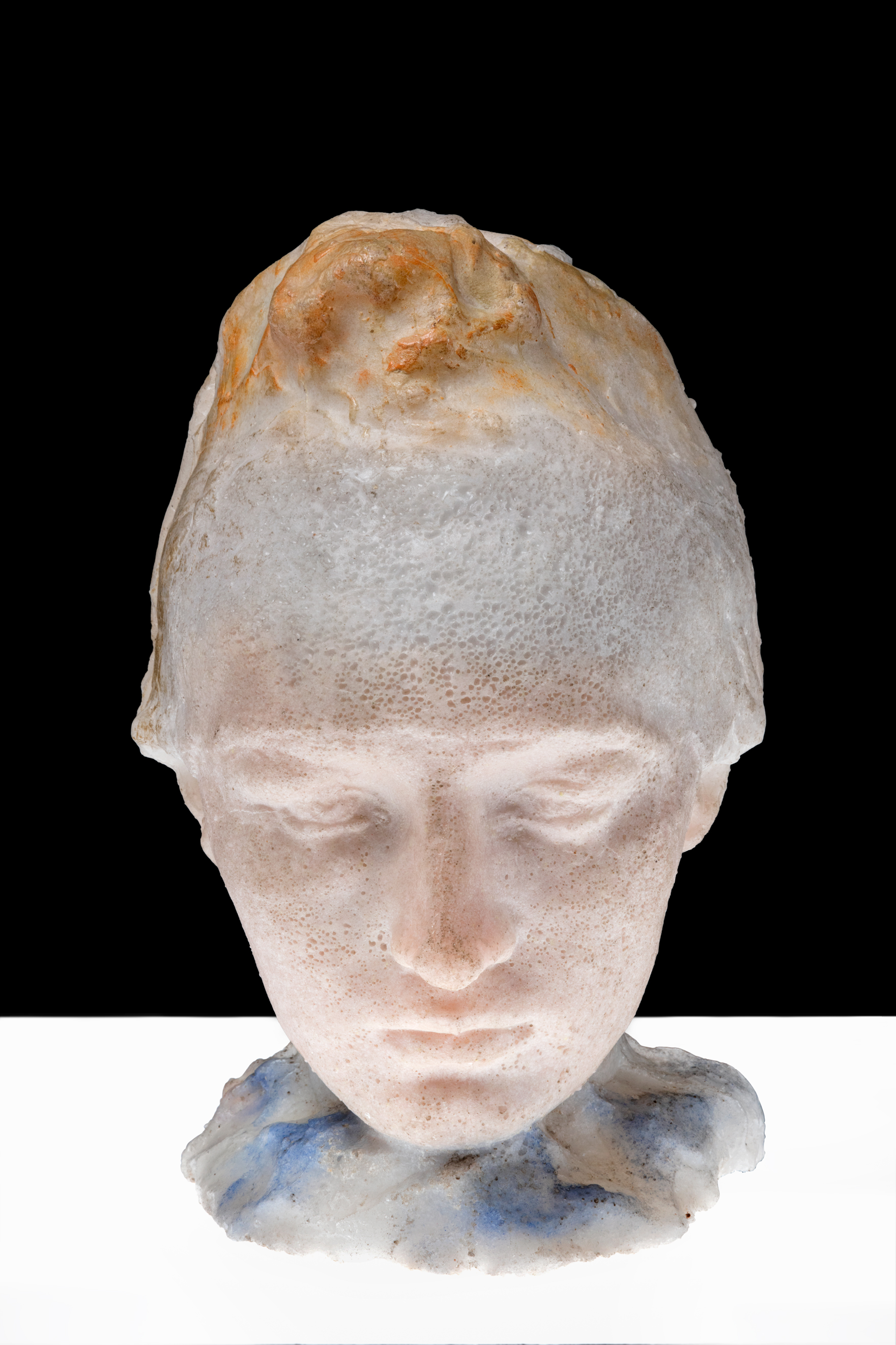
Front

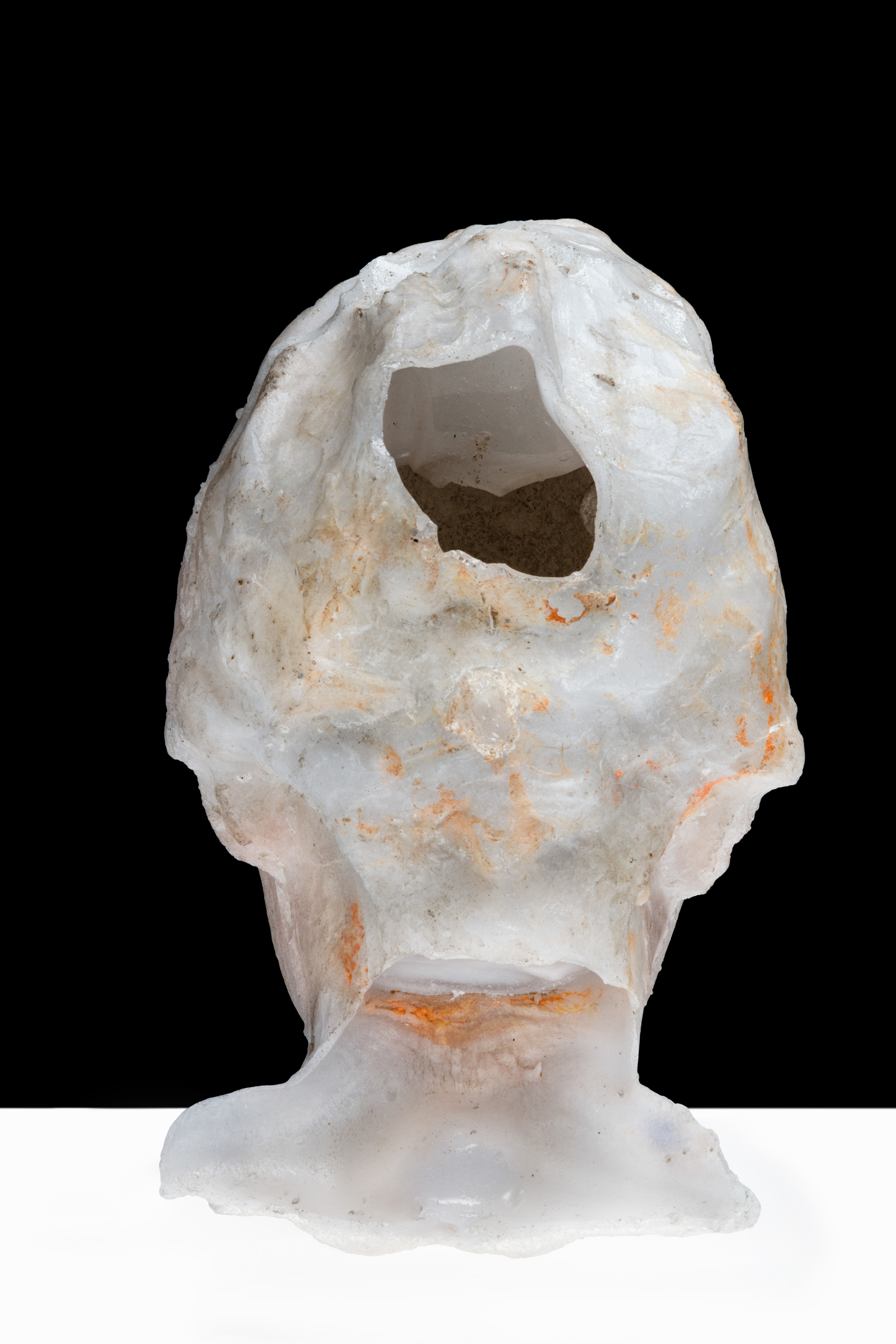
Back

== See also ==
- List of sculptures by Auguste Rodin
- List of sculptures by Camille Claudel
