= Michel Soufflet =

French industrialist (1930–2024)

- Born: Michel Jean Pierre Soufflet; 28 August 1930; Nogent-sur-Seine, France
- Died: 8 September 2024 (aged 94); Saint-Nicolas-la-Chapelle, Aube
- Citizenship: French
- Occupation: Industrialist
- Known for: Chairman of Supervisory Board of the Soufflet Group

Michel Soufflet (28 August 1930 – 8 September 2024) was a French industrialist and the Chairman of the Supervisory Board of his family company, the Soufflet Group, which is the largest miller of grain and producer of malt in France. In 2018, his fortune was reported as €1 billion.

== Early life ==
Michel Soufflet was born in 1930 in France. His parents were Jean Soufflet and Yvonne Juchat. His mother had inherited her family's small grain collecting business in Nogent-sur-Seine, and with Jean Soufflet developed this into the private limited company “Etablissements J. Soufflet”.

== Career ==
Michel Soufflet officially joined the company in 1947; at the time, it had only seven employees. He entered military service in 1948, and then returned to the business. By the time his father died in 1957, the company had expanded with a branch in North Africa, SARL Nord Africaine de produits alimentaires, and a malt production plant in Nogent-sur-Seine.

Upon taking over the business, he increased the customer portfolio, and diversified the company's business into selling agricultural supplies. He developed the roll-on service in 1962, in which trucks picked up and transported cereals directly from field to silo. After the Treaty of Rome opened up prospects for exporting within the EEC, he took the unusual course of exporting by sea, and built his own silo and export facilities at Rouen.

In 2000, Michel Soufflet passed the executive torch to his son Jean-Michel. Laurence Soufflet, his daughter, became Head of Communication.

== Other activities ==
Soufflet was Director of Secobra Recherche, Member of the specialist board of the France cereals sector (formerly ONIC), and Chairman of SYMEX (French export milling association).

He was a Knight of France's Order of Merit (1978), a Knight of France's Legion of Honour (1988), and recipient of the Commander of Merit in Agriculture (1997), and an officer of France's Legion of Honour (1999). He was awarded the Order of Franco-Russian Friendship by Vladimir Putin in June 2000.

== Death ==
Soufflet died on 8 September 2024, at the age of 94.
