= Octave Lebesgue =

French journalist and writer

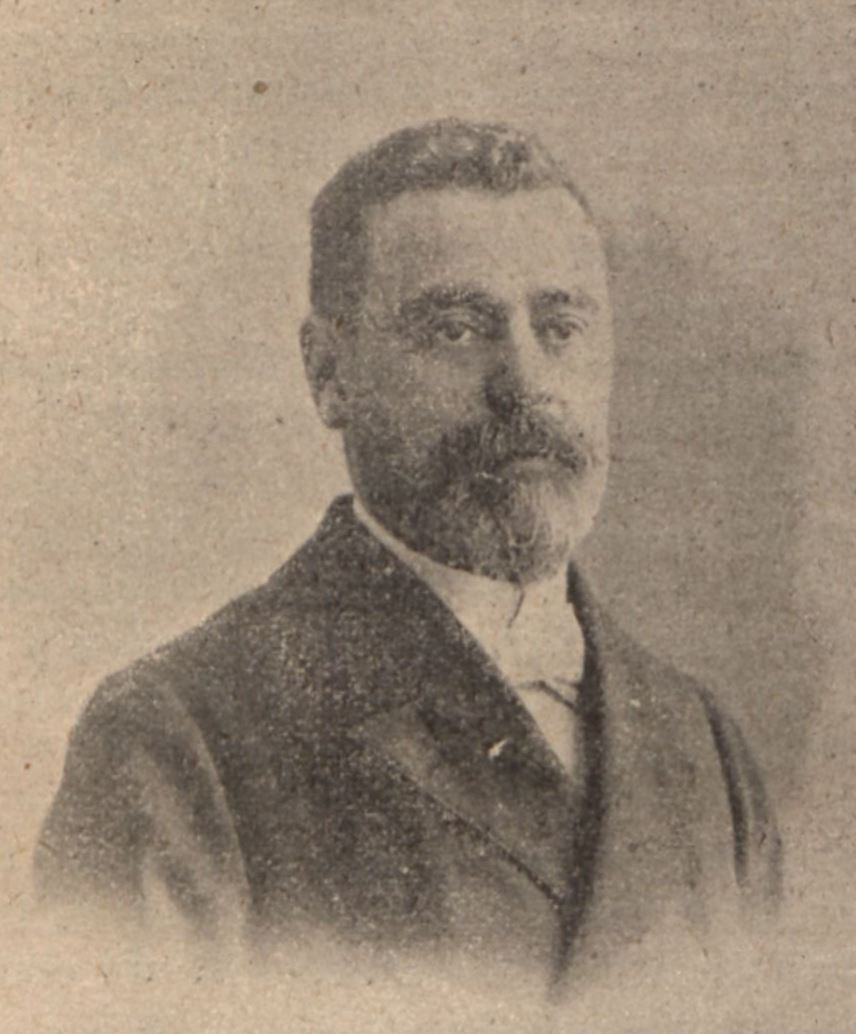
- Born: 5 November 1857; Paris, France
- Died: 24 April 1933 (aged 75); Paris, France
- Spouse: Laure Martin (m.1896)
- Writing career
- Pen name: Georges Montorgueil

Octave Lebesgue (French pronunciation: [ɔktav ləbɛɡ]; 5 November 1857, Paris – 24 April 1933, Paris) was a French journalist and writer. He is best known by the pseudonym Georges Montorgueil ([ʒɔʁʒ mɔ̃tɔʁɡœj]), though he also wrote as 'Jean Valjean' ([ʒɑ̃ valʒɑ̃]; after the protagonist of Les Misérables) and 'Caribert'. He also produced librettos for operas and musicals.

Beginning his career in Lyon, he later worked in Paris, notably on L'Écho de Paris. He contributed to the satirical weekly Le Courrier français. He rose to 'chef des informations' at L'Éclair and finally chief editor of Le Temps until his death. From 1900 onwards he edited L'Intermédiaire des chercheurs et curieux, a publication set up in 1864 to publish questions and answers on all subjects.

== Biography ==
He began his career in Lyon, then worked in Paris, notably at L'Écho de Paris. He became news editor at L'Éclair. He rose to the position of editor-in-chief at the newspaper Le Temps (Paris), where he worked until his death.

On September 25, 1896, he married Laure Martin, widow of Coutan. She was a talented sculptor, known as Laure Coutan-Montorgueil.

From 1900 onwards, he edited L'Intermédiaire des chercheurs et curieux, a publication founded in 1864. He used the pseudonyms Jean Valjan and Caribert, but remains known as Georges Montorgueil for having written numerous children's books, including those illustrated by Job (illustrator).

He is the author of opera librettos.

== Sources ==
- L'Intermédiaire des chercheurs et curieux. Octave Lebesgue
