= Witham St Hughs =

Village in Lincolnshire, England

Coordinates: 53.148366°N 0.669103°W

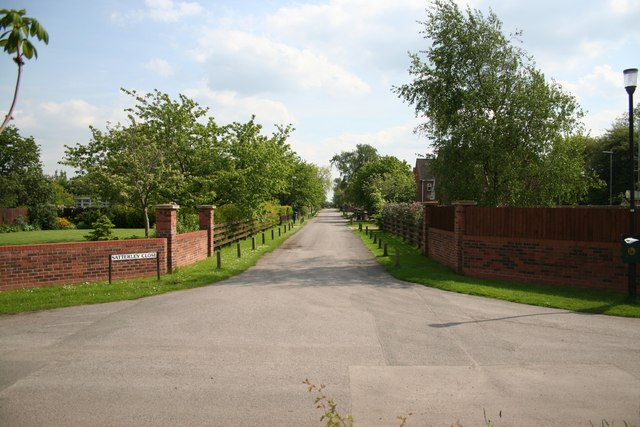
- Witham St Hughs

- Location within Lincolnshire
- Population: 2,346 (2011)
- OS grid reference: SK891620
  - London: 115 mi (185 km) SSE
- District: North Kesteven
- Shire county: Lincolnshire
- Region: East Midlands
- Country: England
- Sovereign state: United Kingdom
- Post town: Lincoln
- Postcode district: LN6
- Dialling code: 01522
- Police: Lincolnshire
- Fire: Lincolnshire
- Ambulance: East Midlands
- UK Parliament: Sleaford and North Hykeham

Witham St Hughs is a village in the Parish of Thurlby in the North Kesteven district of Lincolnshire, England. The population of the civil parish (including Thurlby) was 2,356 at the 2011 census. It is situated less than 0.54 miles (0.9 km) south from the A46 road, geographically 8 miles (13 km) south-west from the city of Lincoln, and 7 miles (11 km) north-east from the town of Newark-on-Trent.

Witham St Hughs has a primary school and community hall.

Businesses in Witham St Hughs include UK Mail, Limagrain, Germinal and Cargill. Frontier Agriculture, the UK's largest grain marketing business has its head office in Witham St Hughs.

There is a nursery in the precinct, a Co-op, a beauty & hair salon and two takeaway restaurants. There are infrequent bus services to Lincoln and Newark.
