= Frontier Agriculture =

UK company

Frontier Agriculture Ltd
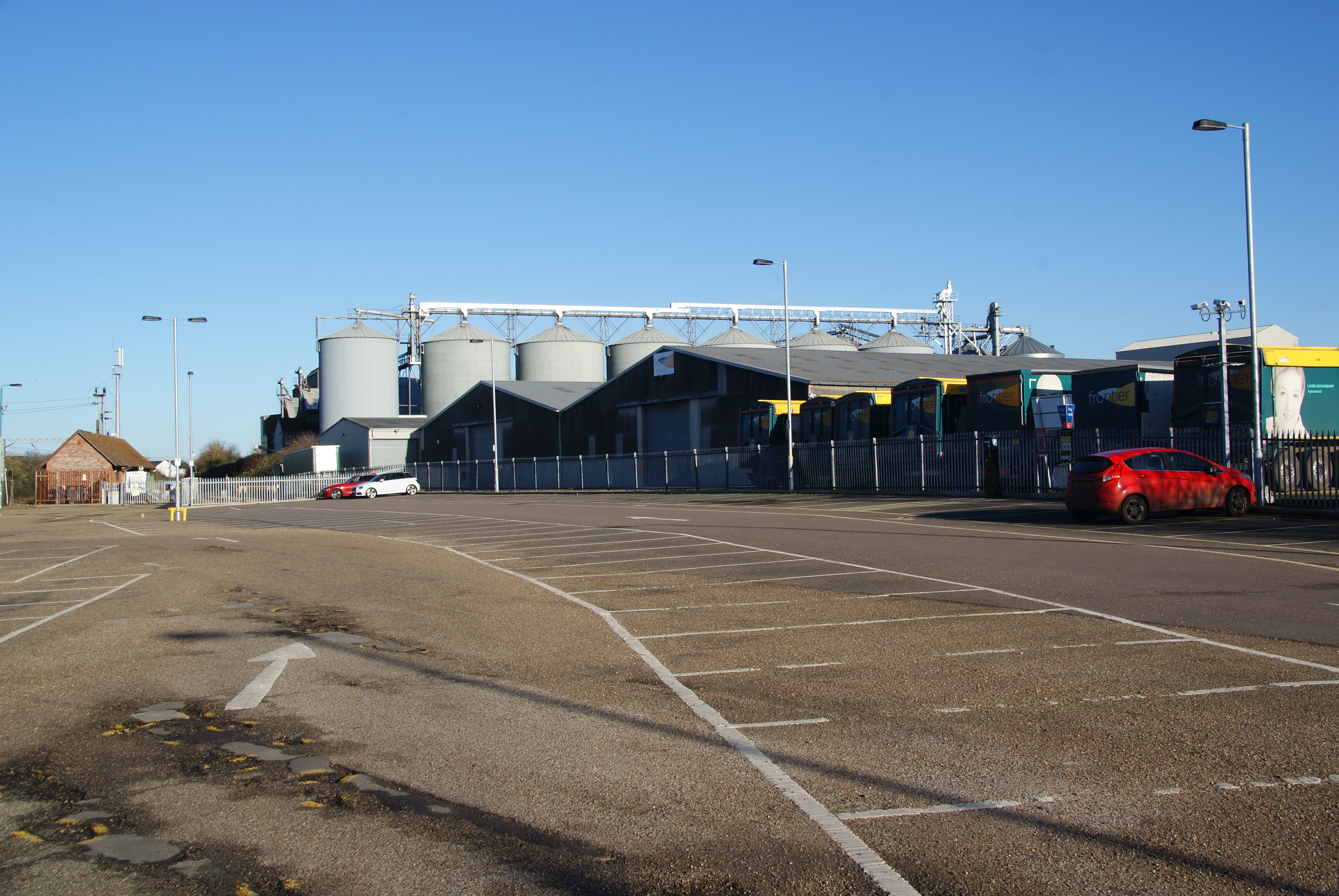
- Diss Site, Norfolk. 2013
- Company type: Private
- Industry: Arable agriculture
- Founded: April 2005
- Headquarters: Witham St Hughs, Lincoln LN6 9TN
- Area served: UK
- Key people: Mark Aitchison; Managing Director
- Products: Grain marketing & crop production
- Revenue: c. £1.5 billion
- Number of employees: c.1100
- Parent: ABF Holdings Ltd, Cargill plc
- Website: Frontier Agriculture

Frontier Agriculture Ltd is the UK's largest crop production and grain marketing business, jointly owned by Associated British Foods and Cargill plc.

Frontier has a market share of 20% of the grain market, trades around 5,000,000 tonnes (5,500,000 tons) of grain per year, and has an annual turnover in excess of £1.5 billion. The Frontier seed business supplies 65,000 tonnes (72,000 tons) of seed to UK farmers. Frontier has 46 sites across the UK and employs more than 1,100 colleagues. They manage 160 agronomists, 1,900,000 acres (750,000 ha) of land, and are supported by a national trials programme comprising 12,000 replicated plots. Frontier is the largest UK distributor of fertiliser.

Frontier has several divisions providing additional specialist advice to growers. These include SOYL precision crop production and Kings, who are experts on game cover, conservation crops, green cover and forage crops. Nomix is one of the UK's suppliers of weed control products and technical support services for amenity and industrial weed control.

Frontier's main offices are in Perth, Berwick-upon-Tweed, Cranswick, Witham St Hughs, Diss, Sandy, Hermitage and Ross-on-Wye.

== History ==
Allied Grain (owned by Associated British Foods) and Banks Cargill Agriculture merged in April 2005 under the direction of David Irwin (MD Allied Grain) to form Frontier Agriculture. Allied Grain was based in Norfolk. Banks Cargill Agriculture was formed in February 2001 between Cargill and Sidney C Banks, a UK grain trader based in Sandy.

Following Cargill's merger with Banks Agriculture, Mark Aitchison was appointed MD of the newly formed business.

In February 2012, Frontier announced that it had acquired TAP (The Agronomy Partnership), a specialist agronomy business based in Kent, consisting of a team of four crop Production specialists across Kent, Surrey and Sussex.

Frontier and a mobile seed cleaning business, formed a joint venture operation in 2013, to process and market seed in the East Midlands. Under the arrangement, GFP operates as a separate independent entity with Frontier taking a significant stake in the business. GFP is a seed specialist located in Lincolnshire. The business was formed in 2010 with the merger of Phillips Seeds Ltd and Gibson & Faulding Ltd.

In 2014, Frontier Agriculture acquired GH2, the parent company of Grain Harvesters. Kent-based Grain Harvesters was established in 1947, and has built up a customer base across south-east England.

Since 2004 Frontier has owned 50% of Southampton Grain Terminal (SGT), with the other 50% owned by The Soufflet Group. Frontier acquired of the 100% shareholding in SGT in 2021. This was followed by an immediate investment of £5 million in a new ship loader and infrastructure upgrade.

Frontier is a founding investor in the agricultural bank Oxbury, launched in February 2021. Oxbury is the UK's only specialist agricultural bank and the only bank with a singular focus on the rural economy.

On 20 October 2021, Frontier acquired Yagro as a standalone independent subsidiary of the Frontier Group. YAGRO is a provider of data analytics for the UK agricultural industry and was founded in 2015 by Richard Sears, Gareth Davies (CEO) and Dan Jolly.

Also in October 2021, work began to build the largest oat-processing facility in Europe, a joint venture between Frontier, a farmer-owned cooperative, and Anglia Maltings Holdings (AMH), a food and drink ingredient manufacturer. The site of the new mill is a key arable region between Corby and Kettering in Northamptonshire.
