= Alfred Boucher =

French sculptor

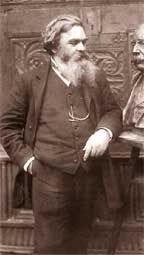
- Born: 23 September 1850; Nogent-sur-Seine, France
- Died: 1934 (aged 83–84); Aix-les-Bains, France

Alfred Boucher (23 September 1850 – 1934) was a French sculptor who was a mentor to Camille Claudel and a friend of Auguste Rodin.

== Biography ==
Born in Bouy-sur-Ovin (Nogent-sur-Seine), he was the son of a farmhand who became the gardener of the sculptor Joseph-Marius Ramus. After recognizing Boucher's talent, the sculptor opened his studio to the young man.

Boucher won the Grand Prix du Salon in 1881 with La Piété Filiale. For seversl years he practiced his art and also taught aspiring sculptors. He moved to Florence for a long period, where he became a favourite sculptor of presidents and royalty, such as George I of Greece and Maria-Pia of Romania.

While living in Paris, Boucher gave free teaching to selected students. He provided inspiration and encouragement to the next generation of sculptors, such as Laure Coutan, Jessie Lipscomb, Amy Singer, and Camille Claudel. He depicted the latter in Camille Claudel lisant. Later Claudel in turn sculpted a bust of her mentor.

Before moving to Florence and after having taught Claudel and others for more than three years in Paris, Boucher asked his friend and sculptor Auguste Rodin to take over the instruction of his pupils. This is how Auguste Rodin and Claudel met. Their tumultuous and passionate relationship soon began.

Boucher founded the studio La Ruche in Montparnasse in 1902 to help young artists. He received the Grand Prix de sculpture de l'Exposition Universelle in 1900. He died in Aix-les-Bains at the age of 84.

== Gallery ==
Volubilis by Alfred Boucher

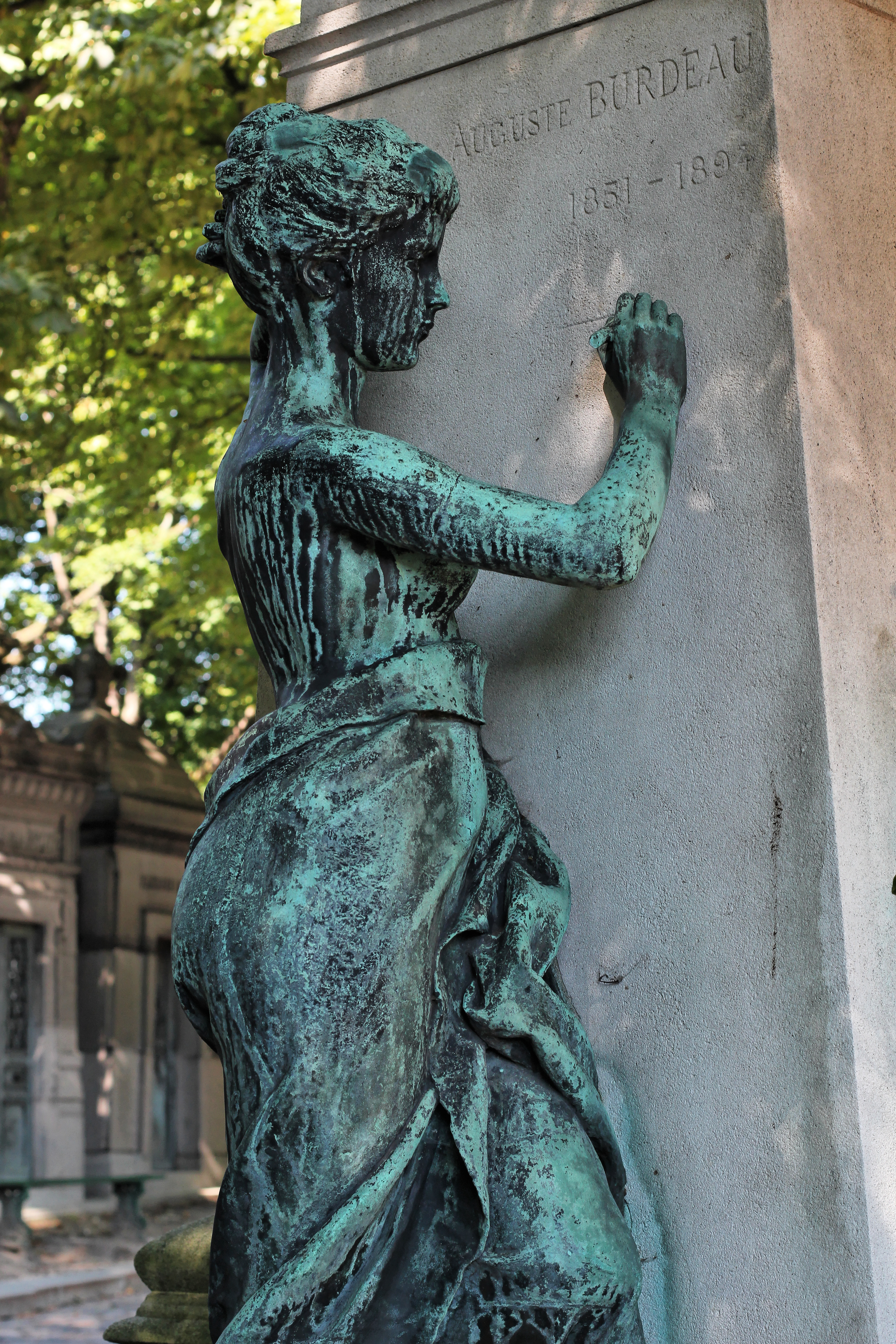
Tomb of Auguste Burdeau (1851-1894)

A statuette of Joan of Arc was featured on an episode of Antique Road Show.

== See also ==
- Volubilis by Alfred Boucher

== Exhibitions ==
- Camille Claudel révélée..., sculpture by Alfred Boucher and Auguste Rodin, Nogent-sur-Seine, Agora Michel Baroin,

May 2003.

- Alfred Boucher, 1850–1934, sculpteur humaniste, Musée Paul Dubois-Alfred Boucher, Nogent-sur-Seine, 27 May to 29 October 2000, (catalogue available with text by Jacques Piette, conservateur du musée municipal Paul Dubois – Alfred Boucher)
