= Nogent Nuclear Power Plant =

Power Plant in France

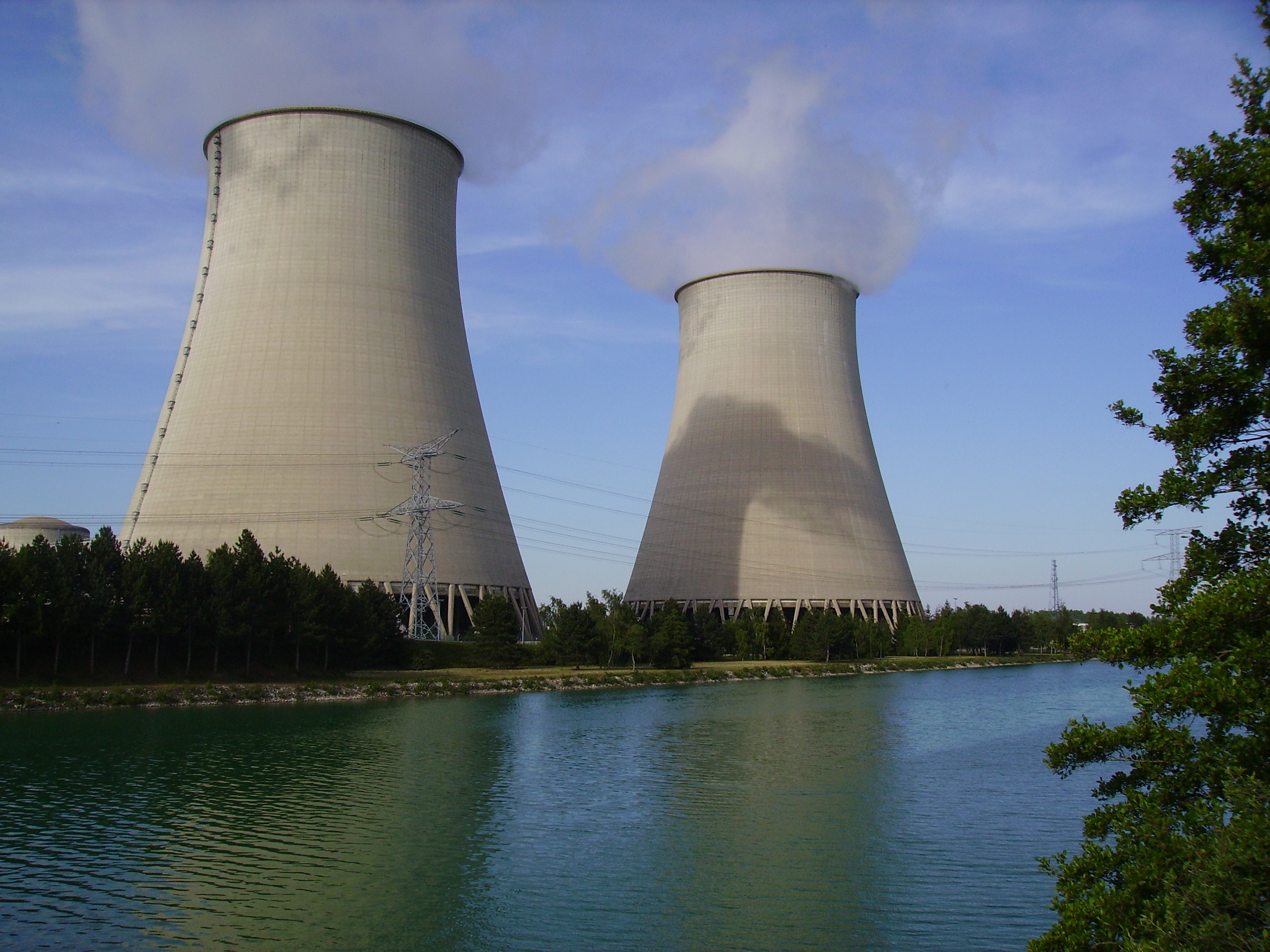
- Nuclear Power Plant Nogent
- Official name: Centrale Nucléaire de Nogent
- Country: France
- Location: Nogent-sur-Seine
- Coordinates: 48°30′55″N 03°31′04″E
- Status: Operational
- Construction began: 1981
- Commission date: 21 October 1987; 39 years ago
- Operator: EDF

Nuclear power station
- Reactor type: PWR
- Reactor supplier: Framatome
- Cooling towers: 2 × Natural Draft
- Cooling source: Seine River

Power generation
- Units operational: 2 × 1363 MW
- Make and model: Alstom
- Nameplate capacity: 2726 MW
- Capacity factor: 81.0%
- Annual net output: 19,331 GW·h

External links
- Website: www.edf.com
- Commons: Related media on Commons

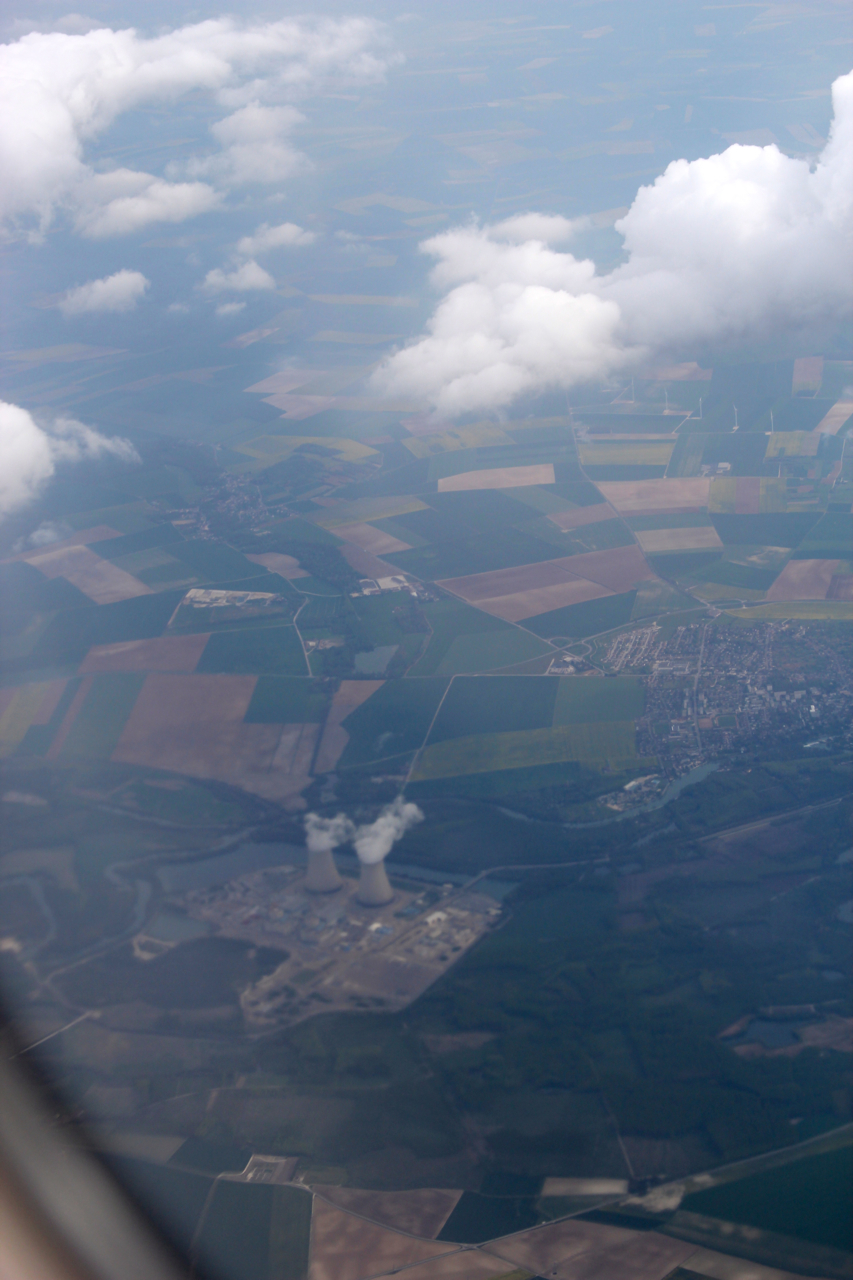
Aerial view

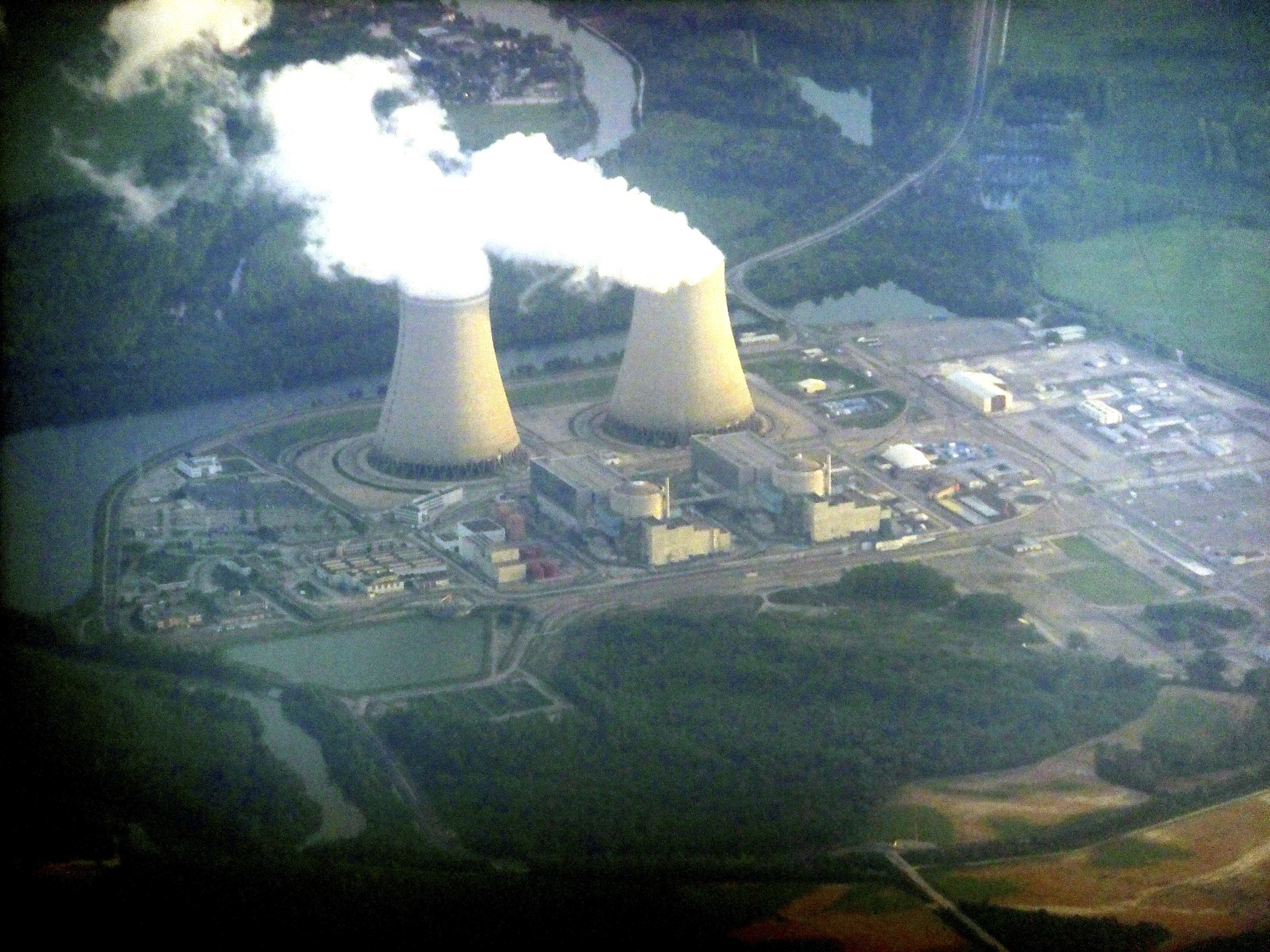
The plant as seen from an airliner en route to Paris

The Nogent Nuclear Power Plant is located in the French commune of Nogent-sur-Seine, on the right bank of the Seine, in the west of the Aube department. It is located 60 kilometres (37 mi) to the west of Troyes and 120 kilometres (75 mi) south-east of Paris.

The plant houses two reactors each of 1300 MWe and the site has a total area of 100 hectares. Each reactor has its own cooling tower 165 metres (541 ft) high.

It produces about a third of the yearly electricity consumption of Île-de-France and employs around 700 regular workers.

== Events ==
- A fire drill on 2 October 2001 by the Nuclear Safety Authority of France confirmed that it took about 50 minutes between the time of the drill the time the second team responded.
- On 30 September 2005, water was accidentally sprayed on electrical cabinets; the reactor was automatically stopped. Nobody was injured and there were no radiation releases. It was classified as level 1 on the INES scale.

On 5 December 2011, nine Greenpeace anti-nuclear activists cut through a fence at the Nogent Nuclear Power Plant. They scaled the roof of the domed reactor building and unfurled a "Safe Nuclear Doesn't Exist" banner before attracting the attention of security guards. Two activists remained at large for four hours.
