= L'Intermédiaire des chercheurs et curieux =

French magazine

- ICC in 1864
- Editor: Charles-Henri de Sommyèvre
- Former editors: Philippe Houël de Chaulieu
- Frequency: Monthly (11 issues per year)
- Publisher: Charles-Henri de Sommyèvre
- Founder: Carle de Rash (Charles Read)
- Founded: 1864
- Company: ICC Editions
- Country: France
- Based in: Paris
- Language: French
- Website: icc-edition.fr
- ISSN: 0994-4532
- OCLC: 980954198

L'Intermédiaire des chercheurs et curieux (French pronunciation: [lɛ̃tɛʁmedjɛʁ de ʃɛʁʃœʁ e kyʁjø], lit. 'The Intermediary of Researchers and the Curious'), abbreviated as ICC, was a monthly French magazine consisting of questions and answers of its readers on various encyclopedic topics. It focused mainly on art, history, genealogy, literature, and religions.

== History ==
The magazine appeared from 1864 to 1940. Initially it focused on the arts and all sciences. It reappeared in April 1951, first under a slightly different name.

A high-ranking official of Scottish origin, Charles Read, under the pseudonym of Carle de Rash, was the founder and the first director. He took as a model the Notes and Queries, published in London, and based it on the same principle. Genealogical and nobility issues gained in importance following the reappearance in 1951.

Since 1981 ICC is not published in September, reducing the number of issues from 12 to 11 per year. It seized publication in 2016.

=== Editors ===
- Octave Lebesgue (1900–1931)
- Philippe du Puy de Clinchamps (1913–1971), founder of the new series in 1951
- Lucien Boisnormand
- Patrice du Puy de Clinchamps, son of Philippe
- Philippe Houël de Chaulieu
- Charles-Henri de Sommyèvre

=== Other contributors ===
- Paul Masson, between 1879 and 1895
- Gustave Bord

=== Price ===
The ICC was sold by annual subscription:

- 1985: 400 French francs
- 1990: 485 French francs
- 1995: 608 French francs
- 2000: 635 French francs
- 2012: 99 Euro
