= Camille Claudel =

French sculptor and graphic artist (1864–1943)

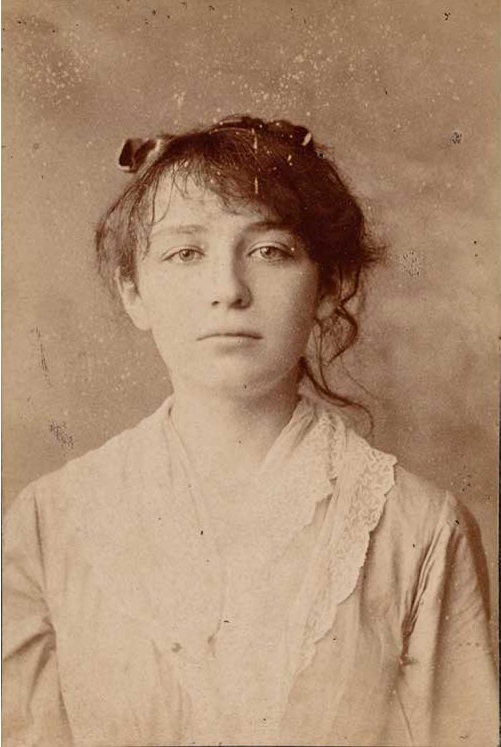
- Claudel sometime before 1883
- Born: Camille Rosalie Claudel; 8 December 1864; Fère-en-Tardenois, Aisne, Second French Empire
- Died: 19 October 1943 (aged 78); Montdevergues, Vaucluse, German occupied France
- Education: Académie Colarossi
- Occupation: Sculptor
- Known for: Figurative artwork in bronze and marble
- Notable work: Sakuntala; The Waltz; The Mature Age; List of sculptures
- Relatives: Paul Claudel (brother), Louise Jeanne Claudel (sister)

Signature
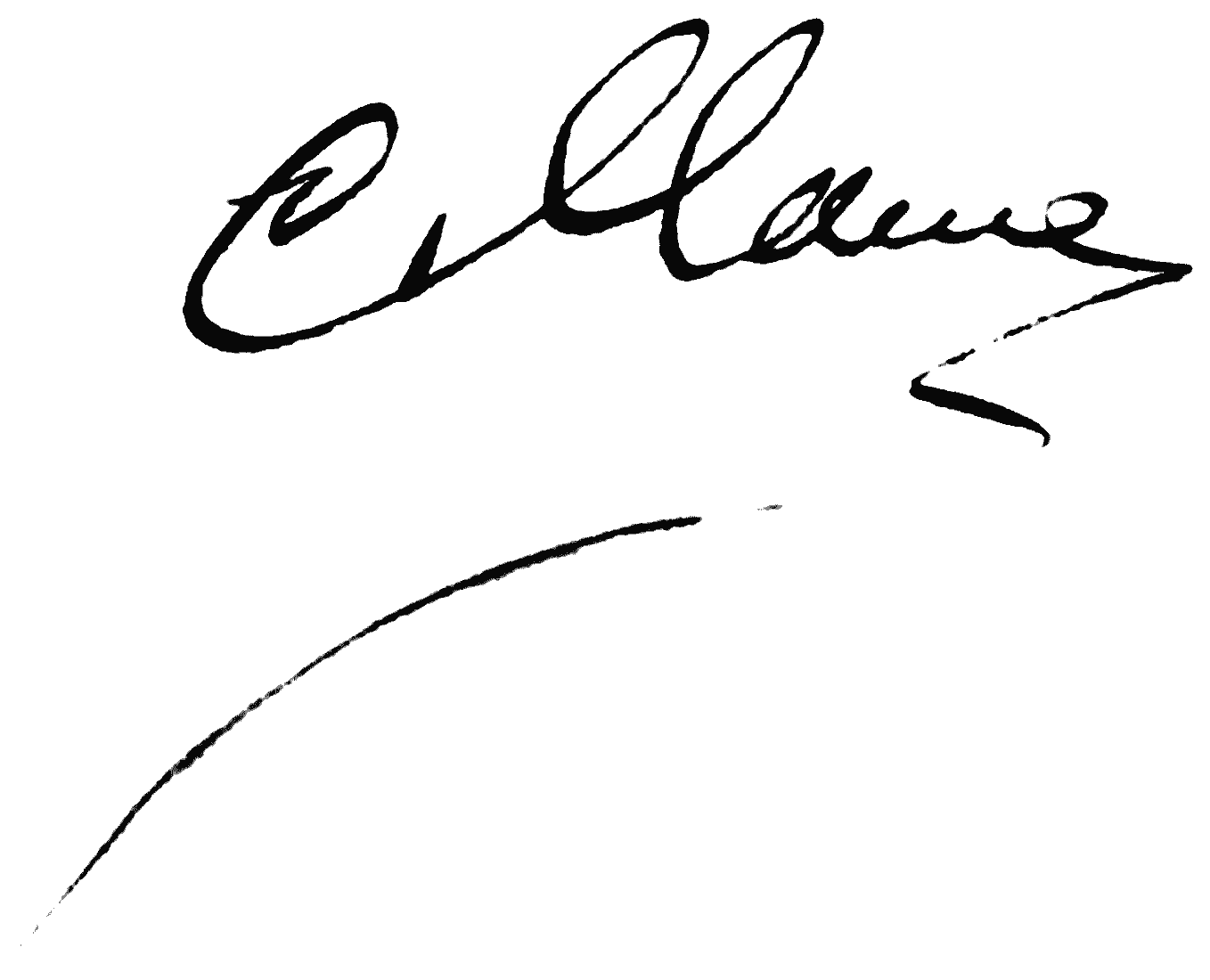

Camille Rosalie Claudel (French pronunciation: [kamij klodɛl]; 8 December 1864 – 19 October 1943) was a French sculptor known for her figurative works in bronze and marble. She died in relative obscurity. Later in the 20th century, she gained renewed attention and recognition for the originality and quality of her work.

Since that time, she has been the subject of several biographies and films. Claudel is well known for her sculptures, including The Waltz and The Mature Age.

The Camille Claudel Museum was established in Nogent-sur-Seine, where she lived as a teenager. It opened in 2017. Claudel was a longtime associate of sculptor Auguste Rodin, and the Musée Rodin in Paris has a room dedicated to her works.

Sculptures created by Claudel are also held in the collections of several major museums including the Musée d'Orsay in Paris, the Courtauld Institute of Art in London, the Art Institute of Chicago, the National Museum of Women in the Arts in Washington, D.C., the Metropolitan Museum of Art in New York City, the Philadelphia Museum of Art, and the J. Paul Getty Museum in Los Angeles.

== Early years ==
Camille Claudel was born in Fère-en-Tardenois, Aisne, in northern France, the first child of a family of farmers and gentry. Her father, Louis-Prosper Claudel, dealt in mortgages and bank transactions. Her mother, the former Louise-Athanaïse Cécile Cerveaux, came from a Champagne family of Catholic farmers and priests. The family moved to Villeneuve-sur-Fère while Camille was still a baby. Her younger brother Paul Claudel was born there in 1868. Subsequently, they moved to Bar-le-Duc (1870), Nogent-sur-Seine (1876), and Wassy-sur-Blaise (1879), although they continued to spend summers in Villeneuve-sur-Fère. The stark landscape of that region made a deep impression on the children.

From the ages of five to 12 Claudel was educated by the Sisters of Christian Doctrine. While living in Nogent-sur-Seine at age 12, Claudel began working with the local clay, regularly sculpting the human form. As Camille grew older, she enriched her artistic education with literature and the study of old engravings. Her mother Louise did not approve of Claudel's "unladylike desire to become an artist." But her father was more supportive and took examples of her artwork to their artist neighbor Alfred Boucher, to assess her abilities. Boucher later moved to Paris and had a successful career as a sculptor. Boucher confirmed that Claudel was a capable, talented artist and encouraged her family to support her study of sculpture. Camille’s family provided her with the same education as her brother, leading her to reach the limitation in facilities in the area.

In 1881 Louise took Claudel, her brother, and younger sister to Paris, where they lived in the Montparnasse area. The children would have more education there. Her father remained behind in the north, working to support them.

== Creative period ==
=== Study with Alfred Boucher ===
Claudel was fascinated with stone and soil as a child. As a young woman in Paris she studied at the Académie Colarossi, one of the few places open to female students. She also studied with sculptor Alfred Boucher, who gave free classes to her and some other students. The Académie Colarossi was more progressive than other arts institutions in that it not only allowed female students at the school but also permitted them to work from nude male models. At the time, the École des Beaux-Arts barred women from enrolling to study.

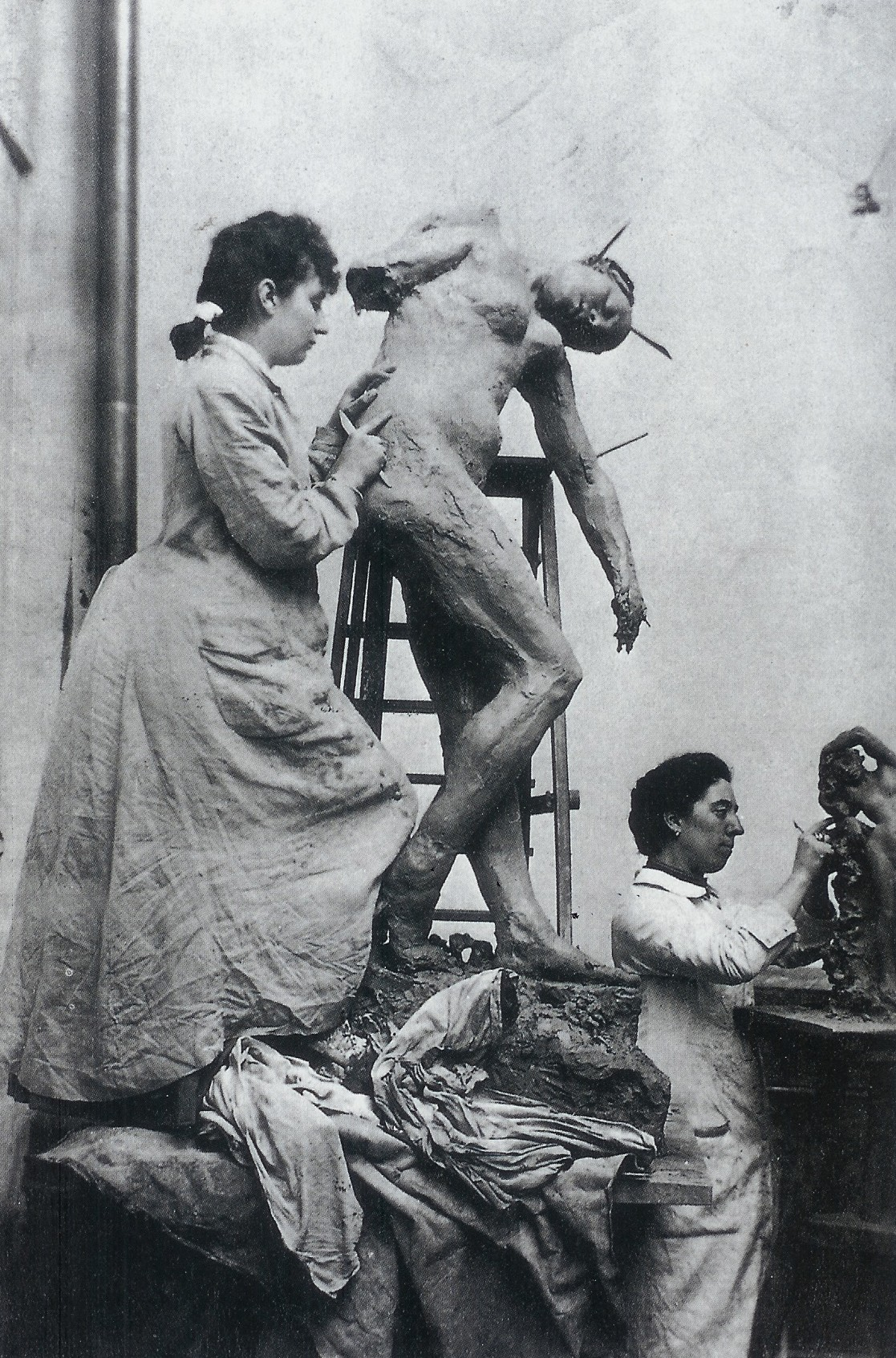
Camille Claudel (left) and sculptor Jessie Lipscomb in their Paris studio in the mid-1880s

In 1882, Claudel rented a studio workshop on rue Notre-Dame des Champs in Paris that she shared with three British sculptors: Jessie Lipscomb, Emily Fawcett, and Amy Singer. The latter was the daughter of John Webb Singer, whose foundry in Frome, Somerset, made large-scale bronze statues. Boucher often came by the studio, giving free lessons to the four sculptors multiple times a week. Several prominent works produced in Frome are in London, including the Boadicea group on the Embankment; statue of Oliver Cromwell, which graces the lawn in front of the Houses of Parliament; and F.W. Pomeroy's figure of Lady Justice atop the Old Bailey. The memorial statue of General Gordon on his camel at Brompton Barracks was also cast in Frome. This foundry also cast the eight lions that form part of the Rhodes Memorial in Cape Town, South Africa. Claudel visited Frome and the families of her fellow sculptors. All of these English friends had studied at the South Kensington Schools – which would become the Royal College of Art – before moving to Paris to be at the Academie Colarossi, where they all met. Claudel prolonged her stay with Singer's family in Frome.

Alfred Boucher became Claudel's mentor, and also provided inspiration and encouragement to the next generation of sculptors, such as Laure Coutan. Claudel was depicted by Boucher in Camille Claudel lisant. Later, she sculpted a bust of her mentor. After teaching Claudel and the other sculptors for more than three years, Boucher moved to Florence following an award for the Grand Prix du Salon. Before he left, he asked Auguste Rodin to take over the instruction of his pupils. Rodin and Claudel met, and their artistic association and a tumultuous and passionate relationship soon began.

=== Auguste Rodin ===
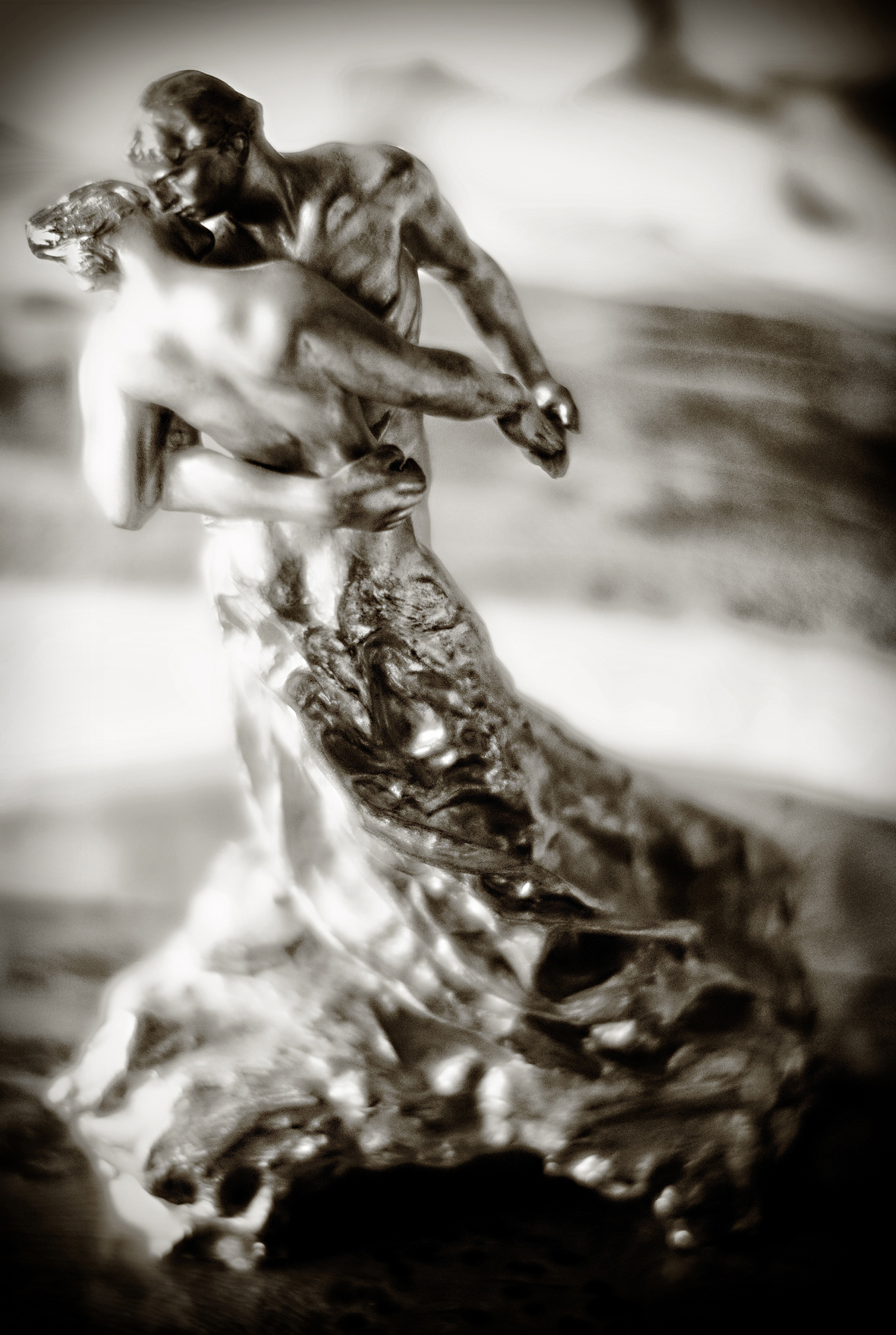
The Waltz, conceived in 1889 and cast in 1905

Claudel started working in Rodin's workshop in 1883 and became a source of inspiration for him. Under Rodin’s guidance, Claudel was able to perfect her own work in a variety of materials such as plaster, bronze, marble, and onyx. She acted as his model, his confidante, and his lover. She never lived with Rodin, who was reluctant to end his 20-year relationship with common-law wife Rose Beuret. Knowledge of the affair agitated her family, especially her mother, who already detested her for not being a boy and never approved of Claudel's involvement in the arts. As a consequence, she forced Claudel to leave the family home.

In 1891, Claudel served as a jurist at the National Society of Fine Arts, reported to be "something of a boys' club at the time." In 1892, after an abortion, Claudel ended the intimate aspect of her relationship with Rodin, although they saw each other regularly until 1898. Le Cornec and Pollock state that after the sculptors' physical relationship ended, Claudel was not able to get the funding to realise many of her daring ideas. There was sex-based censorship and her work had a sexual element too daring for the time. Claudel thus had either to depend on Rodin or to collaborate with him, and see him get the credit as the lionised figure of French sculpture. She also depended on him financially, especially after her loving and wealthy father's death. Her mother and brother, who disapproved of her lifestyle, maintained control of the family fortune and left her to wander the streets dressed in beggars' clothing.

Claudel's reputation survived, not because of her once notorious association with Rodin, but because of her work. The novelist and art critic Octave Mirbeau described her as "A revolt against nature: a woman genius." Her early work is similar to Rodin's in spirit but shows imagination and lyricism quite her own, particularly in the famous The Waltz (1893).

The contemporary French critic Louis Vauxcelles stated that Claudel was the only sculptress on whose forehead shone the sign of genius like that of Berthe Morisot, the only well-known female painter of the century. He said Claudel's style was more virile than that of many of her male colleagues. Others, like Morhardt and Caranfa, concurred, saying that the two artists had become so different, with Rodin being softer and more delicate, and Claudel being vehement with vigorous contrasts. They suggested such differences may have contributed to the sculptors' break up. Claudel ultimately became Rodin's rival.

As historian Farah Peterson noted in 2024, Claudel's Clotho, exhibited at the 1893 Salon of the Société Nationale des Beaux-Arts, serves as an "important example of how sharply Claudel’s vision diverged from Rodin’s." Claudel depicted Clotho, one of the Three Fates in Greco-Roman mythology responsible for deciding human destiny, as a very elderly woman. Unlike Rodin and other male artists of the time, Claudel "did not shy away from exploring the female grotesque;" indeed, "she could find power in grotesquerie." In this way, Clotho can be seen as exemplifying something rare and exhilarating: an "utter indifference to the male gaze." Claudel's onyx and bronze small-scale La Vague (The Wave) (1897) was also a conscious break in style from her Rodin period. It has a decorative quality quite different from the "heroic" feeling of her earlier work.

=== The Mature Age and other works ===
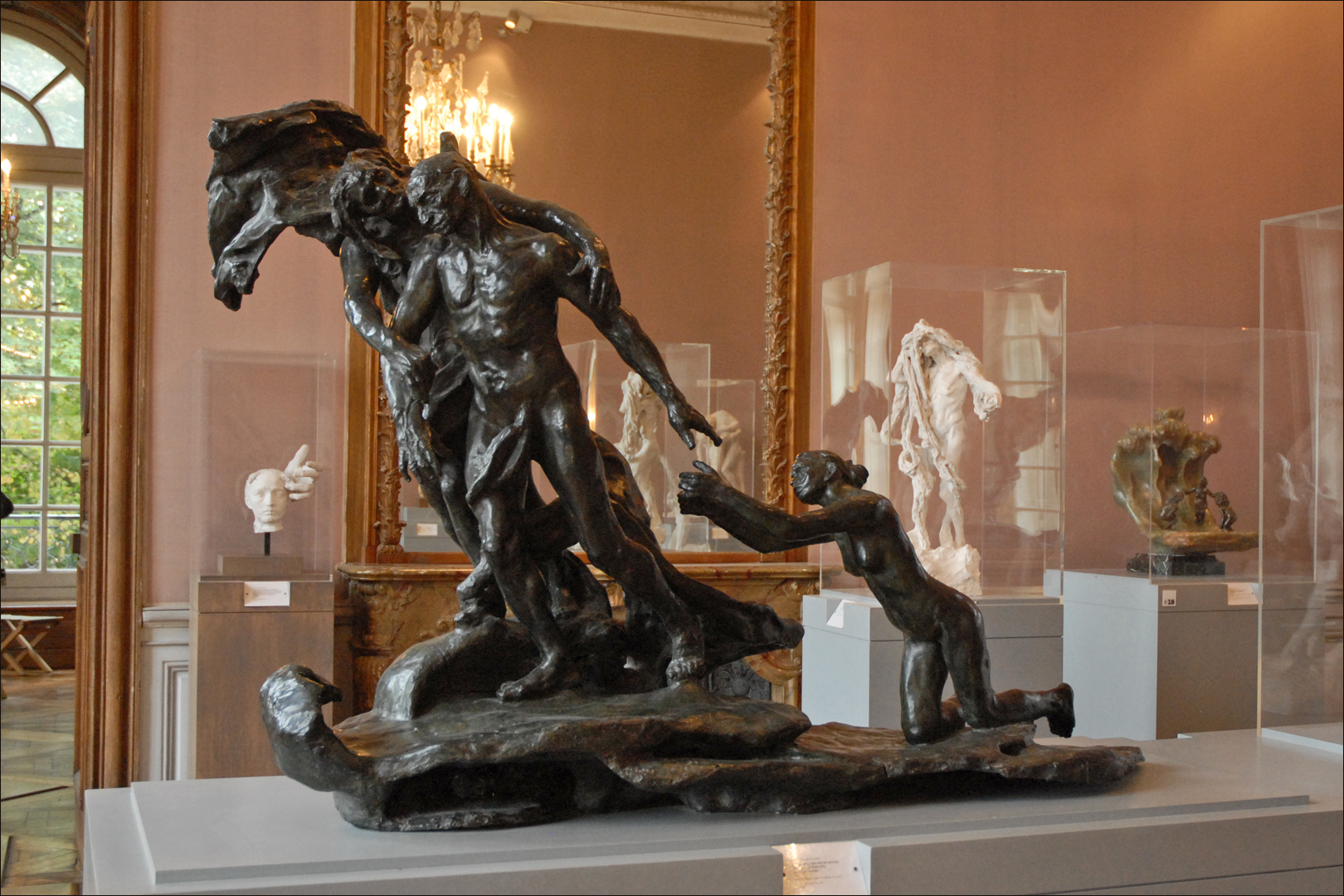
The Mature Age, 1913 bronze casting in the Claudel room at the Musée Rodin in Paris. (The figure standing behind, ensnared in her own hair, is Clotho, 1893)

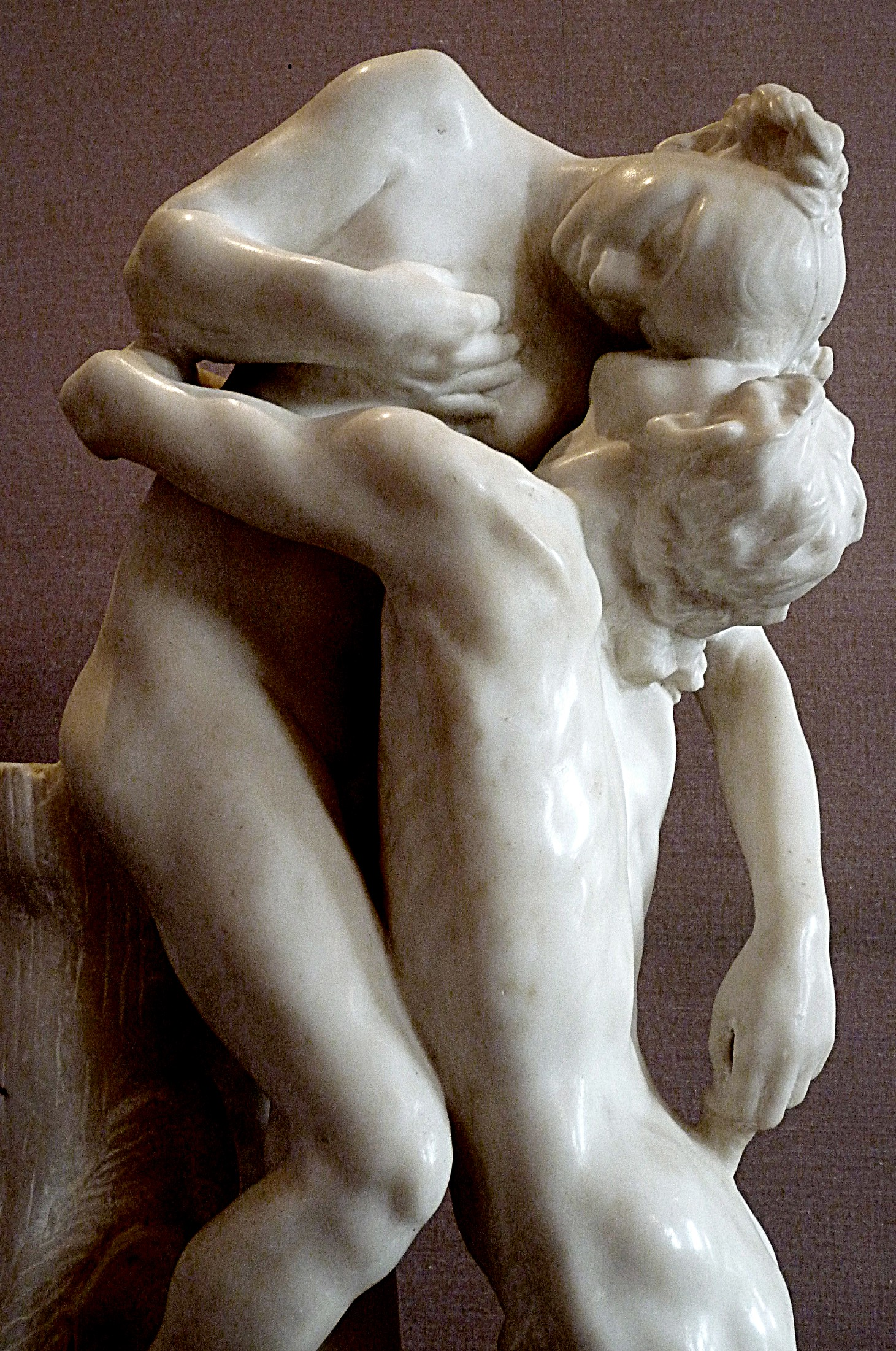
Claudel's Sakuntala, marble, 1888, (1905 copy shown, Musée Rodin, Paris)

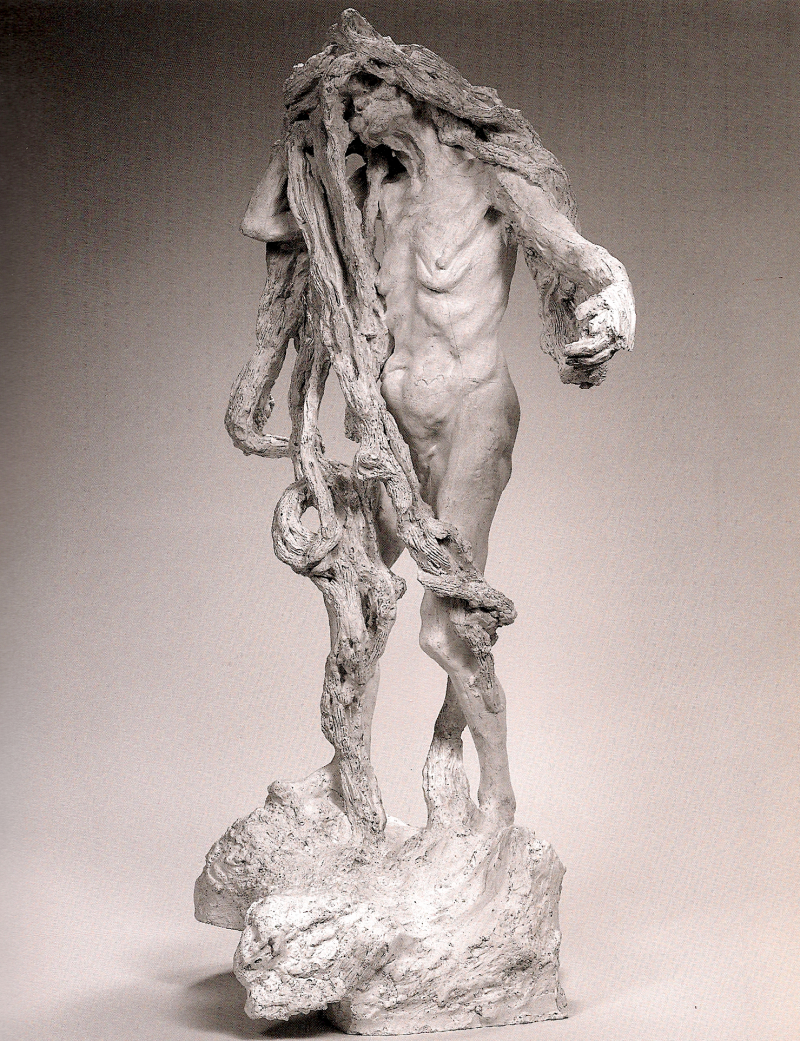
Clotho, 1893

After Rodin saw Claudel's The Mature Age for the first time, in 1899, he reacted with shock and anger. He suddenly and completely stopped his support for Claudel. According to Ayral-Clause, Rodin might have put pressure on the ministry of fine arts to cancel the funding for the bronze commission.

The Mature Age (1900) is usually interpreted as an allegory of the three stages of life: the man who represents Maturity is drawn into the hands of the old woman who represents Old Age and Death, while the young woman who represents Youth tries to save him. Claudel's brother interpreted it as an allegory of her break with Rodin. Angelo Caranfa comments that "The life that was, is, and will be in Maturity contains within its movement both the relentless movement of Clotho and the rhythmic, graceful, whirling movement of Fortune, generating a single and sustaining movement or image out of the differences within" . According to Caranfa, Clotho (1893) and Fortune (1905) represent the two ideas of life: life in Clotho is portrayed as closed, hopeless existence and "consummated in an unending death"; life in Fortune is celebrated as the madness of eternal present with ups and downs, its "rapture or total harmony" (Fortune itself is a variation of the dancing woman in The Waltz).

One of Claudel's figures, The Implorer, was produced as an edition of its own. It has been interpreted not as purely autobiographical but as an even more powerful representation of change and purpose in the human condition. Modelled for in 1898 and cast in 1905, Claudel didn't actually cast her own bronze for this work, but instead The Implorer was cast in Paris by Eugene Blot.

Claudel's masterful study of a young girl, La Petite Châtelaine, was completed in marble in 1895. Successive versions of La Petite Châtelaine demonstrate Claudel's talent for carving in marble, a skill Rodin himself did not have. La Petite Châtelaine stands alone in 19th-century sculpture as a portrayal of young girlhood; "there is no trace here of the pubescent figure with noticeable nipples or of the decorative, soft-cheeked cherub," Peterson observes.

In 1902 Claudel completed a large sculpture of Perseus and the Gorgon. Beginning in 1903, she exhibited her works at the Salon des Artistes français or at the Salon d'Automne.

Sakuntala, 1888, is described by Angelo Caranfa as expressing Claudel's desire to reach the sacred, the fruit of the lifelong search of her artistic identity, free from Rodin's constraints. Caranfa suggests that Claudel's impressions of Rodin's deceptions and exploitation of her, as someone who could not become obedient as he wanted her to be and who was expected to conform to society's expectation of what women should be, were not false. Thus Sakuntala could be called a clear expression of her solitary existence and her inner search, her journey within.

In The Chatterboxes, Claudel depicted subject matter that was exceedingly rare in European sculpture at that time: "platonic female intimacy, not as an excuse to display a breast or a hip for the onlooker, but as women actually experience it." The sculpture shows a group of three women listening to a story told by a fourth companion. Tellingly, in an 1893 letter to her brother Paul, Claudel emphasised that The Chatterboxes was "no longer anything like Rodin."

Ayral-Clause says that even though Rodin signed some of her works, he was not treating her as different because of her gender; artists at this time generally signed their apprentices' work. Others criticise Rodin for not giving her the acknowledgment or support she deserved. Walker argues that most historians believe Rodin did what he could to help her after their separation, and that her destruction of her own oeuvre was partly responsible for the long-time neglect the art world showed her. Walker also says that what truly defeated Claudel, who was already recognised by many as a leading sculptor, were the sheer difficulties of the medium and the market: sculpting was an expensive art, and she did not receive many official commissions because her style was highly unusual for the contemporary conservative tastes. Despite this, Le Cornec and Pollock believe she changed the history of arts.

Other authors write that it is still unclear how much Rodin influenced Claudel – and vice versa, how much credit has been taken away from her, or how much he was responsible for her woes. Most modern authors agree that she was a genius who, although starting with wealth, beauty, iron will and a brilliant future even before meeting Rodin, was never rewarded and died in loneliness, poverty, and obscurity.

Critics in the 21st century such as Elsen, Matthews and Flemming suggest it was her brother Paul who was jealous of her genius. They say that he conspired with her mother, who never forgave her for her supposed immorality, to deny her funds, ruin her, and keep her confined to a mental hospital. Kavaler-Adler notes that Claudel's younger sister Louise, who wanted Camille's share of the inheritance and was also jealous of her, was delighted at her sister's downfall.

Although less well known than her love affair with Rodin, the nature of her relationship with Claude Debussy has also been the object of much speculation. Stephen Barr reports that Debussy pursued her: it was unknown whether they ever became lovers. They both admired artists Degas and Hokusai, and shared an interest in childhood and death themes. When Claudel ended the relationship, Debussy wrote: "I weep for the disappearance of the Dream of this Dream." Debussy admired her as a great artist and kept a copy of The Waltz in his studio until his death. By the age of thirty, Claudel's romantic life had ended.

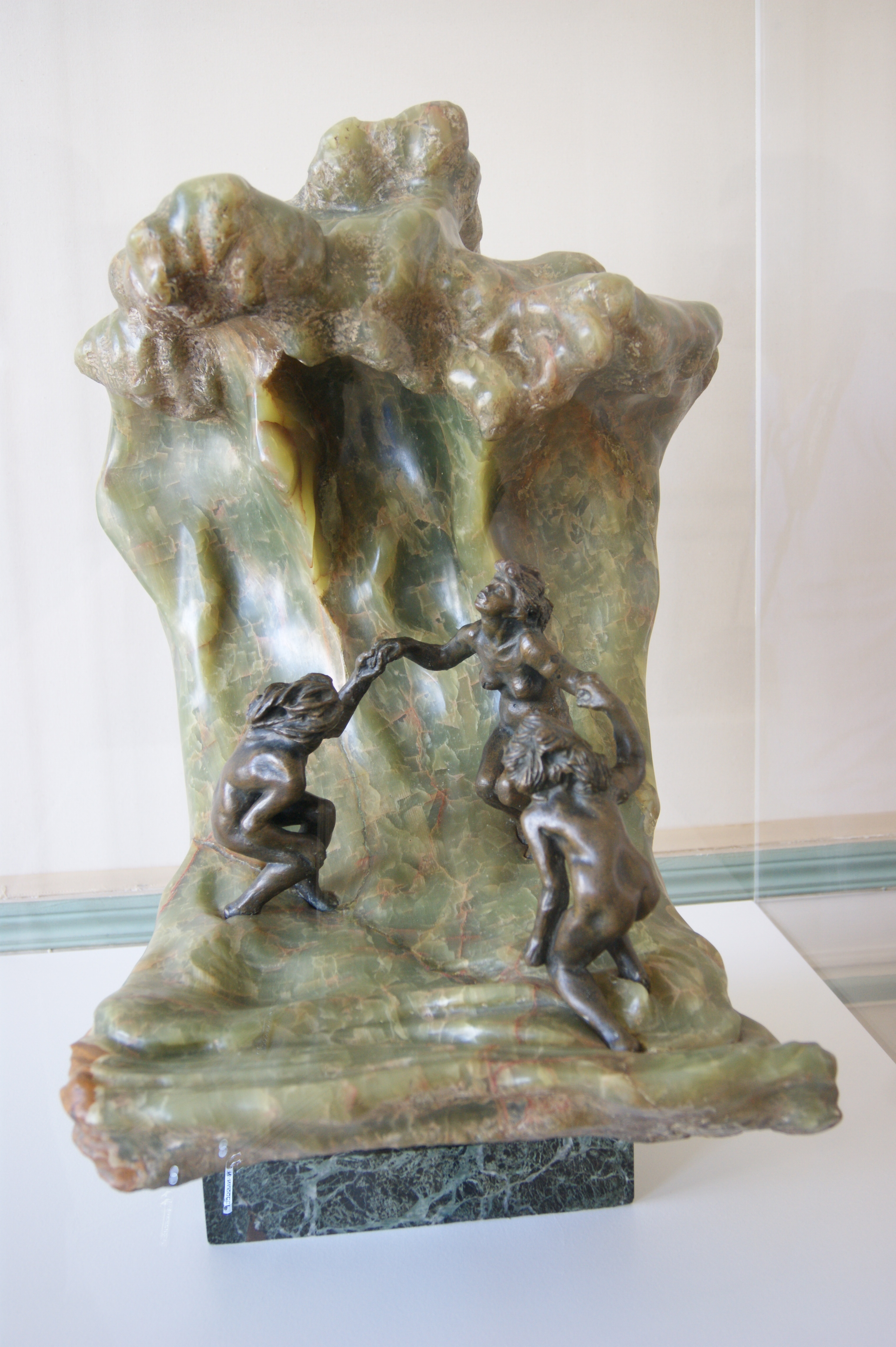
La Vague ("The Wave") (1897), exhibited in the Claudel room of the Musée Rodin

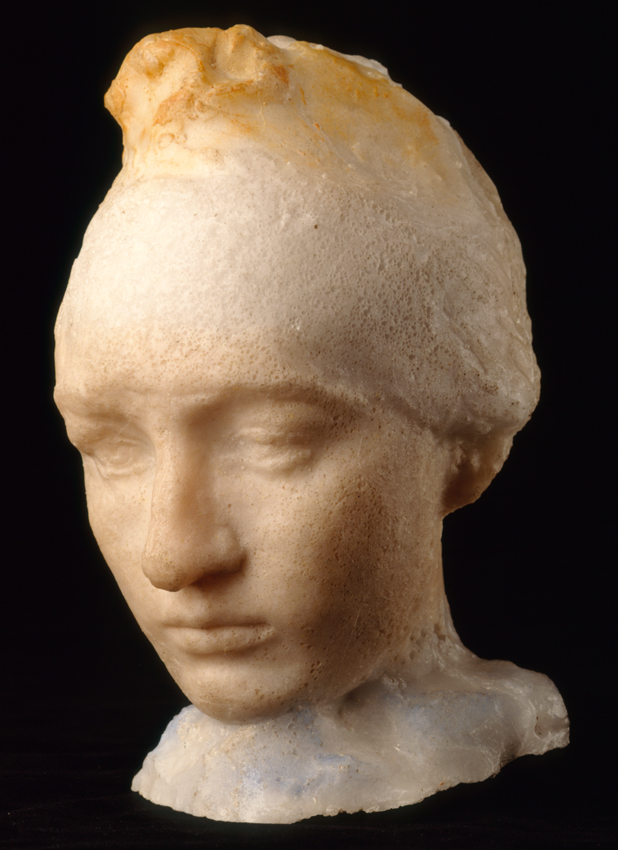
Head of Camille Claudel, 1884, by Auguste Rodin, portrays Claudel wearing a Phrygian cap, on exhibit at the Museo Soumaya

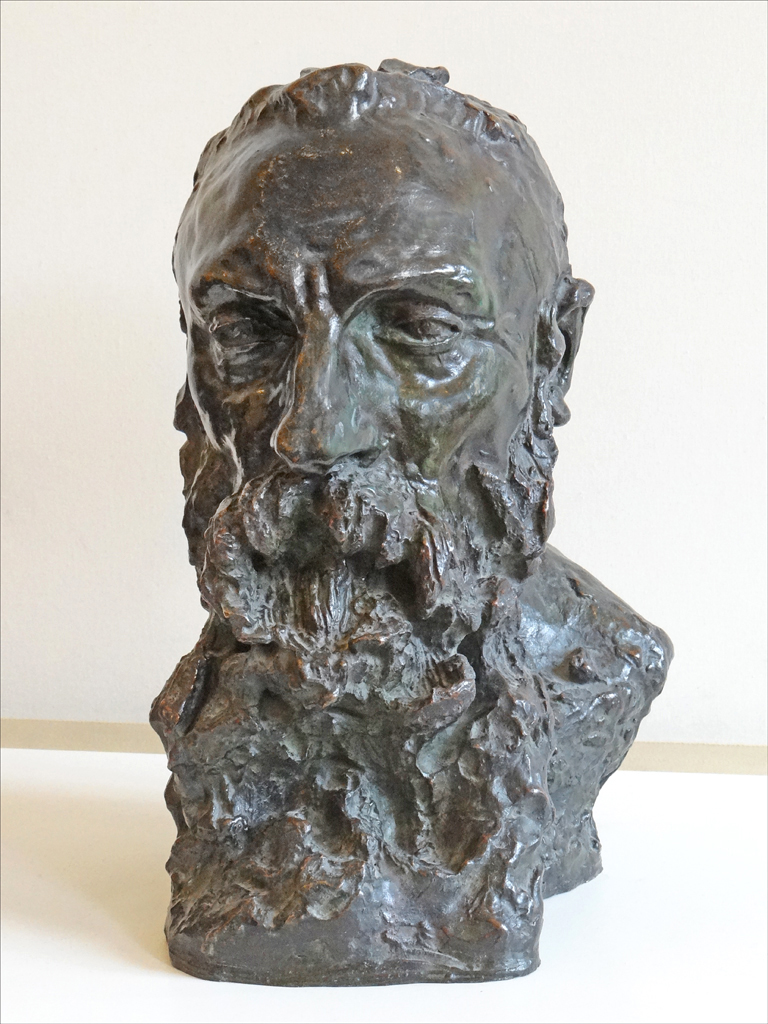
Claudel's Bust of Rodin (1888-89), in the Musée Rodin

== Alleged mental illness and confinement ==
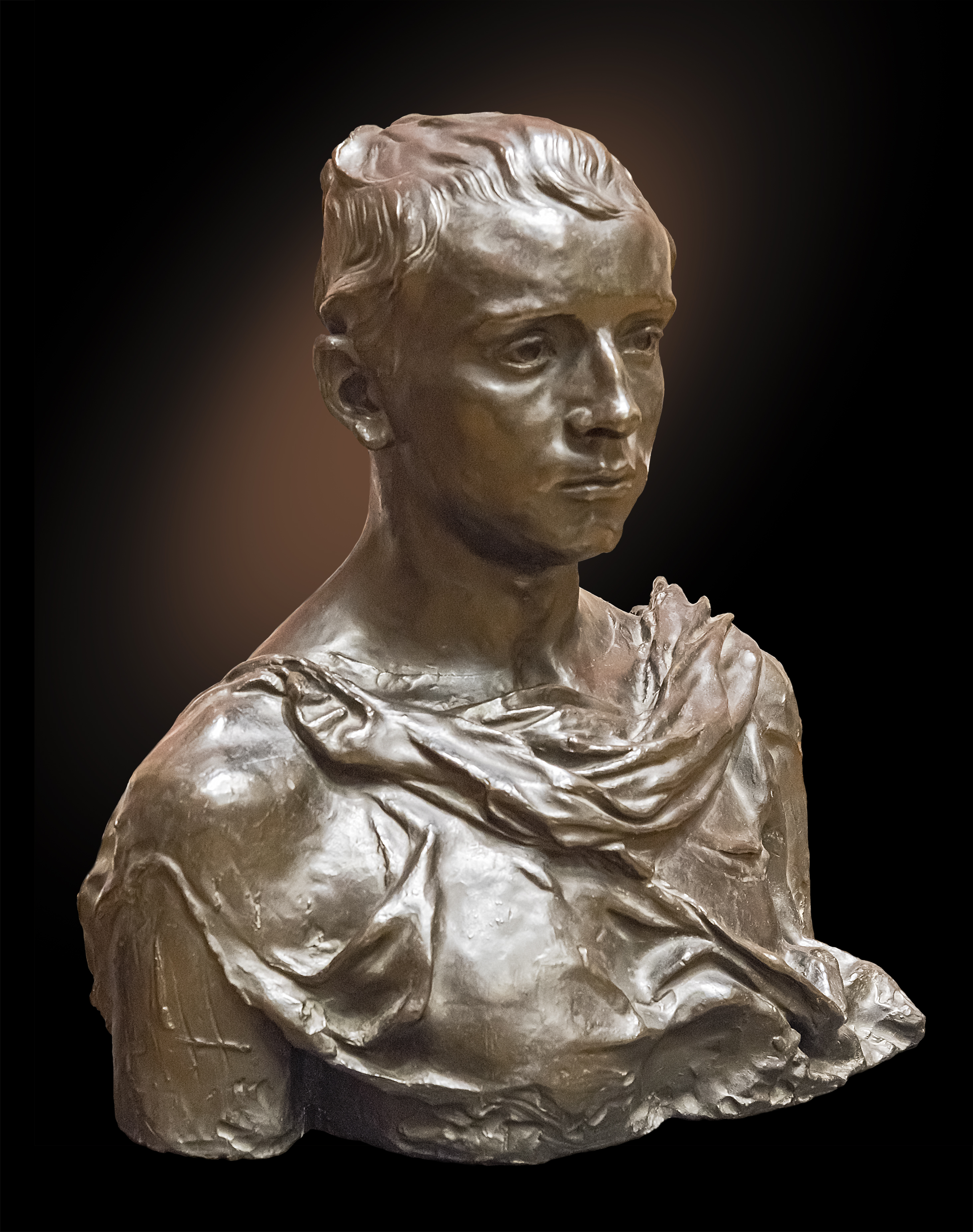
Paul Claudel aged sixteen by Camille Claudel, modeled in 1884 and cast in 1893, Musée des Augustins, Toulouse

After 1905, Claudel appeared to be mentally ill. She destroyed many of her statues, disappeared for long periods of time, exhibited signs of paranoia and was diagnosed as having schizophrenia. She accused Rodin of stealing her ideas and of leading a conspiracy to kill her. After the wedding of her brother in 1906 and his return to China, she lived secluded in her workshop. Claudel's father approved of her career choice, and he tried to help and support her financially. But when he died on 2 March 1913, Claudel was not informed of his death. Eight days later, on 10 March 1913, at the request of her younger brother Paul, she was admitted to the psychiatric hospital of Ville-Évrard in Neuilly-sur-Marne. The form read that she had been "voluntarily" committed, although her admission was signed only by a doctor and her brother. There are records to show that, while she did have mental outbursts, she was clear-headed while working on her art. Doctors tried to convince Paul and their mother that Claudel did not need to be in the institution, but they still kept her there. According to Cécile Bertran, a curator from the Musée Camille Claudel, the situation was not easy to judge, because modern experts who have looked at her records say she was indeed ill.

In 1914, to be safe from advancing German troops, the patients at Ville-Évrard were at first relocated to Enghien. On 7 September 1914, Claudel was transferred with a number of other women, to the Montdevergues Asylum, at Montfavet, six kilometres from Avignon. Her certificate of admittance to Montdevergues was signed on 22 September 1914; it reported that she suffered "from a systematic persecution delirium mostly based upon false interpretations and imagination".

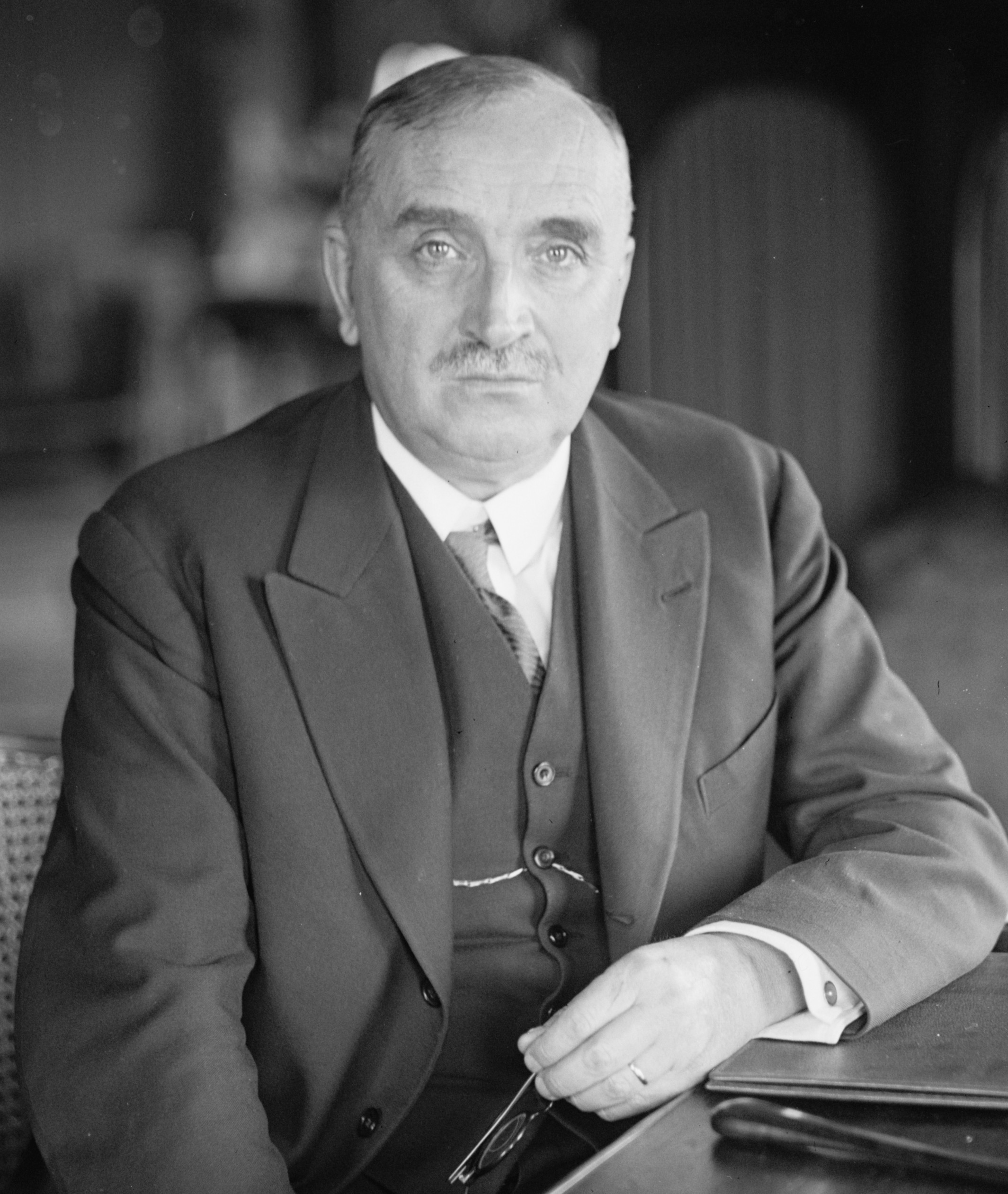
Paul Claudel in 1927

For a while, the press accused her family of committing a sculptor of genius. Her mother forbade her to receive mail from anyone other than her brother. The hospital staff regularly proposed to her family that Claudel be released, but her mother adamantly refused each time. On 1 June 1920, physician Dr. Brunet sent a letter advising her mother to try to reintegrate her daughter into the family environment. Nothing came of this. Paul Claudel visited his confined older sister seven times in 30 years, in 1913, 1920, 1925, 1927, 1933, 1936, and 1943. He always referred to her in the past tense. Their sister Louise visited her just one time in 1929. Her mother, who died in June 1929, never visited Claudel.

In 1929, sculptor and Claudel's former friend Jessie Lipscomb visited her, and afterwards insisted "it was not true" that Claudel was insane. Rodin's friend, Mathias Morhardt, insisted that Paul was a "simpleton" who had "shut away" his genius of a sister.

Camille Claudel died on 19 October 1943, after having lived 30 years in the asylum at Montfavet (known then as the Asile de Montdevergues, now the modern psychiatric hospital Centre hospitalier de Montfavet). Her brother Paul had been informed of his sister's terminal illness in September and, with some difficulty, had crossed Occupied France to see her, although he was not present at her death or funeral. Her sister did not make the journey to Montfavet. Claudel was interred in the cemetery of Montfavet, and eventually her remains were buried in a communal grave at the asylum.

From the 2002 book, Camille Claudel, A Life:

"Ten years after her death, Camille's bones had been transferred to a communal grave, where they were mixed with the bones of the most destitute. Joined forever to the ground she tried to escape for so long, Camille never, ever, returned to her beloved Villeneuve. Paul's neglect regarding his sister's grave is hard to forgive...while Paul decided not to be burdened with his sister's grave, he took great pains, on the contrary, in choosing his own final resting place, naming the exact location – in Brangues, under a tree, next to his grandchild – and citing the precise words to be written on the stone. Today his admirers pay homage to his memory at his noble grave; but of Camille there is not a trace. In Villeneuve, a simple plaque reminds the curious visitor that Camille Claudel once lived there, but her remains are still in exile, somewhere, just a few steps away from the place where she was sequestered for thirty years."

== Legacy ==
=== Musée Camille Claudel ===
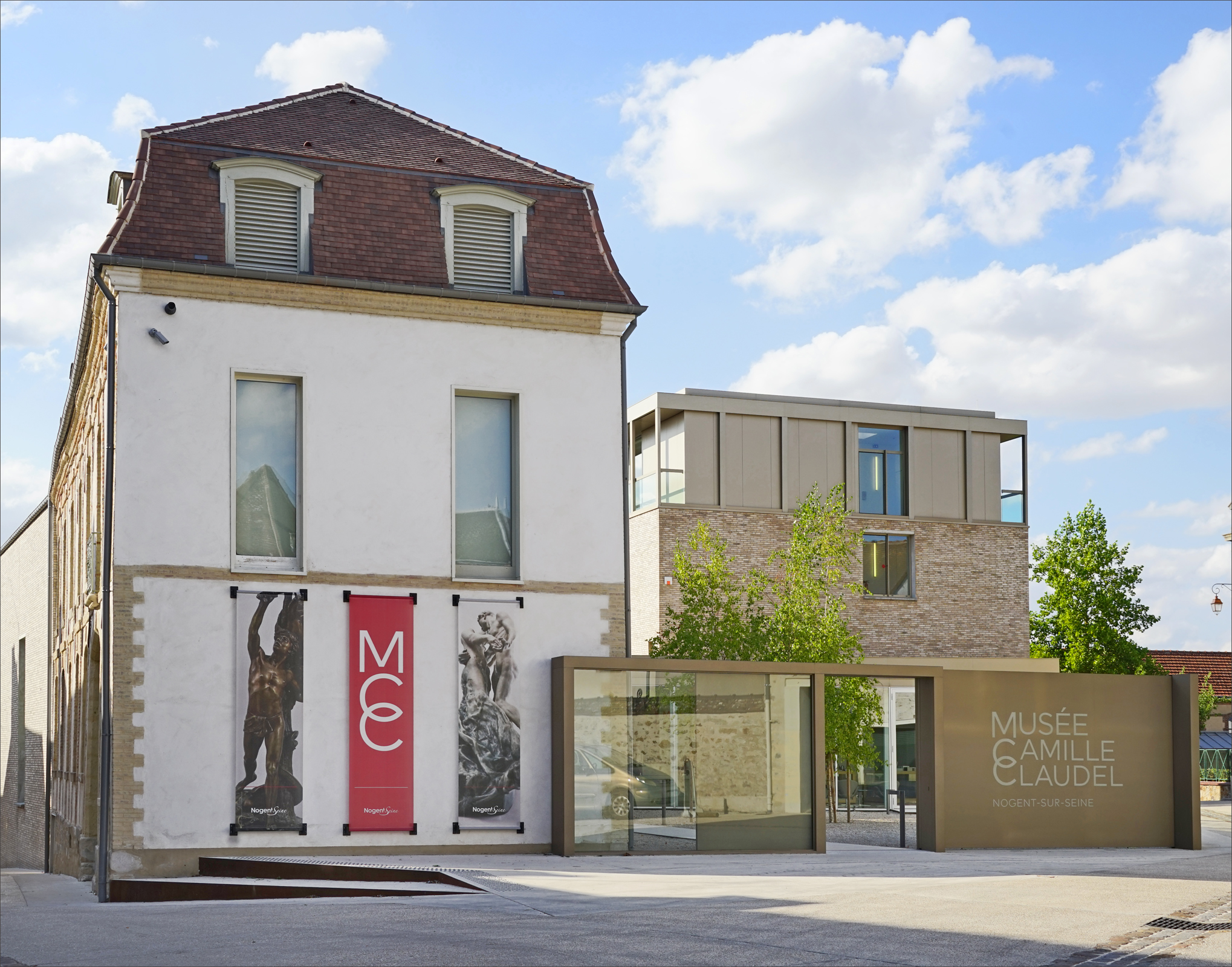
The Musée Camille Claudel

Plans to turn the Claudel family home at Nogent-sur-Seine into a national museum dedicated to Claudel's work were announced in 2003, and the museum negotiated with the Claudel family to buy Camille's works. These include 70 pieces, including a bust of Rodin.

The Musée Camille Claudel opened in March, 2017. The museum displays approximately half of Claudel's 90 surviving works.

=== Surviving works ===
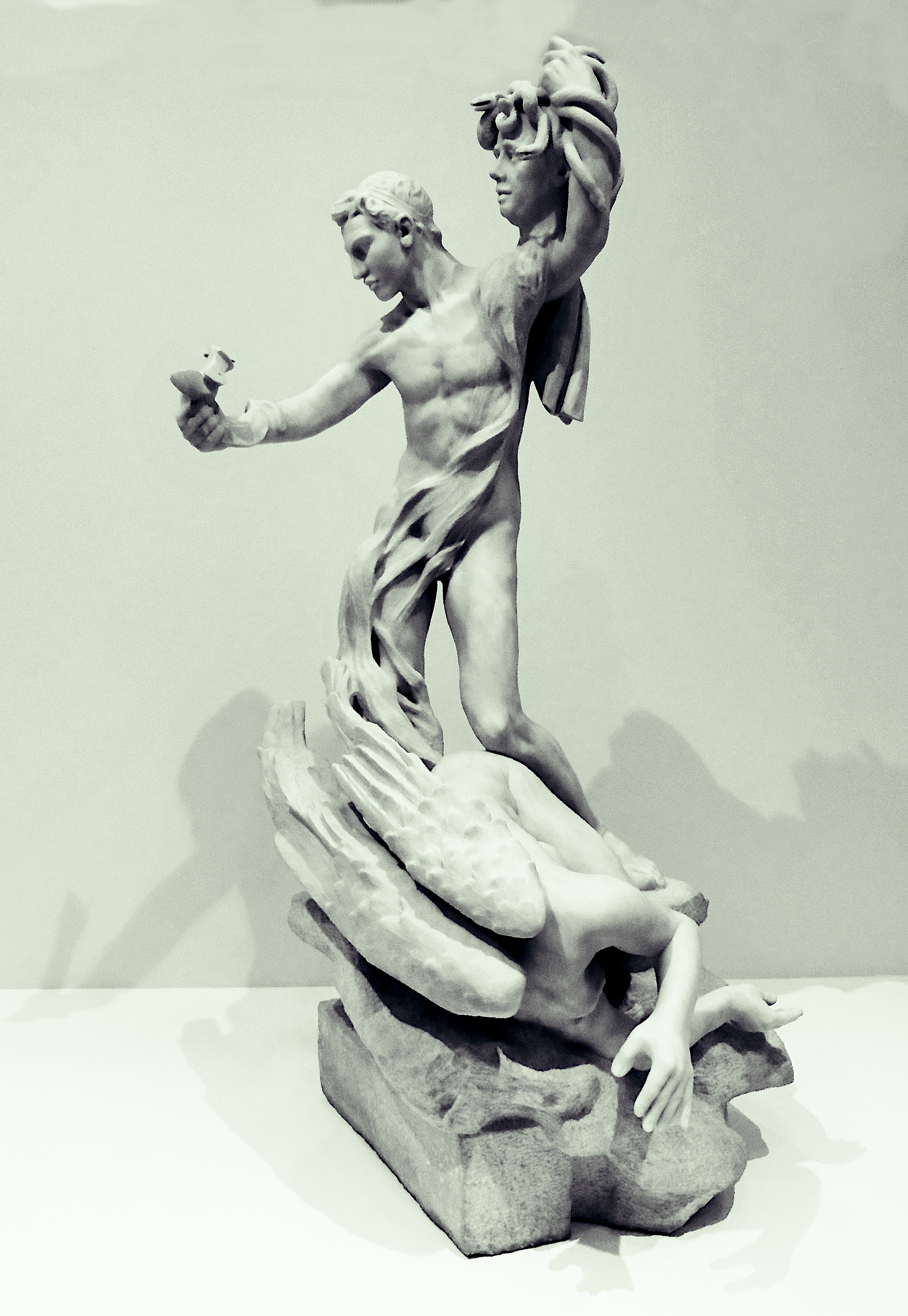
Claudel's Perseus and the Gorgon (1905)

Though she destroyed much of her work, about 90 statues, sketches and drawings survive. She was at first censored as she portrayed sexuality in her work. Her response was a symbolic, intellectual style as opposed to the "expressive" approach normally attributed to women artists. Claudel's sculptures are noted for their candid exploration of female subjectivity and emotional depth, and they played a formative role in shaping expressive modernist figuration in Europe, influencing later women sculptors including Germaine Richier and Louise Bourgeois. In 1951, Paul Claudel organised an exhibition at the Musée Rodin, which continues to display her sculptures.

A major retrospective exhibition of Camille Claudel's work was held in 1984 at the Musée Rodin in Paris (February 15–June 11) and later at the Musée Sainte-Croix in Poitiers (June 26–September 15).

From April 25 to May 31, 1988, the National Museum of Women in the Arts exhibited Camille Claudel: 1864-1943, the first exhibition of her work in the United States. The exhibit included 80 of her works, as well as works by Auguste Rodin.

In 2005 a large art display featuring the works of Rodin and Claudel was exhibited in Quebec City (Canada), and Detroit, Michigan, in the US. In 2008, the Musée Rodin organised a retrospective exhibition including more than 80 of her works.

In 2005, Sotheby's sold a second edition La Valse (1905, Blot, number 21) for $932,500. In a 2009 Paris auction, Claudel's Le Dieu Envolé (1894/1998, foundry Valsuani, signed and numbered 6/8) had a high estimate of $180,000, while a comparable Rodin sculpture, L'éternelle Idole (1889/1930, Rudier, signed) had a high estimate of $75,000.

In 2023, The Art Institute of Chicago and the J. Paul Getty Museum co-organized a major retrospective of her work, featuring 60 sculptures from more than 30 institutional and private lenders. The show gathered many of her key compositions in terracotta, plaster, bronze, and stone.

=== Stage ===
Some authors argue that Henrik Ibsen based his last play, 1899's When We Dead Awaken, on Rodin's relationship with Claudel.

The Seattle playwright S.P. Miskowski's La Valse (2000) is a well-researched look at Claudel's life.

In 2012, the world premiere of the play Camille Claudel took place. Written, performed and directed by Gaël Le Cornec, premiered at the Pleasance Courtyard Edinburgh Festival, the play looks at the relationship of master and muse from the perspective of Camille at different stages in her life.

The composer Frank Wildhorn and lyricist Nan Knighton's musical Camille Claudel was produced by Goodspeed Musicals at The Norma Terris Theatre in Chester, Connecticut in 2003.

=== Film ===
The 1988 film Camille Claudel was a dramatisation of her life based largely on historical records. Directed by Bruno Nuytten, co-produced by Isabelle Adjani, starring Adjani as Claudel and Gérard Depardieu as Rodin, the film was nominated for two Academy Awards in 1989. Another film, Camille Claudel 1915, directed by Bruno Dumont and starring Juliette Binoche as Claudel, premiered at the 63rd Berlin International Film Festival in 2013. The 2017 film Rodin co-stars Izïa Higelin as Claudel.

=== Music ===
The composer Jeremy Beck's Death of a Little Girl with Doves (1998), an operatic soliloquy for soprano and orchestra, is based on the life and letters of Camille Claudel. This composition has been recorded by Rayanne Dupuis, soprano, with the Slovak Radio Symphony Orchestra. Beck's composition has been described as "a deeply attractive and touching piece of writing ... [demonstrating] imperious melodic confidence, fluent emotional command and yielding tenderness."

US indie rock band The Poison Control Center's ninth song on the album Collage of Impressions (2007), is a biographical homage to Camille Claudel.

=== Dance ===
In 2014, the Columbus Dance Theatre and the Carpe Diem String Quartet performed the premiere of Claudel in Columbus, Ohio, with music by Korine Fujiwara, original poetry by Kathleen Kirk, and choreography by Tim Veach.

In 2021, Australian choreographer Meryl Tankard choreographed Claudel for the Sydney Opera House, presented by Tinderbox Productions. The ballet was written and directed by playwright Wendy Beckett, and is based on the life of Claudel and her relationship with Rodin.

=== Literature ===
In 1982, the publication of the fictionalised biography Une femme, by author Anne Delbée, sparked a resurgence of interest in her work. A 2015 novel by Carol Bruneau, These Good Hands, imagines the end of Claudel's life in 1943, through the relationship with her caregiving nurse.

Claudel is the subject of the graphic novel Troppo Libera. L'arte, l'amore, la lotta di Camille Claudel (The Art, Love, and Struggle of Camille Claudel) by Assia Petricelli and Sergio Riccardi, published in February 2026.

== See also ==
- List of sculptures by Camille Claudel
- Rodin, 2017 film, with Izïa Higelin portraying Claudel.

== Bibliography ==
- Ayral-Clause, Odile (2002). Camille Claudel : a life. New York: Harry N. Abrams, Publishers. ISBN 9780810940772. OCLC 47756244.
- Caranfa, Angelo (1999). Camille Claudel : a sculpture of interior solitude. Lewisburg London: Bucknell University Press Associated University Presses. ISBN 9780838753910. OCLC 39380244.
- Elsen, Albert E.; Jamison, Rosalyn Frankel (13 March 2003). Rodin's Art: The Rodin Collection of Iris & B. Gerald Cantor Center of Visual Arts at Stanford University. Oxford University Press. ISBN 978-0-19-803061-4.
- Lenormand-Romain, Antoinette et al. Camille Claudel and Rodin: Fateful Encounter. New York: Gingko Press, 2005.
- Mitchell, Claudine. "Intellectuality and Sexuality: Camille Claudel, The Fin de Siecle Sculptress," Art History 12#4 (1989): 419–447.
- Rivière, Anne & Bruno Gaudichon. Camille Claudel: Catalogue raisonné. Paris: Adam Biro, 2001.
- Vollmer, Ulrike (2007). Seeing film and reading feminist theology : a dialogue. New York: Palgrave Macmillan. ISBN 9782864324065. OCLC 247474486.
