= Jessie Lipscomb =

English sculptor of the human figure

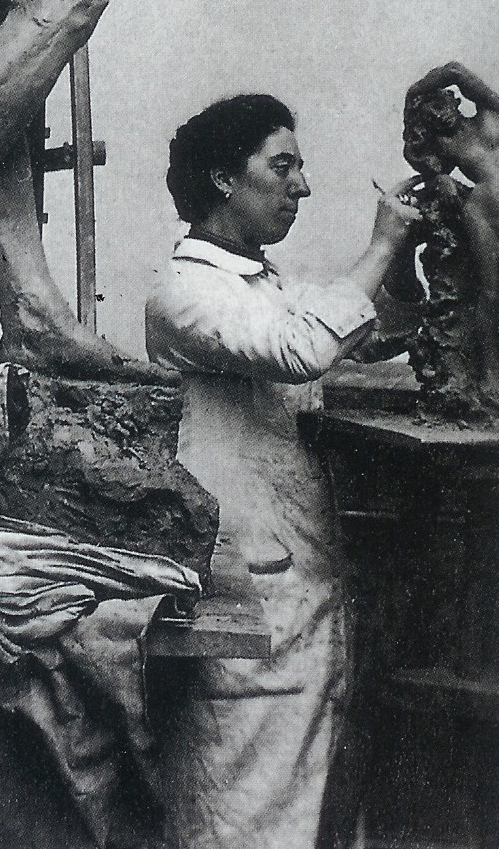
- Lipscomb in 1887
- Born: 13 June 1861; Grantham, Lincolnshire, England
- Died: 12 January 1952 (aged 90)
- Education: Royal College of Art
- Occupation: sculptor
- Years active: 1882-1887
- Known for: figurative sculpture
- Awards: Queen's Prize, 1882; National Silver Medal, 1883

Jessie Lipscomb, later Jessie Elborne, (13 June 1861 – 12 January 1952) was an English sculptor of the human figure. She worked in Paris in a shared studio workshop in the late 1800s with French sculptor Camille Claudel and two fellow alumni from the Royal College of Art: Amy Singer and Emily Fawcett.

== Early life and education ==
Jessie Lipscomb was born in Grantham, Lincolnshire, England in 1861, the only child of Sidney Lipscomb, a colliery agent, and Harriet Arnold, a barmaid. In 1875, the family moved to Peterborough. Lipscomb attended the Royal College of Art, which at that time was called the National Art Training School in South Kensington. She won two prizes from the school: the Queen's Prize in 1882 and a national silver medal in 1883.

Lipscomb visited Paris with a view to continuing her education. Her instructors, Alphonse Legros and Édouard Lantéri, encouraged Lipscomb to further her studies in Paris where the schooling was more equitable for female students. Two previous graduates of the National Art Training School - Amy Singer and Emily Fawcett - were already living in Paris, and sharing a studio with the young French sculptor Camille Claudel. In January 1884, Claudel's mother Louise wrote to Lipscomb and confirmed the arrangement that she was welcome to lodge with the Claudel family for 200 francs a month.

The four women sharing the studio were also tutored by sculptor Afred Boucher for a few years before he moved to Florence. He asked his friend Auguste Rodin, another sculptor, to assist his pupils. In 1885, Lipscomb and Claudel were the first women to join Auguste Rodin's all-male atelier to sculpt portions of a major commissioned work: The Burghers of Calais. Lipscomb was a gifted modeler, excelling in sculpting drapery.

Lipscomb and Claudel spent the summer of 1886, from May through September, in Peterborough with Jessie's family. At this time Jessie was exhibiting a terra-cotta bust Day Dreams (1886) in the Royal Academy, and in Nottingham. Letters from Rodin, addressed to Lipscomb, indicate that Rodin was pursuing Claudel during this time, despite the fact that he had a common- law wife. After the summer in England, both women returned to Paris and continued to work with Rodin for a time before their paths diverged.

The friendship between Lipscomb and Claudel deteriorated, and the latter claimed she never wanted to see Lipscomb again. However, Lipscomb visited Claudel in 1929, when the latter was confined in the Montdevergues Asylum. The photograph taken during this visit by Lipscomb's husband is considered to be one of the last known images of Claudel.

== Sculpture ==
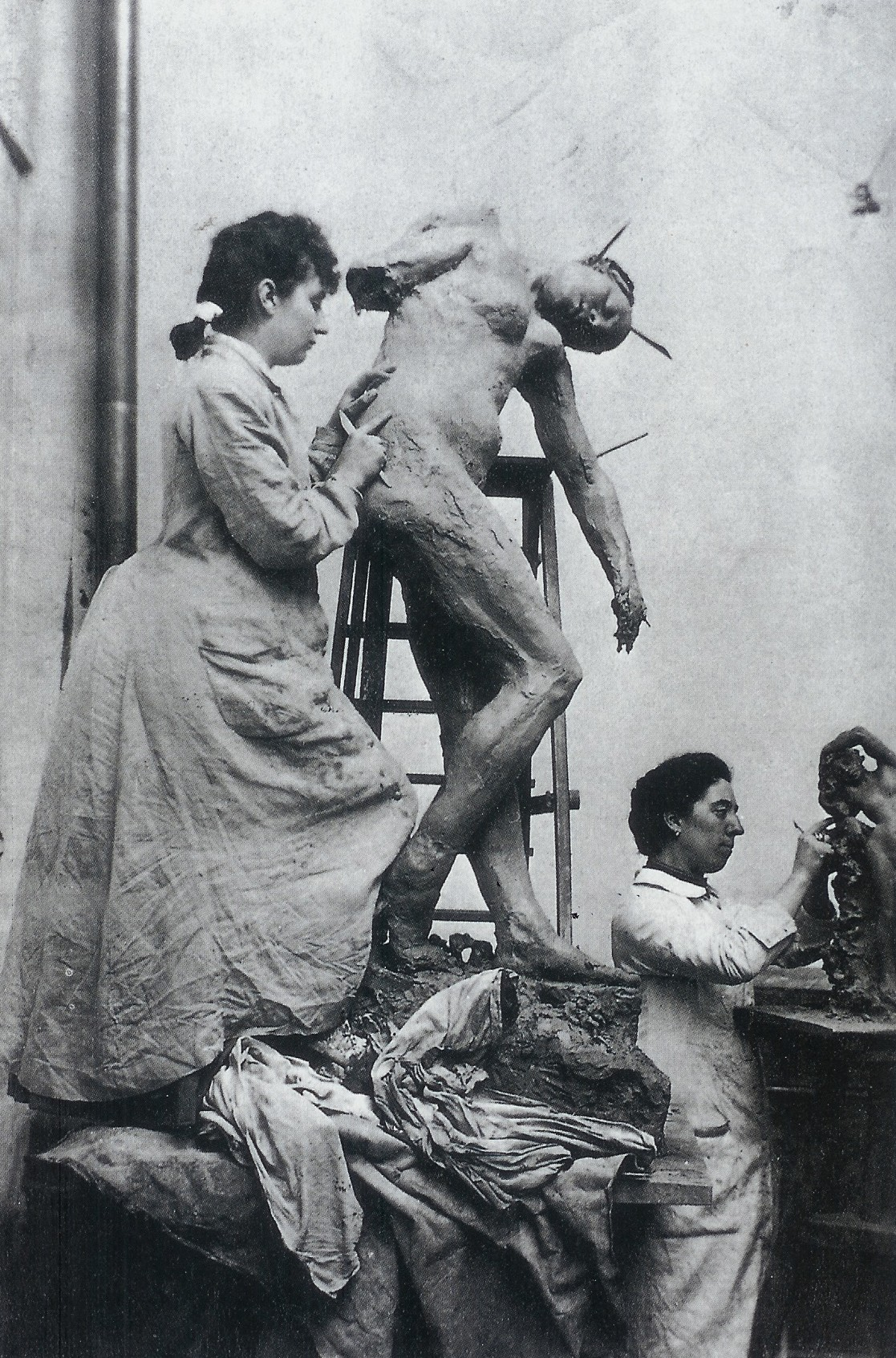
Jessie Lipscomb (right) and Camille Claudel modeling sculptures in Paris, 1887

From 1885 - 1887 Lipscomb exhibited her artwork annually in exhibitions at both the Royal Academy of Arts and Nottingham Castle Museum. She exhibited a terra-cotta piece entitled Sans Souci, a plaster portrait of Camille Claudel, and a bust of the Italian model Giganti in 1887.

== Personal life ==
Lipscomb married William Elborne on 26 December 1887 and they settled in Manchester. The couple had four children together. After their long marriage, they died within eight days of each other in 1952.

== In popular culture ==
Maggie Ritchie's 2015 novel Paris Kiss focuses on the relationship between Jessie Lipscomb and Camille Claudel, and offers a highly fictionalized version of Claudel and Rodin's affair.
