= Laure Coutan-Montorgueil =

French sculptor (1855–1915)

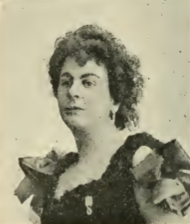
- Born: 1855; Dun-sur-Auron, France
- Died: 1915 (aged 59–60)
- Known for: Sculpture
- Spouse: Octave Lebesgue

Laure Coutan-Montorgueil (1855–1915), also known as Laure Coutan, was a French sculptor.

== Biography ==
Laure Coutan-Montorgueil née Martin was born in 1855 in Dun-sur-Auron. She studied with Alfred Boucher. Coutan-Montorgueil exhibited her work in the Woman's Building at the 1893 World's Columbian Exposition in Chicago, Illinois. On September 25 1896, she married Octave Lebesgue. She died in 1915 in the 9th arrondissement of Paris.

== Gallery ==
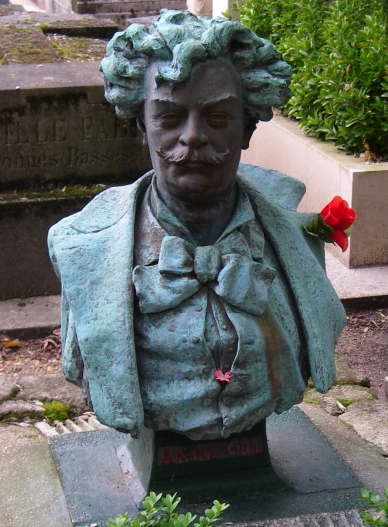
grave stone bust of Andre Gill

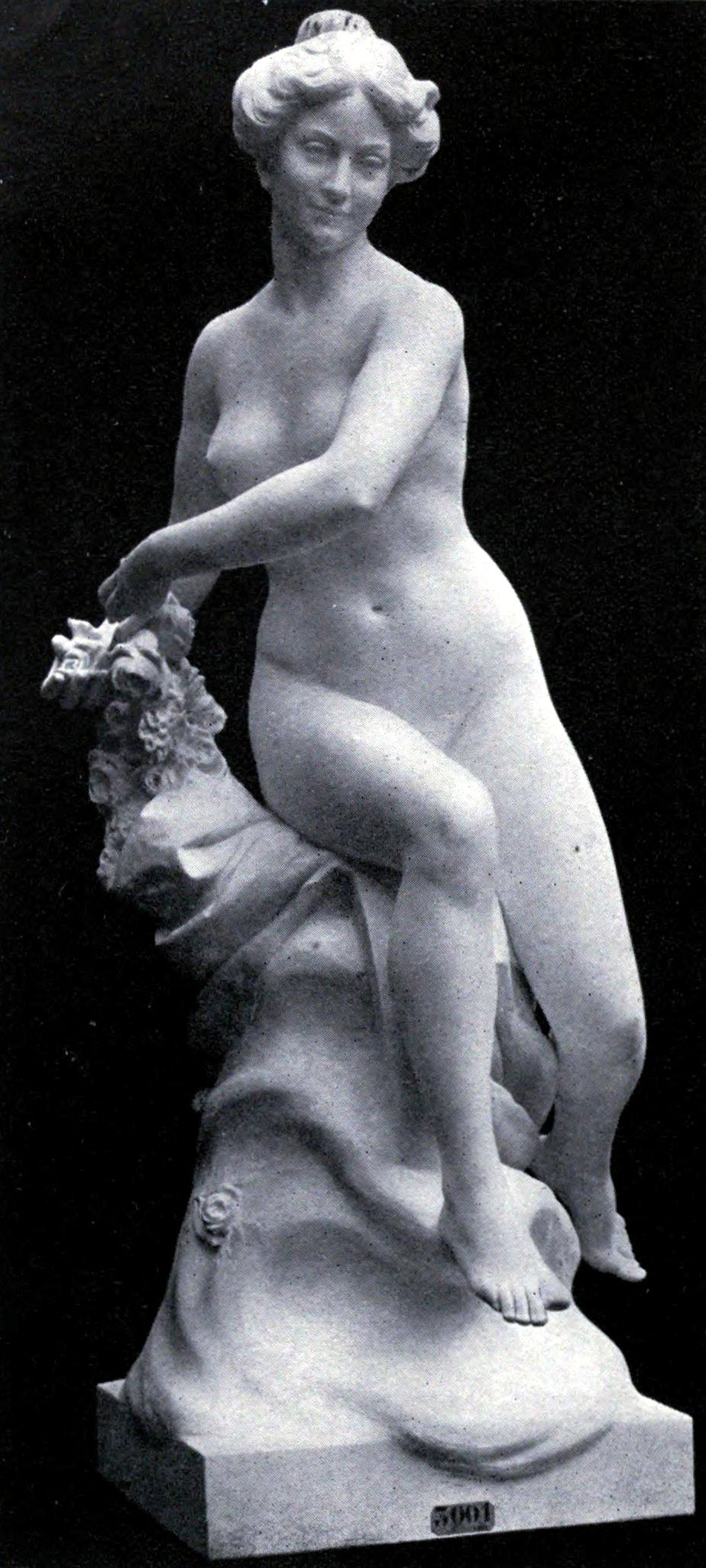
La Fortune
