= The Soufflet Group =

French agro-industrial company

Groupe Soufflet
- Type: Société anonyme (a joint stock company under French law)
- Industry: activities of head offices
- Founded: 1900; 126 years ago
- Headquarters: Nogent-sur-Seine, France
- Key people: Michel Soufflet, Jean-Michel Soufflet, Laurence Soufflet
- Revenue: €4,61 Billion (2021)
- Number of employees: 2,521 (in France) 7,041 (in 19 countries)
- Website: www.soufflet.com

The Soufflet Group is a French agro-industrial company specialising in agricultural raw material. The group was family-owned from 1900 until its acquisition by Invivo Group in 2021.

The Group primarily operated in the wheat and barley sectors in France, Europe, and Asia. It supported arable farmers with grain collection and cereal processing; advised on malting, cereal production and export, and assisted vine growers and winemakers.

== The OSIRIS Programme ==
In 2008, the Group participated in the OSIRIS programme, which focused on researching improvements in agricultural resources, animal nutrition, and generating biofuels. The OSIRIS program also involved the Laboratory of Biochemistry at ESPCI-ParisTech and Maguin S.A.S., a French company in the ethanolproduction industry. Over eight years, OSIRIS used a budget of €77 million, partly funded by Oséo, alongside four regional biotechnology research programmes: PRBR (Programmes de Recherche Biotechnologique Régionaux), the Champagne-Ardenne region, the department of Aube, and the town of Nogent-sur-Seine.

== Fields of business ==
The Soufflet Group had nine businesses:

=== Agriculture ===
France's top private collector of cereals and oil seeds, Soufflet Agriculture stores and markets farm production, and retails agricultural supplies in France and five other European countries.

=== Vine ===
Soufflet Vigne offers vine growers, winemakers, cooperatives and merchants a range of products and services, together with technical advice.

=== Trading ===
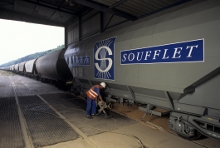
Trading wagon Soufflet

The Group's Trading Division, Soufflet Négoce, has 4 trading offices and 4 port silos (in the Atlantic, the Channel and the Black Sea). It specialises in sourcing, transporting and exporting cereals, oilseeds and dairy products.

=== Milling ===
With 10 mills in France and Belgium, Moulins Soufflet prepares and markets flours for its different types of customers: traditional bakers, flour-using industries and major retailers. Moulins Soufflet also owns the Baguépi brand name.

=== Ingredients ===
Formulating tailor-made ingredients, AIT Ingredients offers solutions meeting the various problems its industrial customers face, mainly in the breadmaking sector. The company is developing in the European and African markets as well as in Russia, the Middle East and South America.

=== Malting ===
Soufflet Malt, previously known as Malteries Soufflet, is one of the world's main producers of kilned and roasted malt and caramels and was formed by merging with United Malt Group in 2023. In July 2023, the group's malting arm, Malteries Soufflet, agreed to acquire the Australian company United Malt Group for about A$1.5 billion (US$1 billion), at A$5.00 per share; the acquisition was completed in November 2023, making the enlarged business the world's largest maltster.As of March 12, 2025, Soufflet Malt was identified as the world's largest maltster with 41 malting plants across 20 countries in Europe, Asia, Africa, Australia and America, and more than 2,300 employees.

=== Maize processing ===
Specializing in the first conversion of maize, Costimex produces and markets worldwide maize hominies, grits, semolina and flour tailored to the various requirements of brewers and snack and breakfast cereal manufacturers.

=== Rice and pulses ===
An industrial company specialising in processing and packing rice and pulses, Soufflet Alimentaire, which has three plants in France, including one in partnership – offers more than 120 materials and 2,000 product lines for the industrial, ethnic, catering and retail markets.

Soufflet Alimentaire (the food division) develops as well as markets products that can be microwaved by end-users under its Vivien Paille brand name.

=== Biotechnology ===
In Solid State Fermentation (SSF), the Soufflet Group works in the field of biotechnologies applied to innovative biocatalysts from agricultural resources.

Its Caen-based Lyven subsidiary formulates and produces SSF enzyme solutions for the fruit processing, drinks, bakery, animal feed and biofuel sectors.

== History ==
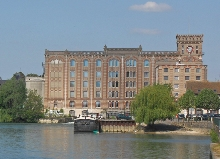
historic mill Soufflet

- 1900 - Pierre and Lucie Juchat founded a grain business at Nogent-sur-Seine in France's Champagne region.
- 1927 - Lucie Juchat passed the small business on to her son-in-law Jean Soufflet and daughter Yvonne who developed a cereal collection.
- 1939 - Jean Soufflet built the first grain silo on Quai Sarrail at Nogent-sur-Seine, where the Group is still based.
- 1946 - the family business became a limited liability company under the name Etablissements J. Soufflet.
- 1947 - farming modernised with the Marshall Plan and the construction of Europe took shape.
- 1950 - Jean Soufflet began the first cereal exports and bought the big Nogent-sur-Seine malt plant in 1953.
- 1957 - After his father died, Michel Soufflet ran the business.
- 1958 - The business became a joint stock company of 500,000 francs capital and was employing some twenty people.
- 1960 - Michel Soufflet improved cereal collection by creating a service to uplift and transport grain from the field to the silo.
- 1965 - Ets. J. Soufflet had thirty-four employees, including one at the Pont-sur-Seine silo and one at Anglure.
- 1966 - The first port silo was built at Rouen.
- 1970 - The Group built a new malt plant at Nogent-sur-Seine (30,000-tonne capacity) and opened its first foreign subsidiary in 1974, in Great Britain.
- 1978 - The Group, which had become the top private collector of cereals in France, went into milling by buying the first mill in France's Aube.
- 1981 - Jean-Michel Soufflet began his career in the Group.
- 1982 - Other sectors added such as plant baking, maize processing
- 1989 - Rice and pulses added.
- 1989 - The Group consolidated its milling business, taking over Cérès, the biggest miller in Belgium.
- 1994 - Soufflet bought the Pantin Group, consisting of Grands Moulins of Pantin and Corbeil, the Franco-Belgian malt plants and the cereal trader Cerapro.
- 1998 - The Group expanded abroad, investing in particular in Central and Eastern European countries.
- 2001 (Jan) - Jean-Michel Soufflet was appointed chairman of the executive board; Michel Soufflet became chairman of the supervisory board.
- 2002 (Apr) - The malting division expanded with the purchase of Tchécomalt and new companies set up in the Community of Independent States - Russia, Kazakhstan and Ukraine (2004)
- 2003 - The Ingredients Division was created, following the purchase of Lyven.
- 2005 - Moulins Soufflet bought the Dadou and Thor mills, then the Strasbourg mill in 2009, and the Ozon mill in 2010.
- 2008 - Marked by the official launch of the Osiris biotechnology innovation programme.
- 2010 - Malting Division inaugurated two new plants, in Romania and at Nogent-sur-Seine.
- 2011 (1 Jul) - Soufflet Agriculture took over Etablissements Maison Daughter (Indre) and AGIR (Yonne).
- 2011 - Soufflet Malting took over two malt plants from Kamenitza, a subsidiary of the Starbev Group (Bulgaria), then the German maltster Durst Malz.

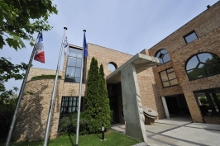
Soufflet Headquarters

== Acquisition by InVivo Group ==
In December 2021, The Soufflet Group was acquired by the InVivo Group. To help finance the acquisition, InVivo planned to sell a minority stake in Soufflet's malt division to KKR (KKR.N), Credit Agricole (CAGR.PA), and Bpifrance for 440 million euros.

InVivo completed the acquisition in December 2021 for about €2.2 billion (US$2.5 billion), in a deal that it said was intended to make the combined company the world's largest malt producer.
