= Nogent-sur-Seine =

Subprefecture and commune in Grand Est, France

- Subprefecture and commune
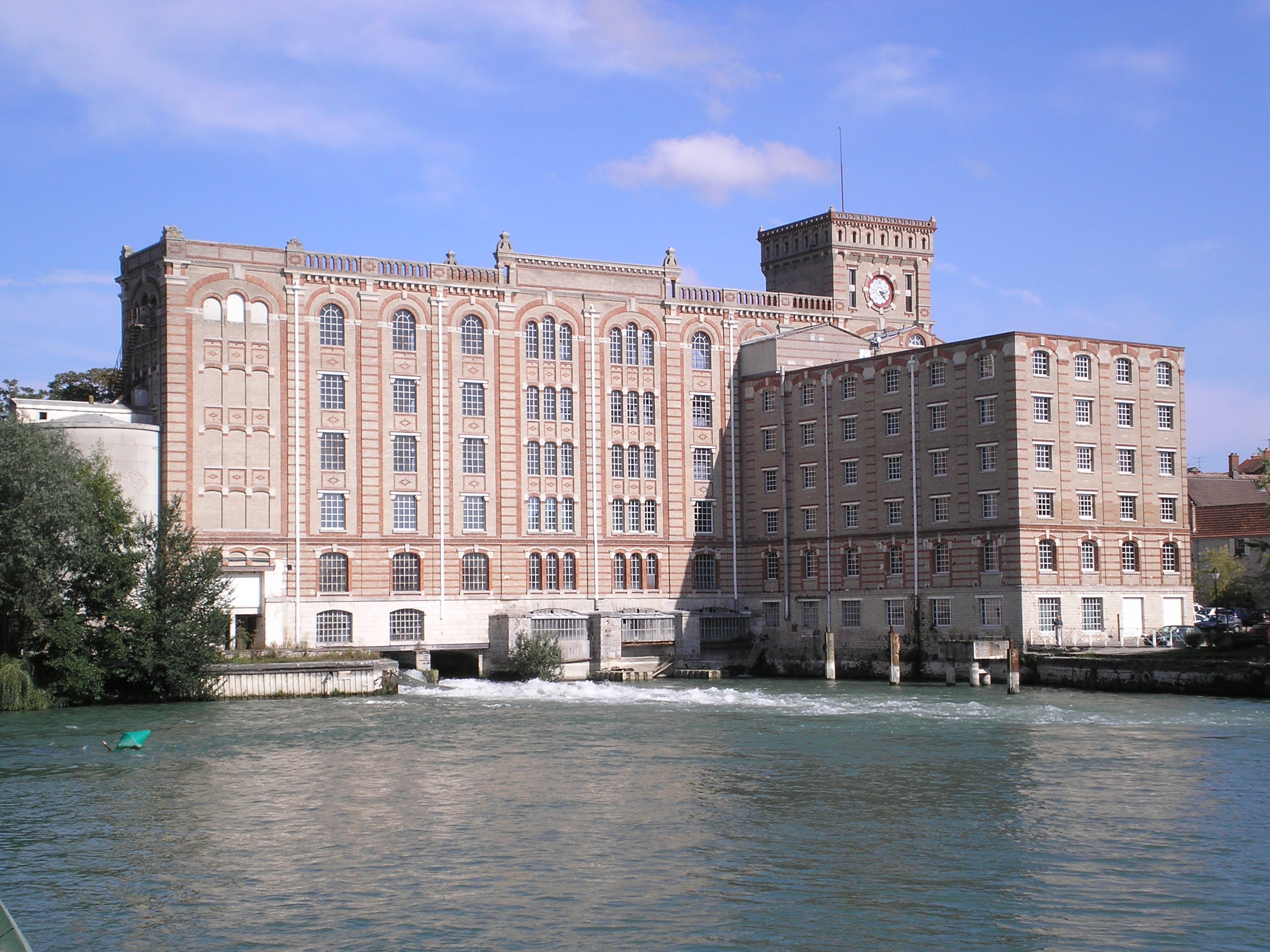
- Watermill on the Seine

- Coat of arms
- Location of Nogent-sur-Seine
- Location within France Location within Grand Est
- Coordinates: 48°29′39″N 3°30′12″E
- Country: France
- Region: Grand Est
- Department: Aube
- Arrondissement: Nogent-sur-Seine
- Canton: Nogent-sur-Seine
- Intercommunality: Nogentais

Government
  - Mayor (2020–2026): Estelle Bomberger-Rivot
- Area^{1}: 20.08 km^{2} (7.75 sq mi)
- Highest elevation: 113 m (371 ft)
- Lowest elevation: 60 m (200 ft)
- Population (2023): 5,537
  - Density: 275.7/km^{2} (714.2/sq mi)
- Time zone: UTC+01:00 (CET)
  - Summer (DST): UTC+02:00 (CEST)
- INSEE/Postal code: 10268 /10400
- ^{1} French Land Register data, which excludes lakes, ponds, glaciers > 1 km^{2} (0.386 sq mi or 247 acres) and river estuaries.

Nogent-sur-Seine (French pronunciation: [nɔʒɑ̃ syʁ sɛn]) is a commune in the Aube department in north-central France. The headquarters of The Soufflet Group is located here, as is the Musée Camille Claudel. The large Nogent Nuclear Power Plant is also located here.

== Population ==
Historical population

Year	Pop.	±% p.a.
1793	3,174	—
1800	3,201	+0.12%
1806	3,158	−0.23%
1821	2,926	−0.51%
1831	3,277	+1.14%
1836	3,355	+0.47%
1841	3,383	+0.17%
1846	3,515	+0.77%
1851	3,469	−0.26%
1856	3,486	+0.10%
1861	3,530	+0.25%
1866	3,641	+0.62%
1872	3,474	−0.78%
1876	3,435	−0.28%
1881	3,469	+0.20%
1886	3,652	+1.03%
1891	3,704	+0.28%
1896	3,723	+0.10%
1901	3,818	+0.51%

Year	Pop.	±% p.a.
1906	3,829	+0.06%
1911	3,976	+0.76%
1921	3,373	−1.63%
1926	3,611	+1.37%
1931	3,683	+0.40%
1936	3,631	−0.28%
1946	3,589	−0.12%
1954	3,333	−0.92%
1962	3,777	+1.58%
1968	4,447	+2.76%
1975	4,671	+0.70%
1982	5,009	+1.00%
1990	5,505	+1.19%
1999	5,963	+0.89%
2007	5,984	+0.04%
2012	5,992	+0.03%
2017	5,980	−0.04%
2023	5,537	−1.27%

Source: EHESS and INSEE (1968-2023)

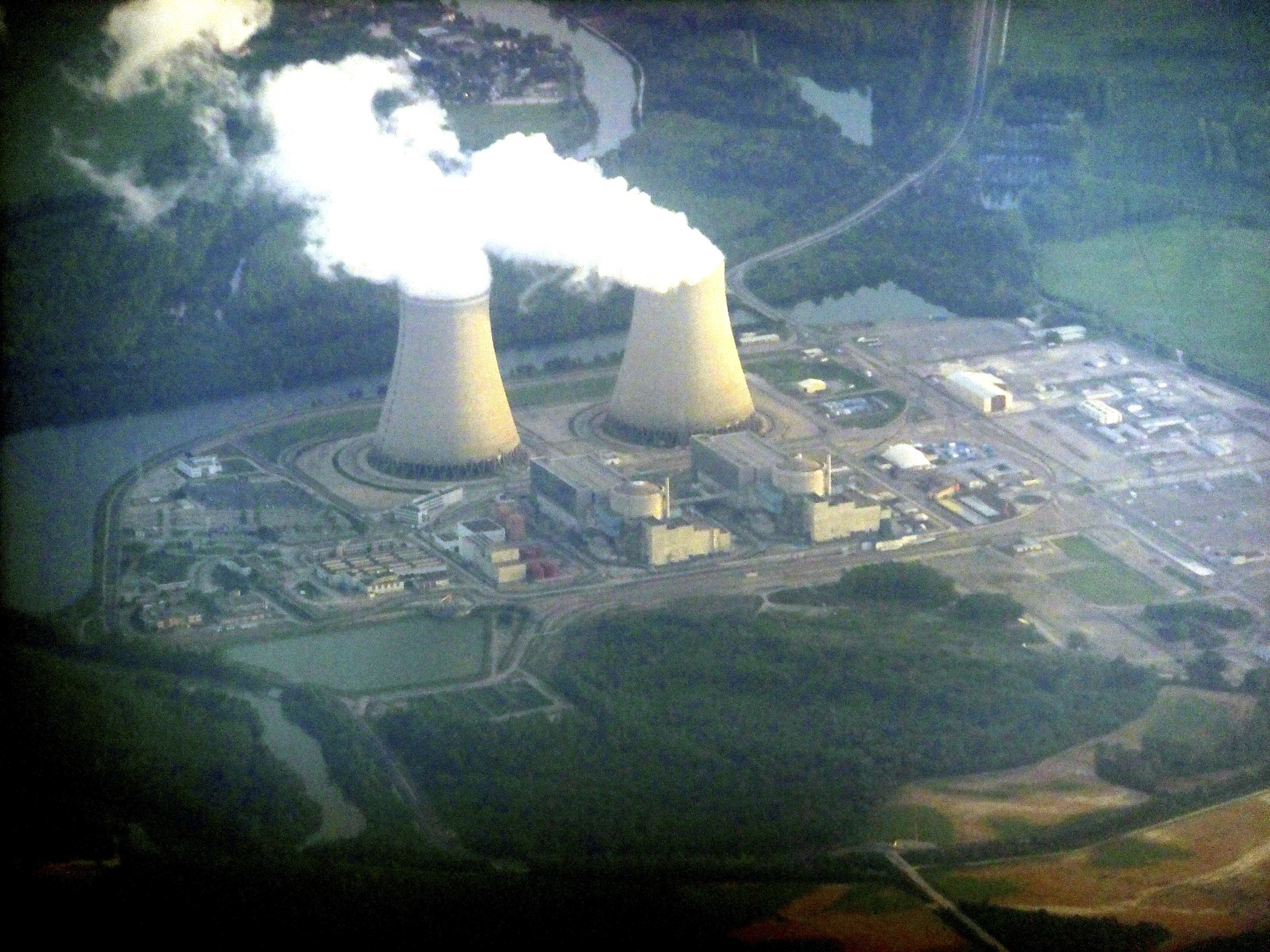
Nogent Nuclear Power Plant from the air, 2012

== Notable figures ==
Sculptor Alfred Boucher was born and raised here. He later expanded his career in Paris, where he also acted as a teacher and mentor to younger sculptors.

Camille Claudel, known as a sculptor, lived in Nogent-sur-Seine with her family from 1876 to 1879.

Frédéric Moreau, the hero of Gustave Flaubert's novel Sentimental Education, is identified as a native of Nogent-sur-Seine.

The abbey of Nogent-sur-Seine was destroyed during the French Revolution. Fragments of it were used in 1817 in making the canopy over the graves of Pierre Abélard and Héloïse d'Argenteuil at the Père Lachaise Cemetery.

== International relations ==
Nogent-sur-Seine is twinned with:

- Rielasingen-Worblingen, Baden-Württemberg, Germany - since 1973
- Joal-Fadiouth, Senegal - 1987

== See also ==
- Communes of the Aube department
- List of medieval bridges in France
- Paul Dubois (sculptor)
