= Sakuntala (Claudel) =

Sculpture by Camille Claudel

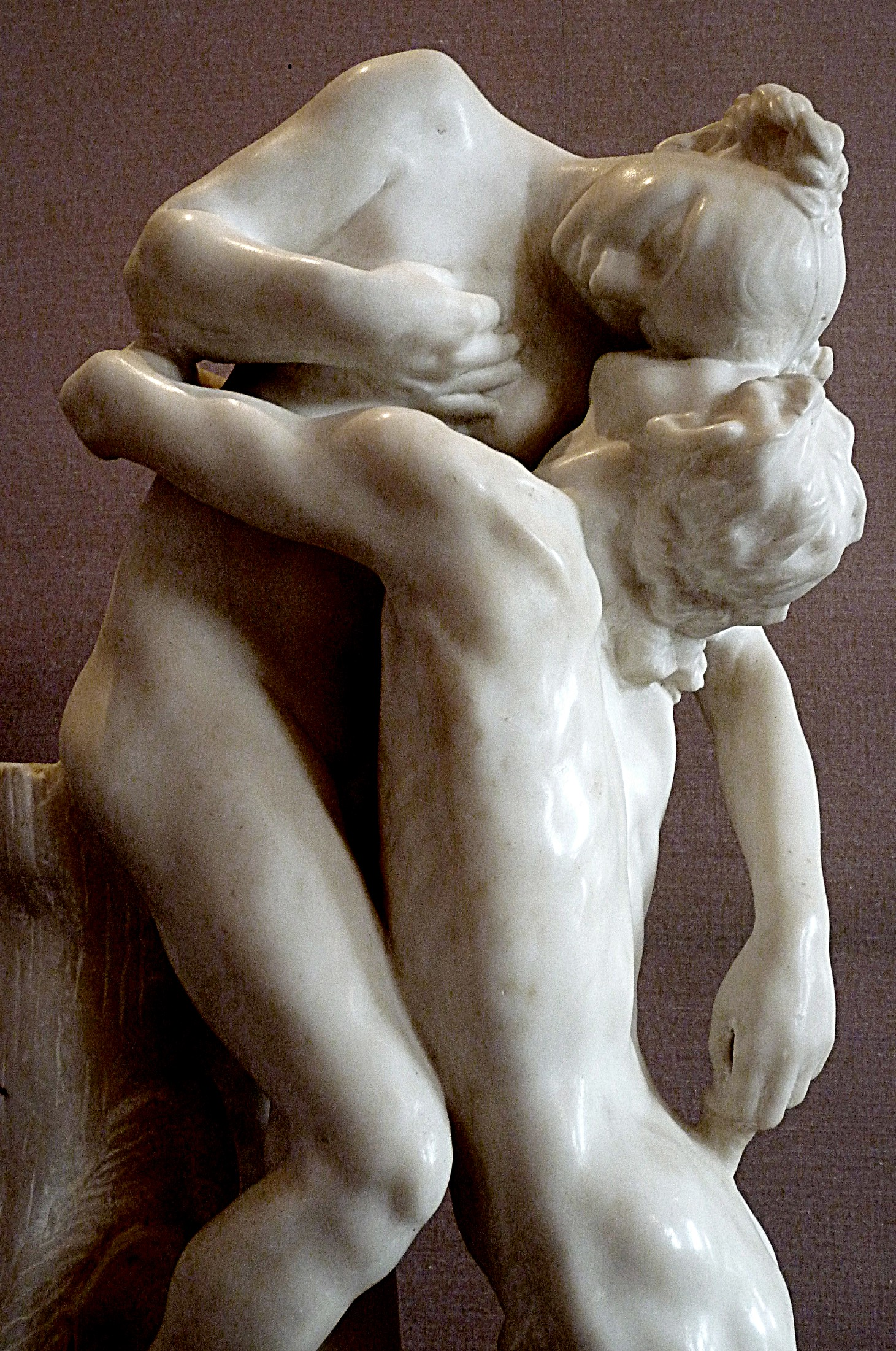
- Vertumnus and Pomona
- Artist: Camille Claudel
- Year: 1905
- Medium: Marble
- Location: Musée Rodin, Paris

Sakuntala, also known as Sakountala or Çacountala, is a sculpture by the French artist Camille Claudel, made in several versions in different media from 1886, with a marble version completed in 1905, and bronze castings made from 1905. The sculpture depicts a young couple, with a kneeling man embracing a woman leaning towards him. It was named after the play Shakuntala by the 4th-5th century Indian poet Kālidāsa, and is inspired by the moment when the title character Shakuntala is reunited with her husband Dushyanta after a long separation.

A terracotta study c.1886 is held by the Musée d'Orsay in Paris, an 1888 completed plaster version is held by the Musée Bertrand in Châteauroux, a marble version completed in 1905 and renamed Vertumnus et Pomona is held by the Musée Rodin in Paris, and several bronzes were cast for Eugène Blot from 1905 entitled L'Abandon ("The Abandonment"). L'Abandon has been described as "one of the most famous and recognised masterpieces created by Camille Claudel".

== Background ==
Camille Claudel came to Paris in 1882 to study sculpture. She became a student of Auguste Rodin in 1884, and she became his associate and lover. He eventually refused to marry her, reluctant to end his long-term relationship with Rose Beuret, mother of his son and later his wife. This love triangle, and an abortion in 1892, caused a separation between Claudel and Rodin, but they remained on reasonable terms until 1898, when she moved away and opened her own studio.

== Description ==
Claudel started on the work c.1886, with two designs in terracotta, and a third (now lost) probably in clay or plaster. These terracotta studies were sold in 2017, with one bought by the Musée d'Orsay in 2017 for €467,800, and the second sold for €65,000.

In connection with her early work on the piece, on 8 November 1889 Claudel wrote to her friend Florence Jeans: "I’m now working on my two larger-than-life figures and I have two models per day: a woman in the morning, a man in the evening. You can understand how tired I am: I regularly work 12 hours a day, from 7 in the morning until 7 in the evening, and when I get home, it's impossible for me to remain standing and I go directly to bed."

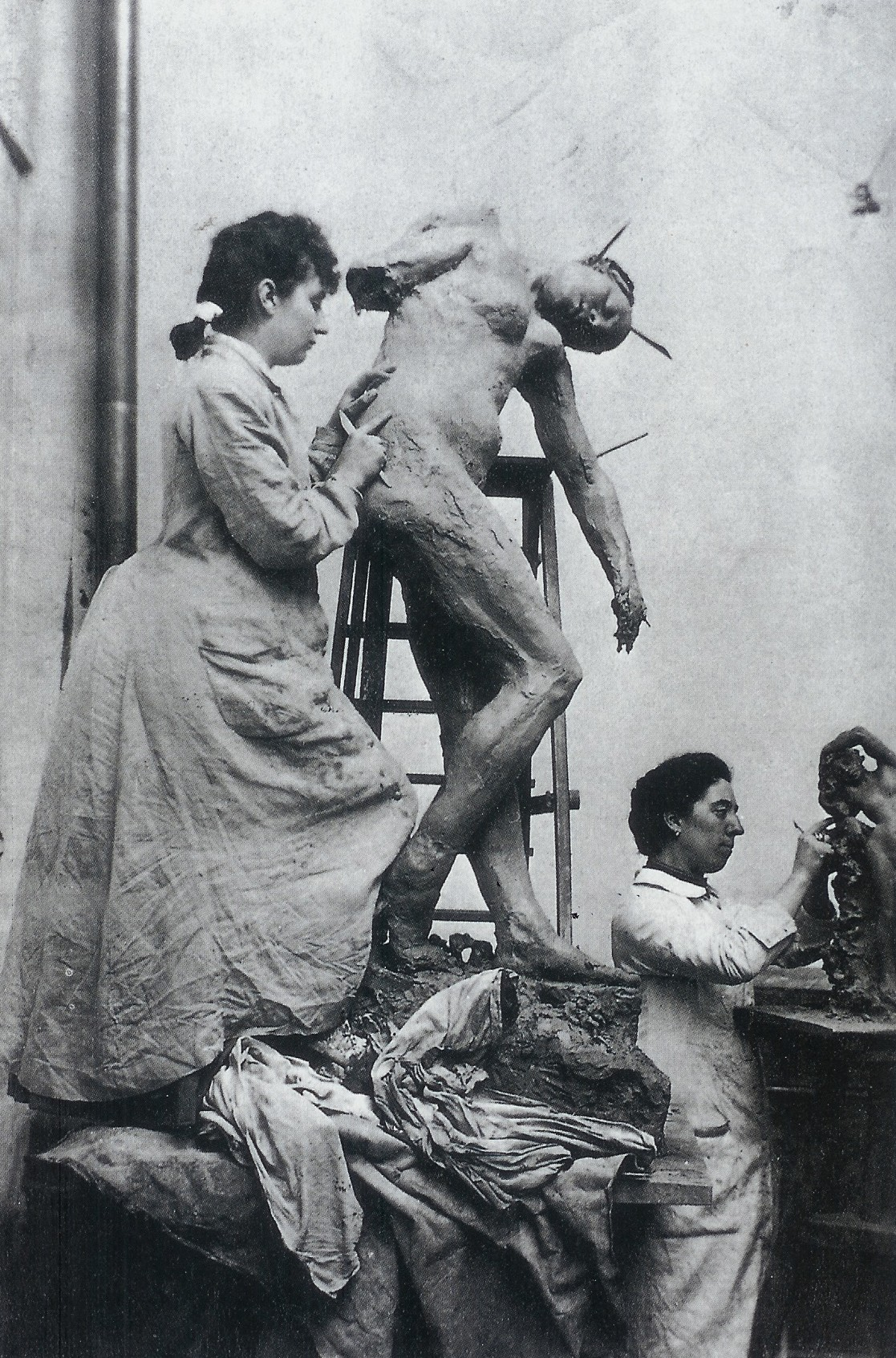
Claudel working on the plaster version, in 1887

The sculpture was one of Claudel's first major independent works. She completed a fully realised plaster version of the sculpture in 1888, which became an important milestone in the recognition of Claudel as a talented artist in her own right. The large work measured 190 cm × 110 cm × 60 cm (75 in × 43 in × 24 in), and was a critical success when exhibited at the Salon des Artistes Français in 1888, winning an honourable mention, but no commission to create a bronze or marble version was forthcoming. Rodin, with assistance from Gustave Geffroy, sought a government commission for a marble version of Sakuntala in 1895, but a commission failed to materialise. Claudel donated the plaster version to the Musée Bertrand in Châteauroux in 1895.

Claudel's plaster sculpture may have been influenced by Rodin's 1882 sculpture The Kiss (Le baiser) and his c.1884 Eternal Springtime (L'Éternel Printemps), but in turn it inspired Rodin's 1890-1893 sculpture The Eternal Idol (L'Eternelle idole), and there are further echoes in his 1889 L'homme et sa pensée. Her brother Paul was particularly annoyed at any comparison with The Kiss as he considered Sakuntala to be far superior.

In a 1988 biography of Rodin, Claudel's brother Paul Claudel was quoted as saying, "In my sister's group, spirit is of the essence: the man on his knees; he is pure desire, his face lifted, yearning, clasping that which he does not dare to seize, this marvellous being, this sacred flesh which, at some higher level, has been bestowed on him. She yields, blind, mute, weighted down, succumbing to the gravity that is love; one of her arms hangs down like a branch broken by its fruit, the other covers her breasts and protects this heart, the supreme sanctuary of virginity. It is impossible to imagine anything more ardent and at the same time more chaste".

Years later, Claudel was commissioned to create a smaller marble version of the sculpture by the Comtesse de Maigret, the wife of Christian de Maigret, whose bust Claudel had made in 1899. The completed sculpture, in white marble on red marble base, was completed in 1905 and measures 91 cm × 80.6 cm × 41.8 cm (35.8 in × 31.7 in × 16.5 in). It was retitled Vertumnus and Pomona, referring to the characters from Greek mythology, Pomona and Vertumnus, whose tale is recounted in Ovid's Metamorphoses. In 1952, Paul Claudel donated this marble sculpture to the Musée Rodin.

Also in 1905, bronze versions were cast for Eugène Blot, with one cast shown the Salon d'Automne in 1905 entitled L'Abandon. Blot exhibited a cast in December 1905 alongside other Claudel works that Blot had cast in bronze, including her Entreaty in two sizes, Perseus and the Gorgon, Dream by the Fire, Fortune, Intimacy, The Old Woman, The Mermaid, The Waltz and The Gossips. Blot intended to make and sell dozens of copies, with a planned edition of 25 large casts (of which only 18 numbered casts were made up to 1937) and 50 small casts (of which 14 are known). More casts were made later by the Valduani and Delval foundries.

One of the 62 cm (24 in) large bronze casts (#8) was acquired by the French state in 1907 and assigned to the Musée des Beaux-Arts de Cambrai. One of the large bronze casts (#2) was sold at Christie's in 2013 for £1,071,650, and another (#15) was put up for sale Sotheby's in 2014. A third large bronze of L’Abandon from the private collection of Camille's sister, Louise Claudel, was sold for €1,187,000 at Artcurial in Paris in 2017, in the same sale as the two c.1886 terracotta studies. One of the smaller 42 cm (17 in) casts (#2) was acquired by the Musée Camille Claudel in 2008.

Claudel works

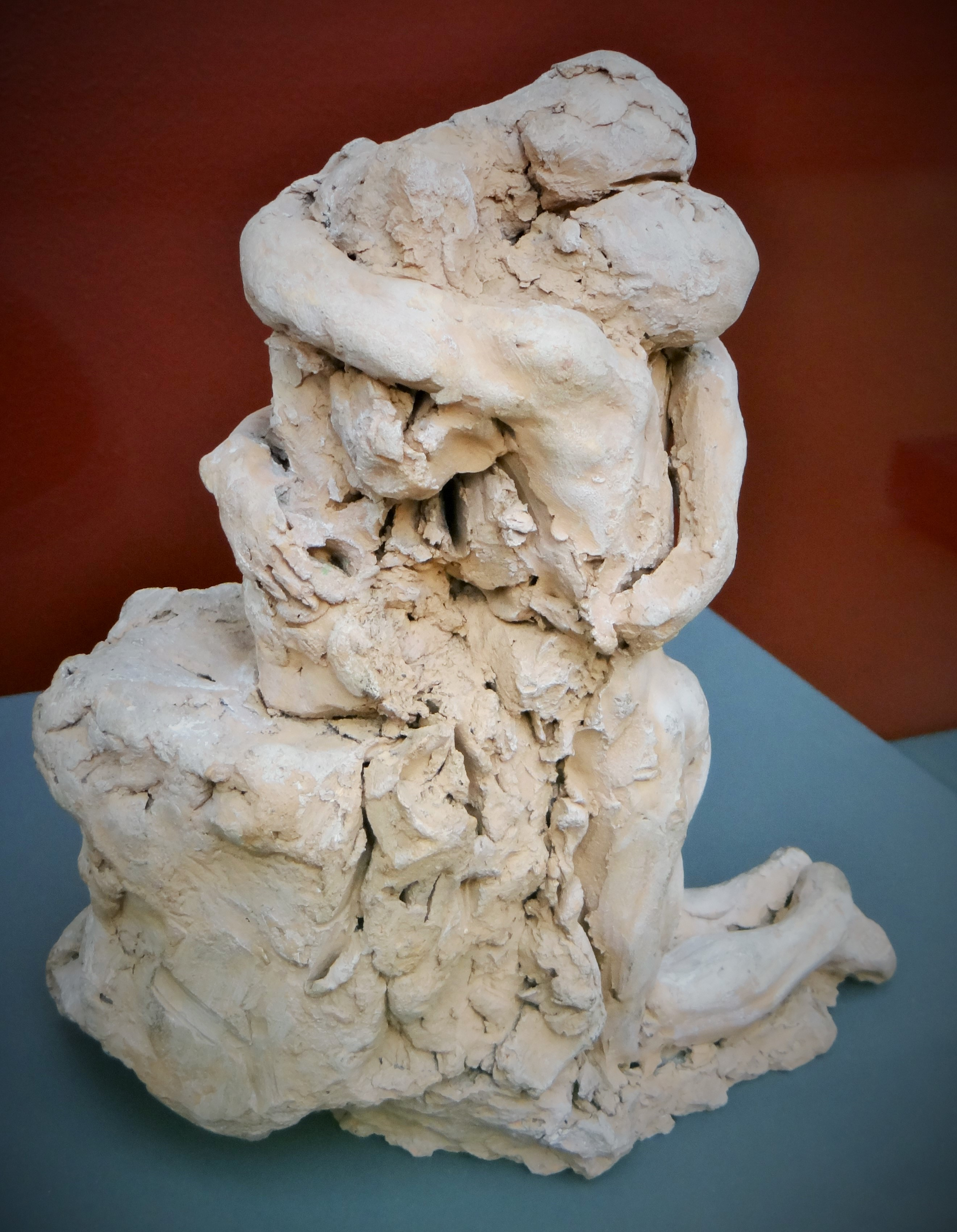
Terracotta study, c.1886

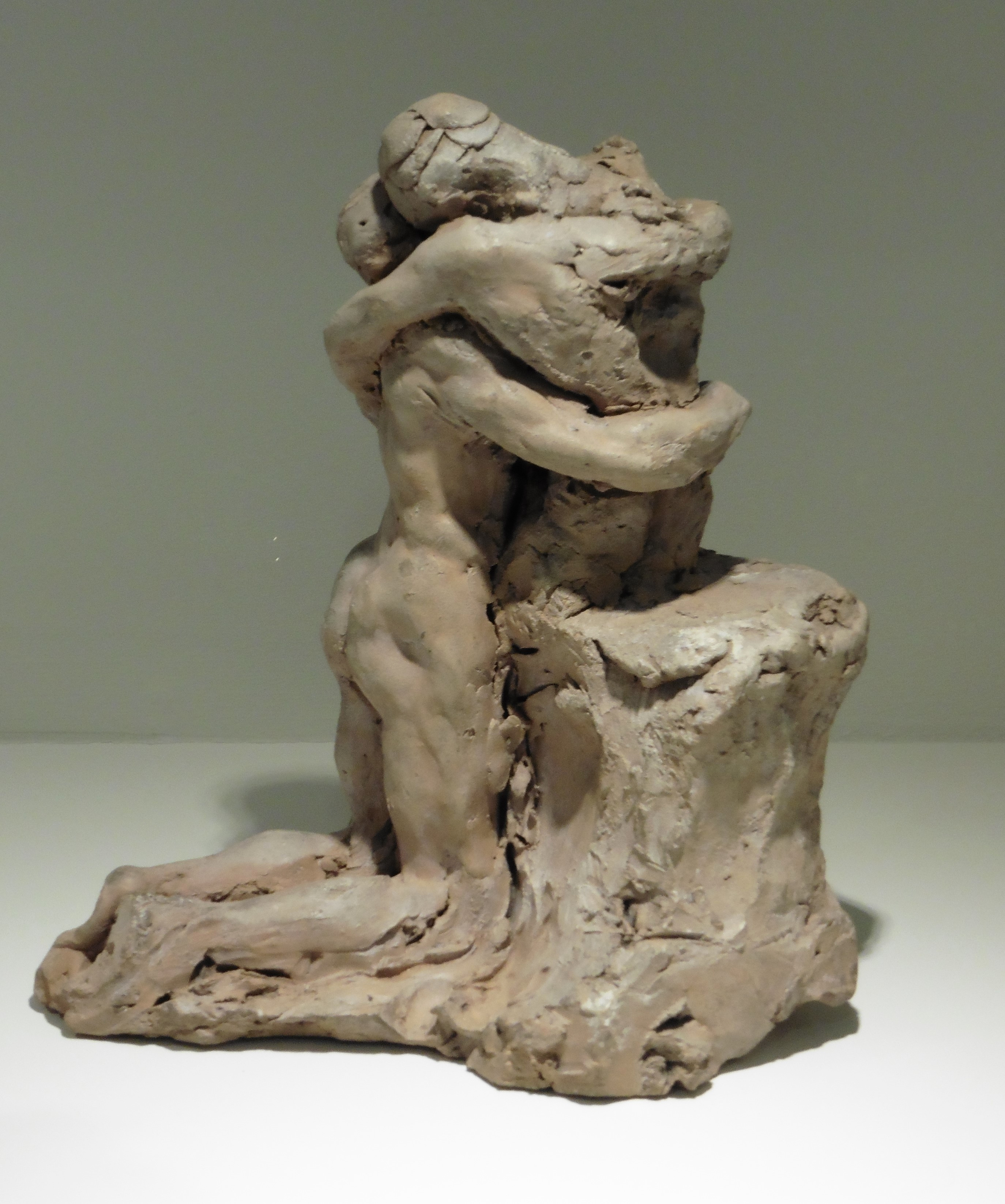
Terracotta study, c.1886, exhibited at Roubaix

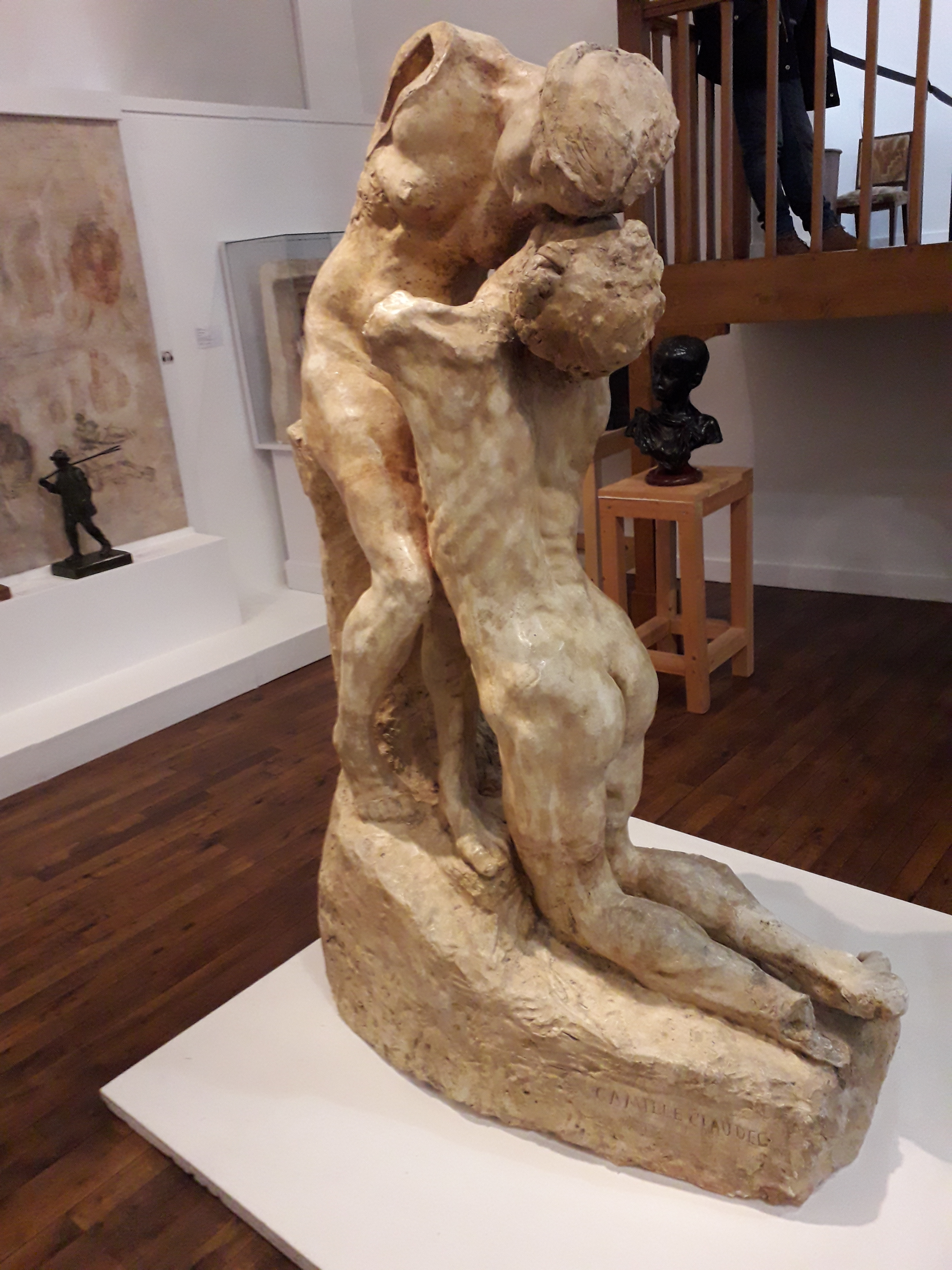
Plaster original, 1888, Musée Bertrand

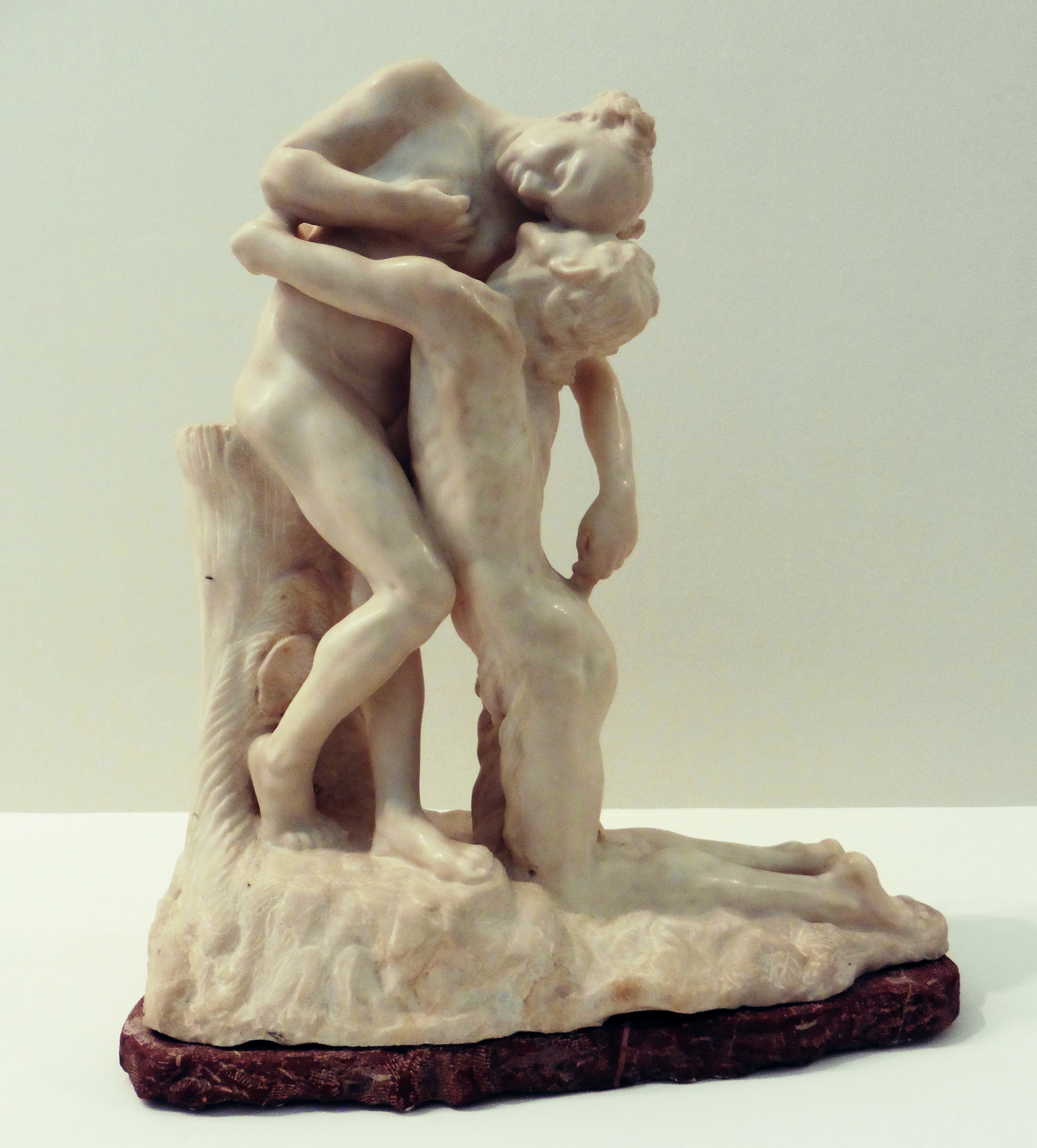
Vertumnus and Pomona, marble, 1905, Musée Rodin

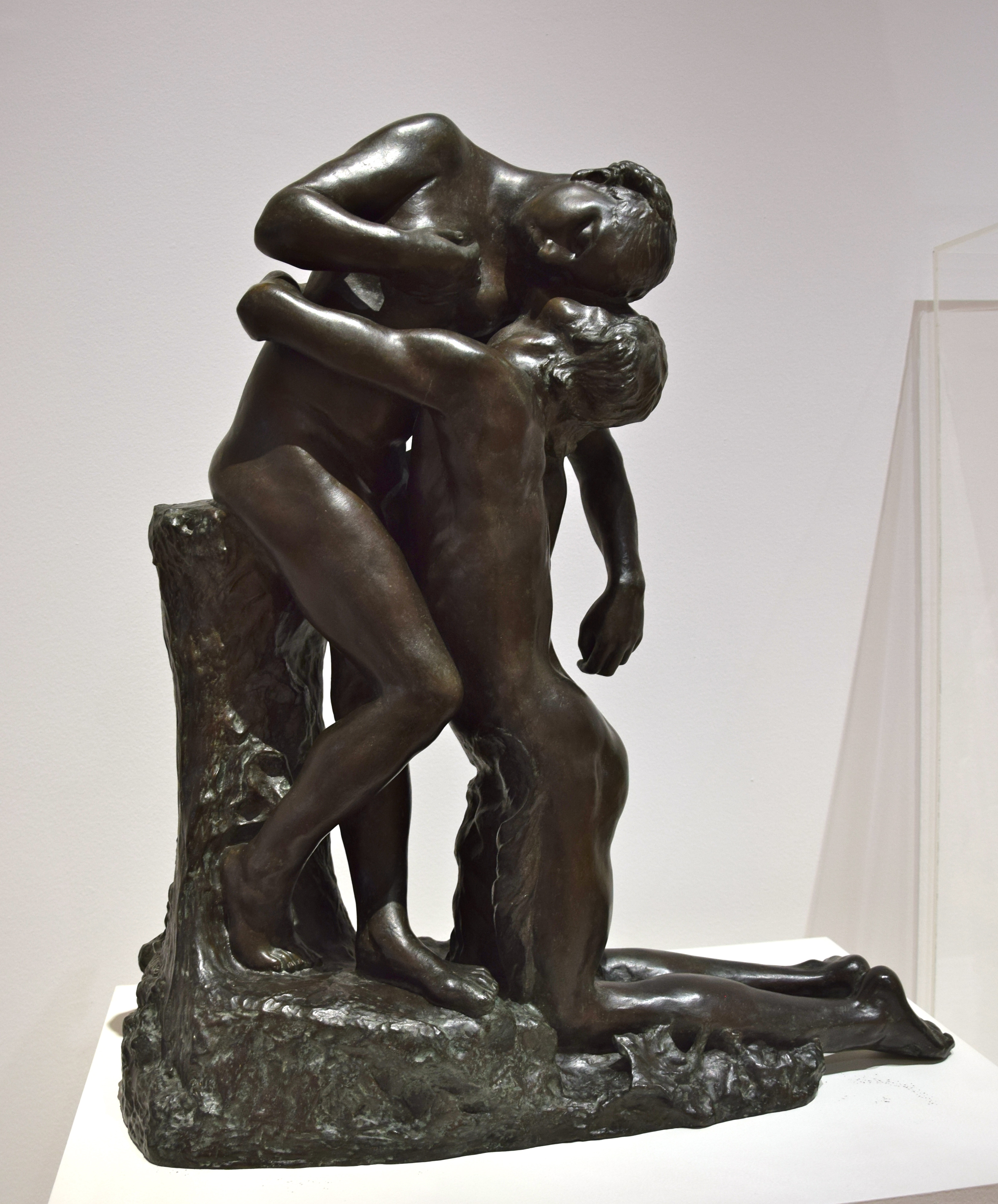
L’Abandon, 1905, Musée des Beaux-Arts de Cambrai
Rodin works

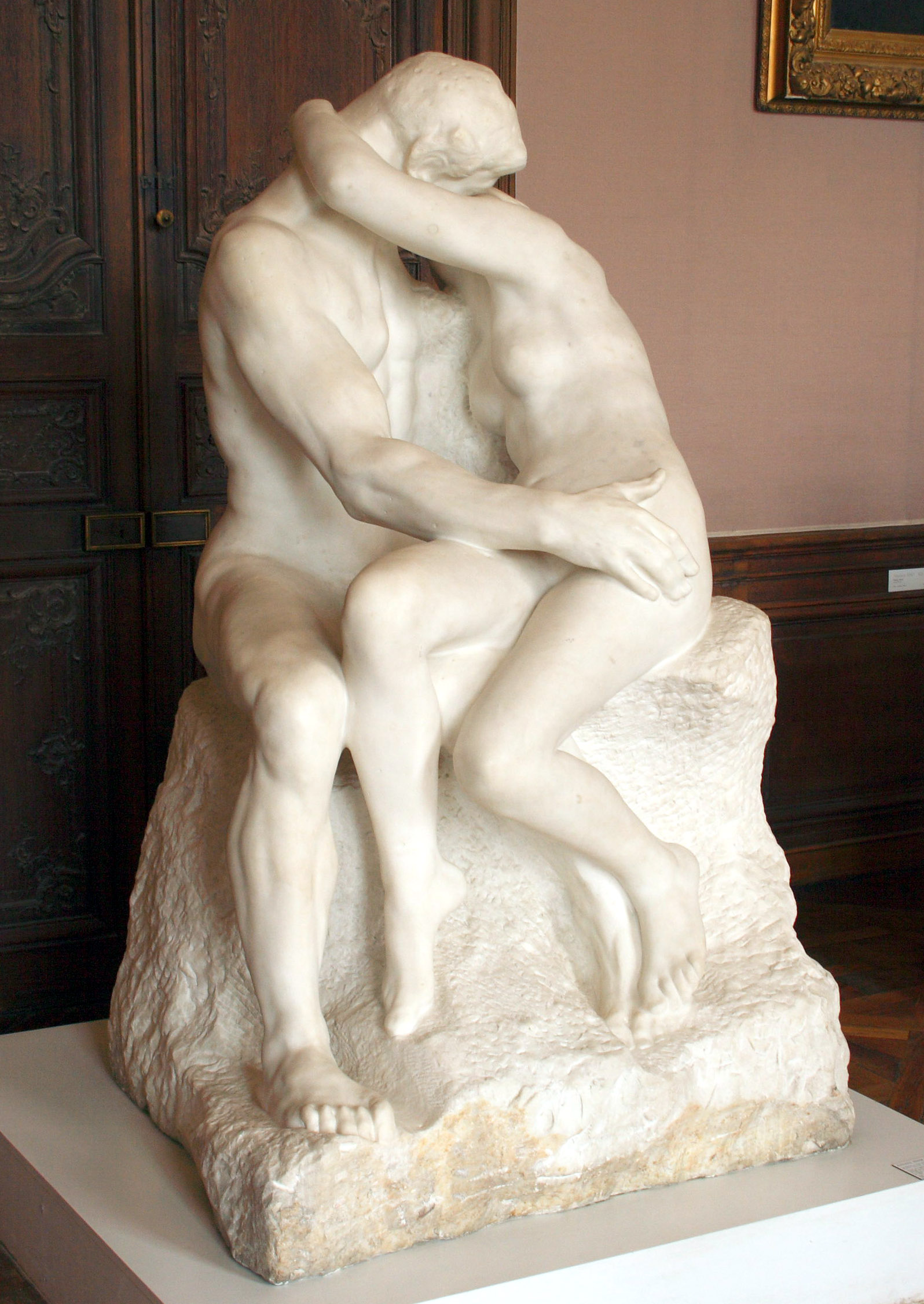
Rodin, The Kiss, 1882

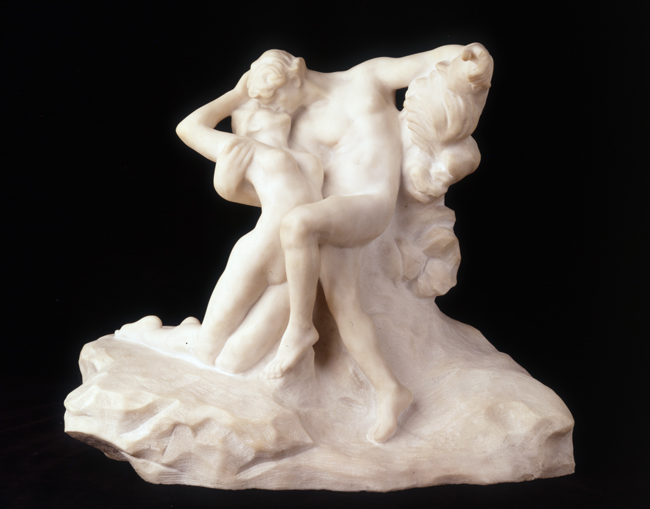
Rodin, Eternal Springtime, c. 1884

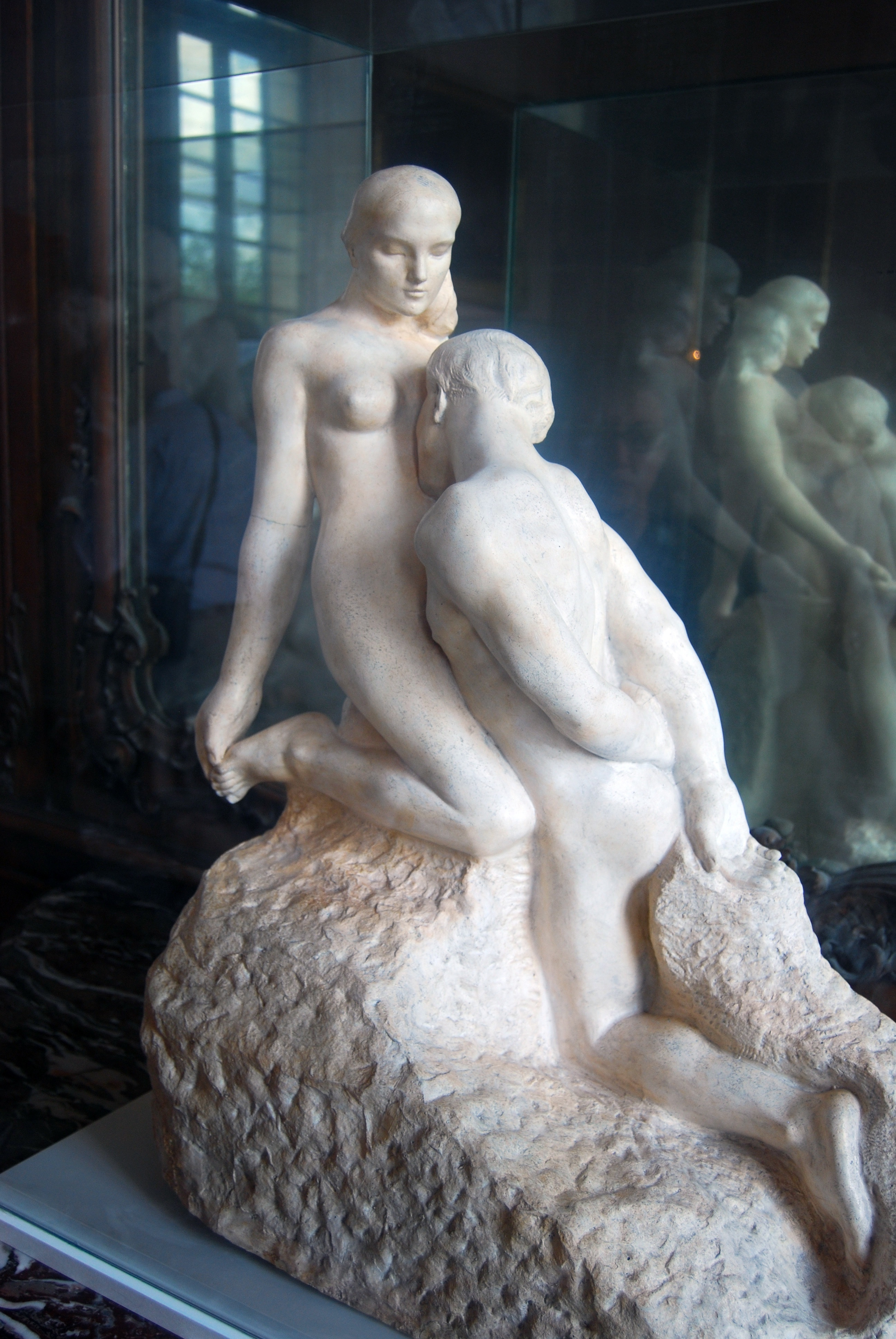
Rodin, L'Eternelle idole, marble, Musée Rodin, 1890-1893

== See also ==
- List of sculptures by Camille Claudel
