= List of sculptures by Camille Claudel =

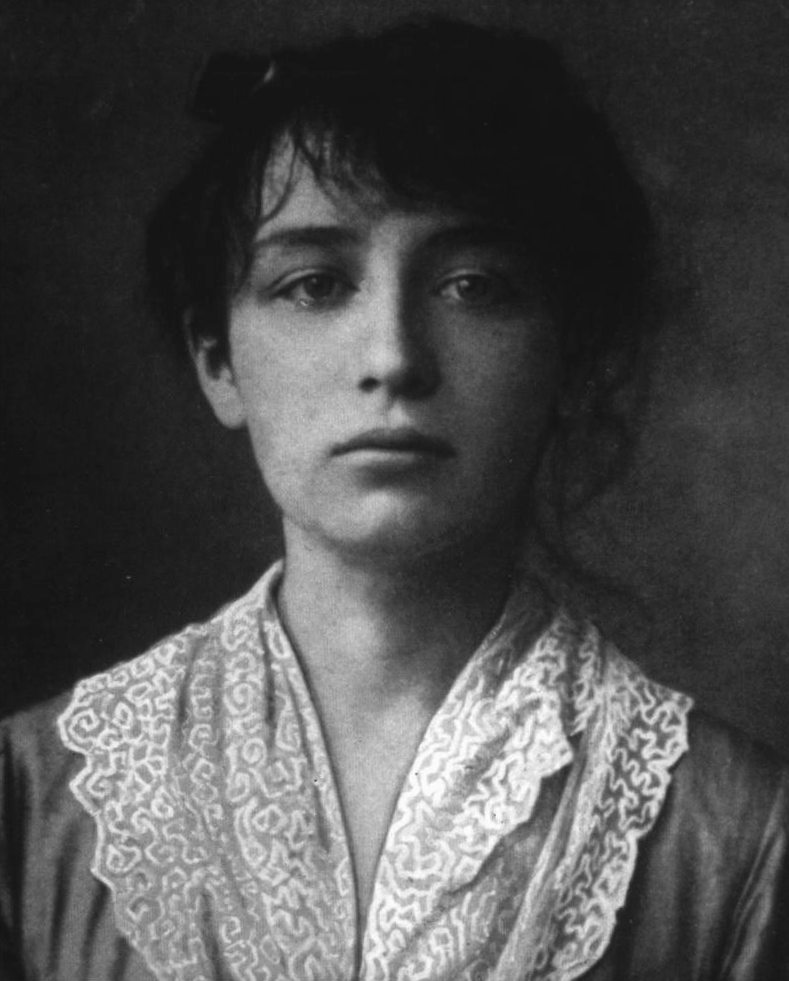
Camille Claudel before 1883

This article lists a selection of notable works created by Camille Claudel. The listing follows the 2005 book Camille Claudel.

== Sculptures ==
Image Title	Year Media Locations H x W x D in cm Wikimedia
Image online Bismarck	1879; Bronze; 37 x 24 x 23.5
Image online Diana	1881; Bronze; 18 x 10.5 x 7
Image online Head of a Young Man (Paul Claudel)	1881; Bronze; 50 x 35 x 23.8
Old Helen	1882; Bronze; 28 x 20 x 24; Musée Camille Claudel, Nogent-sur-Seine; More images
Image online Torso of Woman Standing	1881; Bronze; 49 x 16 x 35
Crouching Woman	1884; Bronze; 37.5 x 37.5 x 24.5; La Piscine Museum, Roubaix; More images
Image online Torso of a Crouching Woman	1884 to 1885; Bronze; J. Paul Getty Museum, Los Angeles; 35 x 27 x 26
Paul Claudel at 16	1884; Bronze; 48 x 42 x 22; Musée des Augustins, Toulouse; More images
Young Woman with Eyes Closed	1885; Bronze; 37 x 35 x 20; La Piscine Museum, Roubaix; More images
Image online Study for a Burgher of Calais	1885; Bronze; 15 x 10 x 13
Image online Man with Arms Crossed	1885; Bronze; 10 x 9.5 x 8
Image online Slave's Head	1885; Bronze; 13 x 8.5 x 11.5
Image online The Hand	1885; Bronze; 4 x 10 x 4.5
Giants	1885; Bronze; 32 x 26 x 27; Palais des beaux-arts de Lille; More images
Image online Man Leaning over	1886; Bronze; 42 x 19 x 28
Girl with Sheaf	1887; Terracotta; 35 x 20 x 20; La Piscine Museum, Roubaix; More images
Madame de Massary (Louise Claudel)	1885; Bronze; 45 x 31.5 x 38; Palais des beaux-arts de Lille; More images
Image online Ferdinand de Massary	1888; Bronze; 43 x 29 x 29.5
Sakountala	1888; Bronze; 188 x 108 x 59; Musée Camille Claudel, Nogent-sur-Seine; More images
Charles Augustin Lhermitte	1888; Bronze; 32 x 30 x 20; Musée Ingres Bourdelle; More images
Girl with Chignon	1888; Bronze; 17 x 9.5 x 14; La Piscine Museum, Roubaix; More images
Auguste Rodin	1888; Bronze; 40.7 x 25.7 x 28; Museo Soumaya, Mexico City; More images
The Waltz	1885 to 1905; Plaster; 41.5 x 37 x 20.5; Musée Camille Claudel, Nogent-sur-Seine; More images
Image online Study for Avarice and Lust	1885; Bronze; 15 x 10 x 10
Torso of Bald Clotho	1893; Bronze; 41 x 20 x 15; Musée d'Orsay, Paris; More images
The Little Chatelaine	1893; Plaster; 33 x 28 x 22; Musée Camille Claudel, Nogent-sur-Seine; More images
Aurora	1908; Bronze; 33.2 x 25.7 x 30.7; Musée Camille Claudel, Nogent-sur-Seine; More images
Dog Gnawing a Bone	1893; Bronze; 15 x 25.5 x 11; Museo Soumaya, Mexico City; More images
Image online Cat washing	1893; Bronze; 5.5 x 13.5 x 9
Image online God soaring	1894; Bronze; 72 x 56 x 38
Image online Head of Old Woman	1894; Bronze; 11 x 7.5 x 10.5
Image online Head of Old Man	1894; Bronze; 18 x 9 x 9
The Age of Maturity I	1893; Plaster; 87 x 103.5 x 52.5; Musée Rodin; More images
Head of Old Man	1894; Bronze; 11.5 x 8 x 12; Musée Camille Claudel, Nogent-sur-Seine; More images
The Implorer	1898; Bronze; 28.3 x 25.5 x 16; Musée Camille Claudel, Nogent-sur-Seine; More images
The Age of Maturity II	1898; Bronze; 61.5 x 85 x 37; Musée Rodin, Paris; More images
The Causeuses	1893 to 1896; Plaster; 40.6 x 40 x 40; Musée d’Art et d’Histoire de Genève; More images
Old Blind Man Singing	1894; Bronze; 11 x 10 x 11.5; Musée Camille Claudel, Nogent-sur-Seine; More images
Image online Study for the Hamadryad	1895; Bronze; 19.5 x 10 x 13
The Wave	1897; Marble, onyx, bronze 60 x 47 x 60; La Piscine Museum, Roubaix; More images
Image online Woman Reading a Letter	1897; Bronze; 38 x 39 x 27.5
Deep Thought	1898; Bronze; 24 x 22 x 27.5; La Piscine Museum, Roubaix; More images
Fireside Dream	1899; Bronze and marble 22 x 29.5 x 24.5; La Piscine Museum, Roubaix; More images
Image online Fortune	1900; Bronze; 47.5 x 35.5 x 20.5
Perseus and the Gorgon	1897 to 1902; Bronze; 51 x 30 x 25; La Piscine Museum, Roubaix; More images
Image online Bust of Woman	1903; Bronze; 40 x 22 x 12
Image online Truth Leaving the Well	1903; Bronze; 48 x 32 x 19
Image online Head of a Child	1904; Bronze; 6.5 x 9 x 6.5
The Flute Player	1903; Bronze; 53 x 26 x 34; Musée Camille Claudel, Nogent-sur-Seine; More images
Wounded Niobid	1905 to 1906; Bronze; 26,5 x 7 x 7 La Piscine Museum, Roubaix; More images
Paul Claudel at Age 37	1905; Bronze; 40 x 30 x 25; Musée Camille Claudel, Nogent-sur-Seine; More images
Abandonment	1905; Bronze; 62 x 57 x 27; La Piscine Museum, Roubaix; More images

== Museums ==
- J. Paul Getty Museum, Los Angeles
- Musée Camille Claudel, Nogent-sur-Seine
- Musée d'Art et d'Histoire (Geneva)
- Musée des Augustins, Toulouse
- Musée d'Orsay, Paris
- Musée Ingres Bourdelle, Montauban
- Musée Rodin, Paris
- Museo Soumaya, Mexico City
- La Piscine Museum, Roubaix
- Palais des beaux-arts de Lille

== See also ==
- Sakuntala (1888)
- Bust of Auguste Rodin (1888–1889)
- The Waltz (1883–1905)
- The Mature Age (1894–1900)
- Perseus and the Gorgon (1902)
