= The Waltz (Claudel) =

Sculpture by Camille Claudel

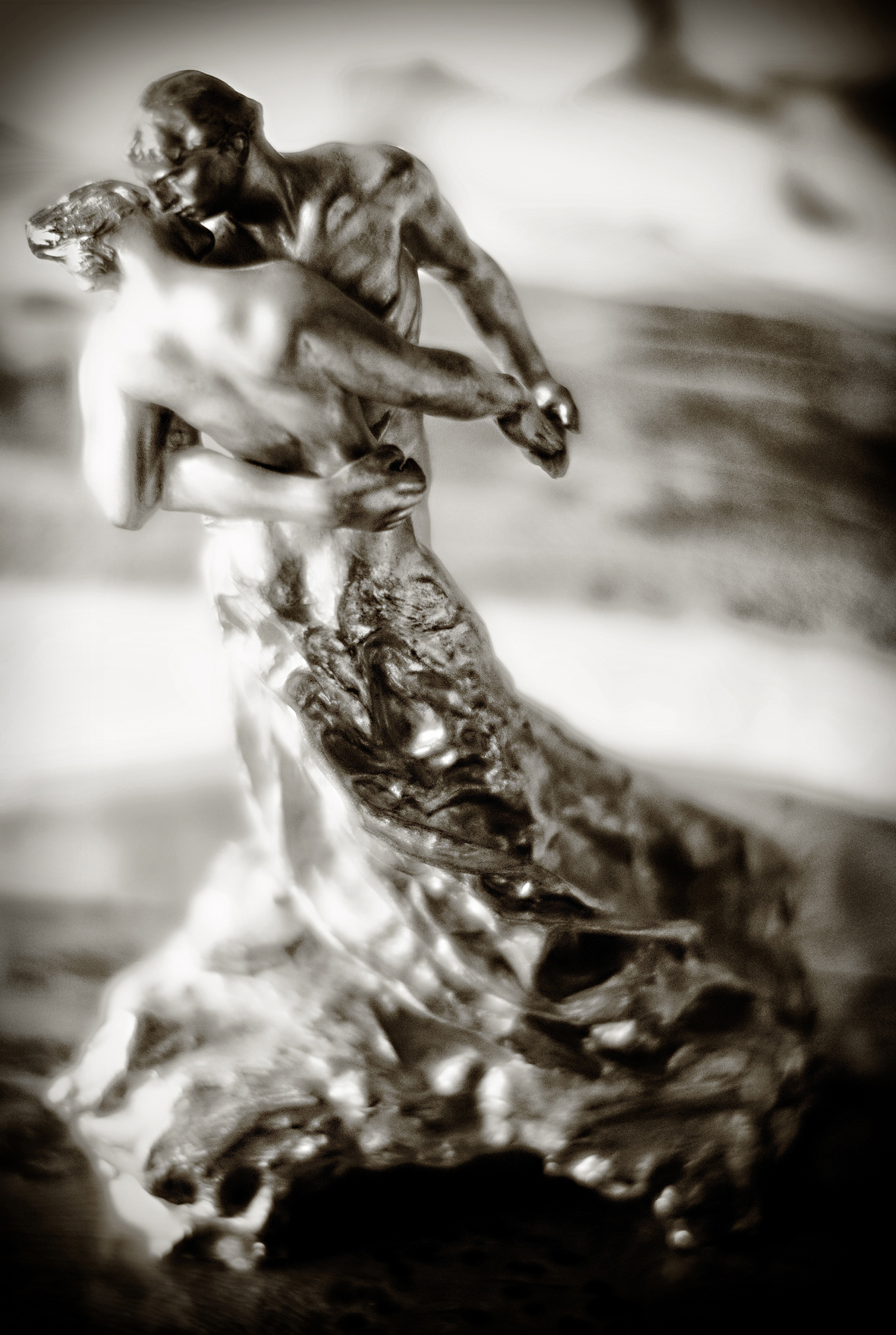
- The Waltz, a 1905 cast of the second version
- Artist: Camille Claudel
- Year: 1889–1905

The Waltz (French: La valse) or The Waltzers (French: Les valseurs) is a sculpture by the French artist Camille Claudel. It depicts two figures, a man and a woman, locked in an amorous embrace as they dance a waltz. The work was inspired by Claudel's burgeoning love affair with her mentor and employer Auguste Rodin. Various versions were made from 1889 to 1905, initially modelled in plaster, and later cast in bronze. Examples are held by the Musée Rodin and the Musée Camille Claudel.

== Background ==
Claudel was studying with Alfred Boucher in Paris when she was first introduced to Rodin in 1883, when she was aged 19. She joined his studio around 1884, where she assisted him with ongoing works such as his Gates of Hell and Burghers of Calais. She also worked on her own sculptures under Rodin's guidance. They quickly fell into a passionate romantic relationship. Claudel became increasingly frustrated with Rodin's unwillingness to break away from his long-term mistress, Rose Beuret, and their love affair ended in 1892.

Claudel and Rodin continued to work together until 1898, but their relationship deteriorated irretrievably after Rodin saw her transparently autobiographical sculpture The Mature Age, which depicts a young woman pleading with her older lover to leave his female companion.

== Description ==
Claudel began working on The Waltz in about 1889, while her relationship with Rodin was still passionate. As originally conceived, the work depicts two naked dancers, a man and a woman, in a dance hold, frozen at a moment in time in their amorous embrace. The woman's head rests tenderly on the man's right shoulder, with their bodies fluidly merging into a single shape as the man turns his head towards the woman's face as if to kiss her.

Claudel continued to work on the subject for several years, eventually seeking a public commission to create a half-life-size marble version. Her plaster model of the sculpture was reviewed in 1892 by the art critic Armand Dayot, who was working as an inspector for the French Ministry of Beaux-Arts. In his report to the ministry, he praised the sensuality and expression of the work, and the modelling of the figures, but concluded that it was not acceptable for public display due to the indecency of the naked dancers.

In response to Dayot's comments, Claudel reworked the sculpture, draping the lower half of the female figure with a flowing skirt which billows out with the twisting movement of the waltzing dancers, and curled around the dancer's heads. Dayot reviewed the amended plaster model in 1893: he was impressed with the sense of movement added by the drapery, and supported the new work, known as La valse avec voiles ("The waltz with veils"). He described it as "un gracieux enlacement de formes superbes balancées dans un rythme harmonieux au milieu de l'enveloppement tournoyant des draperies" ("a gracious intertwining of superb shapes balanced in an harmonious rhythm among swirling drapes"), concluding that Claudel was an artist with great talent.

Claudel exhibited this revised plaster model in 1893 at the Paris Salon of the Société Nationale des Beaux-Arts, but the minister Henry Roujon deemed it unacceptable for a woman to be given a public commission for artwork which included a naked man. Despite support from Rodin, the ministry declined to commission a marble version.

Emulating Rodin's reuse of figures from earlier sculptures in his later works, Claudel adapted the female figure from The Waltz as the figure of Fortune in her 1904 bronze cast.

== Casts ==
The original plaster version was bought by the founder Siot-Decauville and in 1893 produced in a single bronze cast the first version of The Waltz sometimes known as La valse avec voiles.

Claudel worked on modified versions of The Waltz from 1895 to 1898, removing the drapery around the dancers' heads to make their faces visible. Claudel made several versions of this modified sculpture, with slightly differing poses, and presented sculptures to several of her friends and acquaintances, including Claude Debussy, Robert Godet and Frits Thaulow.

The founder and art dealer Eugène Blot bought the rights to reproduce the sculpture from Siot-Decauville around 1902, and also bought the unique bronze cast of the first version. Blot sold this cast, and it was held in a private collection in Sweden until 1950, and then in another collection until sold at Sotheby's in June 2013, for £5,122,500. Blot also made bronze casts of the second version in 1905; he envisioned an edition of 50, but only 25 were made.

In addition to the bronzes, other examples exist, including a green-glazed stoneware version, one of four versions exhibited together at the Musée Camille Claudel at Nogent-sur-Seine near Paris.

== Sales ==
Several examples have been sold at auction in recent years, with prices increasing considerably.

- There were two sales of bronze casts of the second version at Christie's in New York in 2000, with one sale at $204,000 and the other at $281,000
- A cast of the second version sold at Christie's in London in 2011 for £724,450, one at Sotheby's in New York in May 2013 for $1.865 million, and one in Paris in 2014 for €829,500
- The only known cast of the first version was sold at Sotheby's in London in June 2013, for £5,122,500
- A small cast, described as a petit modèle of the second version, was sold at Sotheby's in New York in November 2013 for $869,000
- A cast, described as a grand modèle of the second version, was sold in London on 20 June 2018, with a pre-sale estimate of £700,000 to £900,000
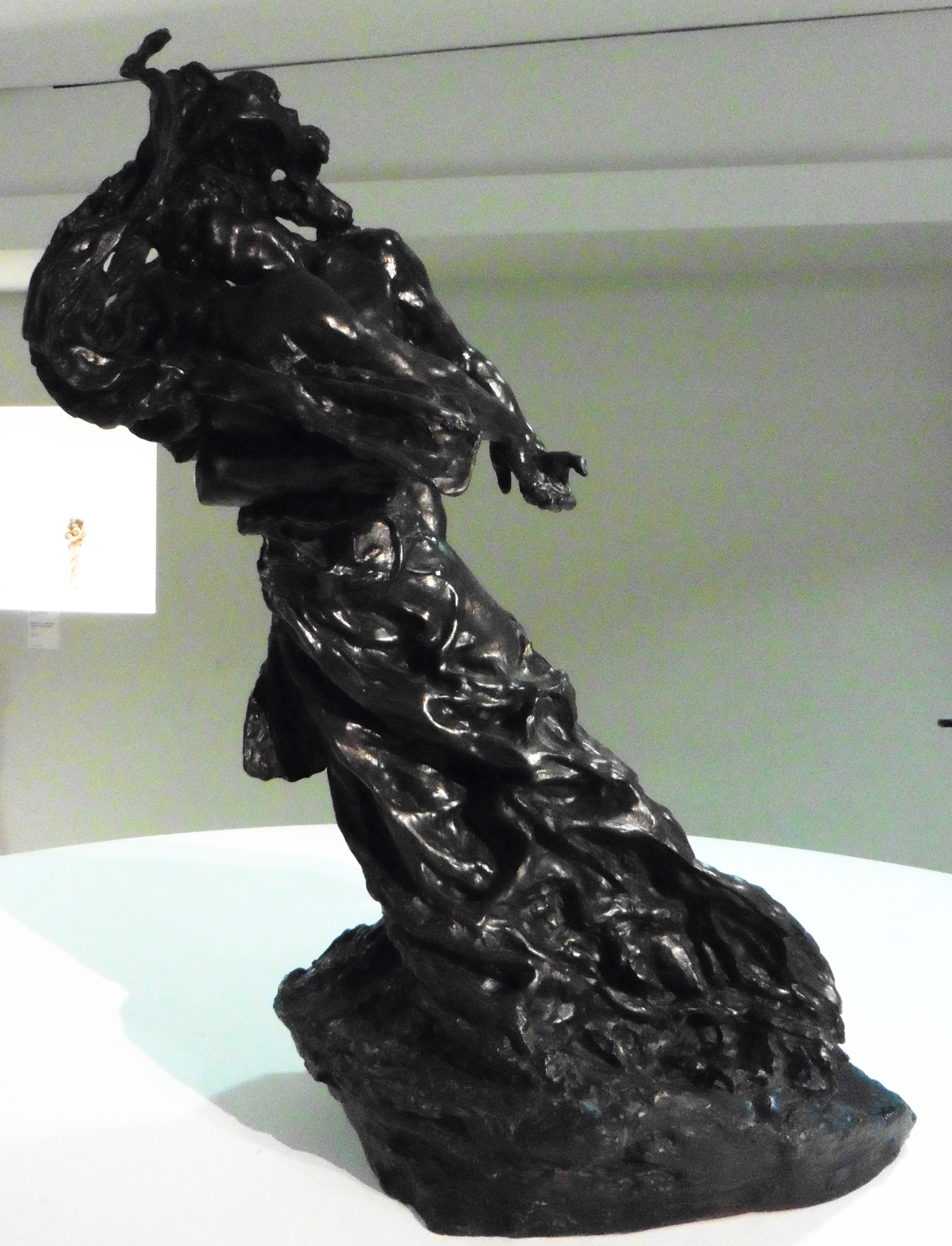
Cast of the first version, at La Piscine Museum, Roubaix, in 2015

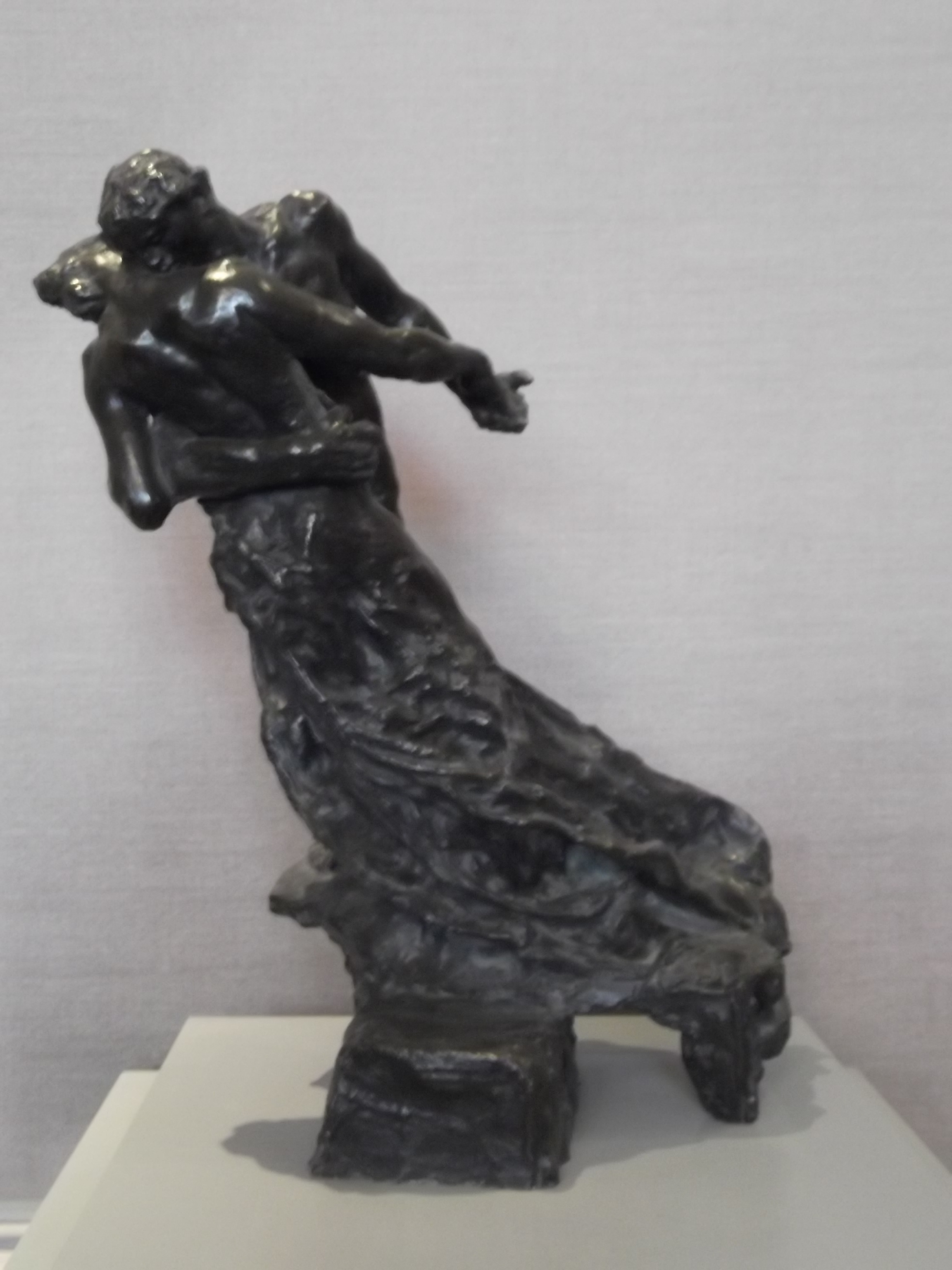
Cast of the second version, at the Musée Rodin, Paris, in 2011

== See also ==
- List of sculptures by Camille Claudel
