= Joire =

Joire is a French-language surname. Notable people of this name include:

- Jean Joire (1862–1950), French sculptor
- Paul Joire (1856–1930), French parapsychologist

== See also ==
- Saint-Joire, village in the Meuse department of France
