= The Communicant =

Painting by Tamara de Lempicka

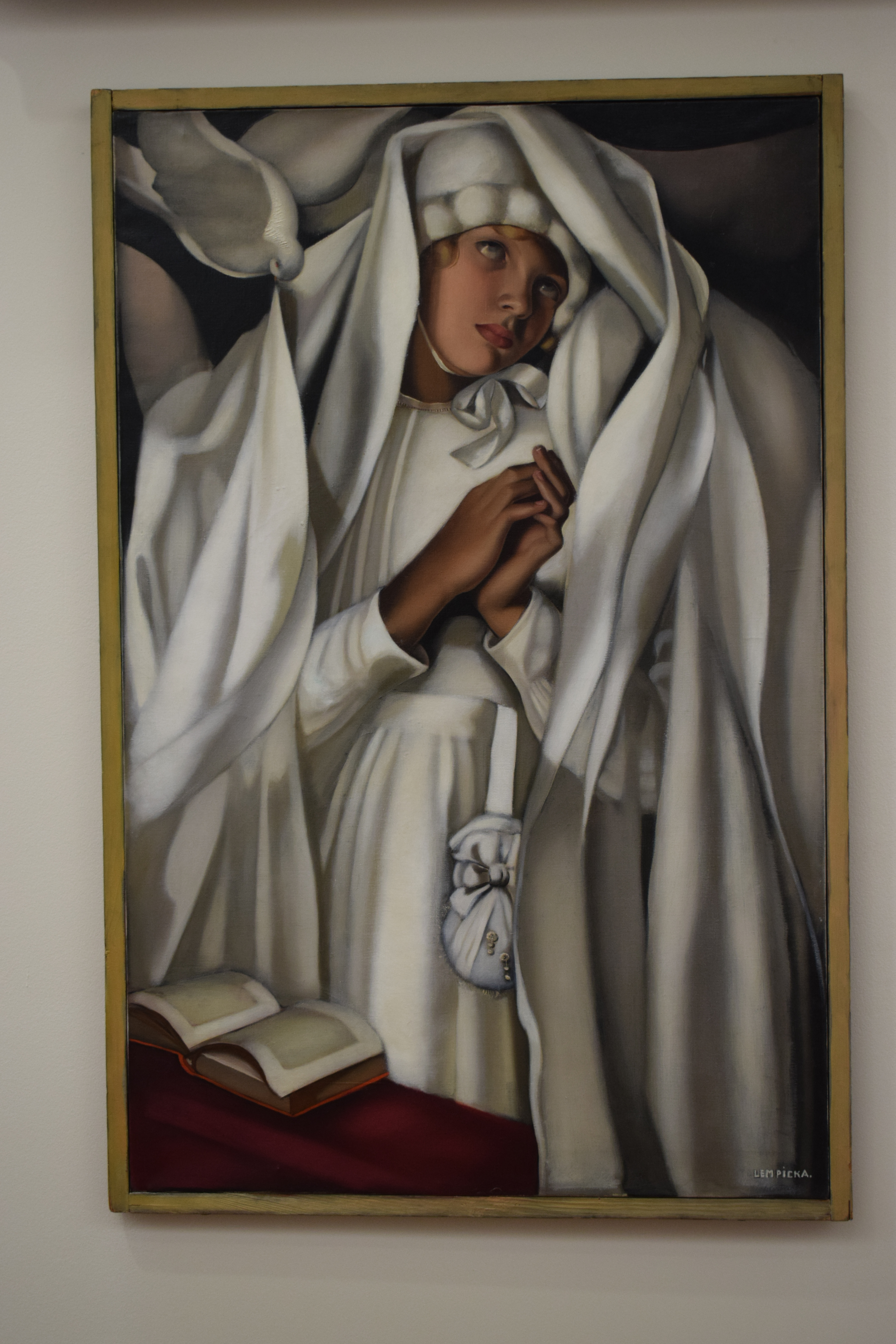
- Artist: Tamara de Lempicka
- Year: 1929
- Medium: Oil on canvas
- Movement: Art Deco
- Dimensions: 101 cm × 64.8 cm (40 in × 25.5 in)
- Location: La Piscine Museum (loan); Roubaix

The Communicant is an oil on canvas painting by Polish artist Tamara de Lempicka, from 1929. It is part of the collections of the Musée National d'Art Moderne, in Paris, on loan to the La Piscine Museum, in Roubaix.

== History and depiction ==
It is a three-quarter portrait of the artist nine-year-old daughter, Kizette, on the occasion of her First Communion. Surprisingly, her characteristic Art Deco style, with its elegant and cool beauty, nevertheless captures the purity and devotion of the child praying, while from the upper left corner a dove, symbol of the Holy Spirit, comes to adjust with its beak the wide, fine veil covering the communicant, seemingly both surrounding and floating above the little girl. The whiteness of the garment contrasts with the red lining of the prie-dieu below, where her prayer book rests open. The paintings tries to convey a sense of the purity and innocence of childhood, in connection with the sacrament of First Communion. Lempicka was from a Jewish background but had a keen interest in Roman Catholicism.

== Provenance ==
The painting was exhibited at the Salon d'Automne, and at the Salon des indépendants in 1929. It also won the same year a bronze medal at the Poznań Salon. It has been in the collections of the Musée National d'Art Moderne, in Paris, since it was donated by the artist, in 1976. Its on loan to the La Piscine Museum, in Roubaix, since 1994.
