= Perseus and the Gorgon =

Sculpture by Camille Claudel

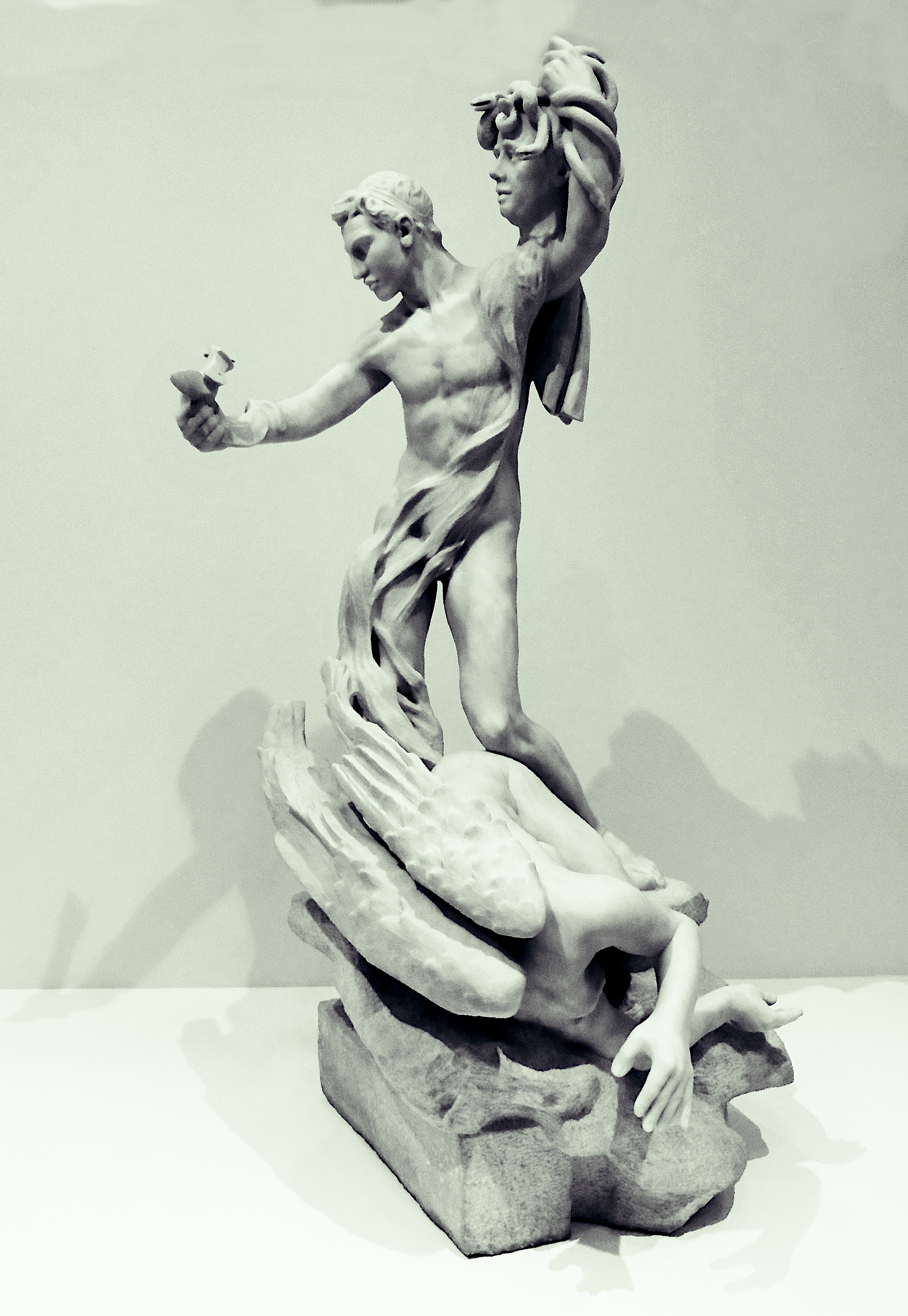
- Perseus and the Gorgon, 1905
- Artist: Camille Claudel
- Year: 1902

Perseus and the Gorgon is a 1902 monumental sculpture by Camille Claudel that portrays a scene from Greek mythology. The artist sculpted her own likeness for Medusa's face, in anger after the break-up of her romantic partnership with sculptor Auguste Rodin. The work achieved a great notoriety throughout the years.

== Description ==
The only large marble sculpture created by Camille Claudel (196 cm height, 111 cm length, 90 cm width). The work depicts Perseus after he beheaded Medusa, one of the three Gorgons. Perseus is portrayed looking toward his bronze shield as a mirror to see the reflection of Medusa's head, as looking into her eyes would turn people into stone. The work no longer has the bronze shield in which the Gorgon's face was reflected. The artwork is signed and titled on its base.

== Background and meaning ==
Claudel conceived the design of this sculpture in 1897. In 1899, the work in plaster was exhibited at the Salon de la Société Nationale des Beaux-Arts. A copy in marble was commissioned by the Countess Arthur de Maigret for her mansion on the rue de Teheran in Paris. French sculptor François Pompon participated in the carving of marble and slightly reduced the work's size. The marble sculpture was presented at the 1902 Salon de la Société Nationale des Beaux-Arts. Four years were needed to complete the sculpture, due to financial difficulties after state commission of the artwork was cancelled. That followed Rodin's withdrawal of his support for the commission in anger after seeing Claudel's sculpture The Mature Age.

This work was the last of Claudel's career. Both this piece and Claudel's sculpture The Mature Age were influenced by her break-up with her art teacher, colleague and romantic partner, sculptor Auguste Rodin. Influenced by emotion, the sculptor gave Medusa her own facial features.

== Cultural value ==
Classified as "Work of major cultural heritage interests" ("Œuvre d'Intérêt Patrimonial Majeur"), the artwork was bought in 2008 by the Musée Camille Claudel (then known as the Musée Paul Dubois-Alfred Boucher) in Nogent-sur-Seine.

== See also ==
- List of sculptures by Camille Claudel
- Perseus with the Head of Medusa (1545–1554) by Benvenuto Cellini
