= The Falling Man (Rodin) =

Sculpture by Auguste Rodin

- L'Homme qui tombe (French)
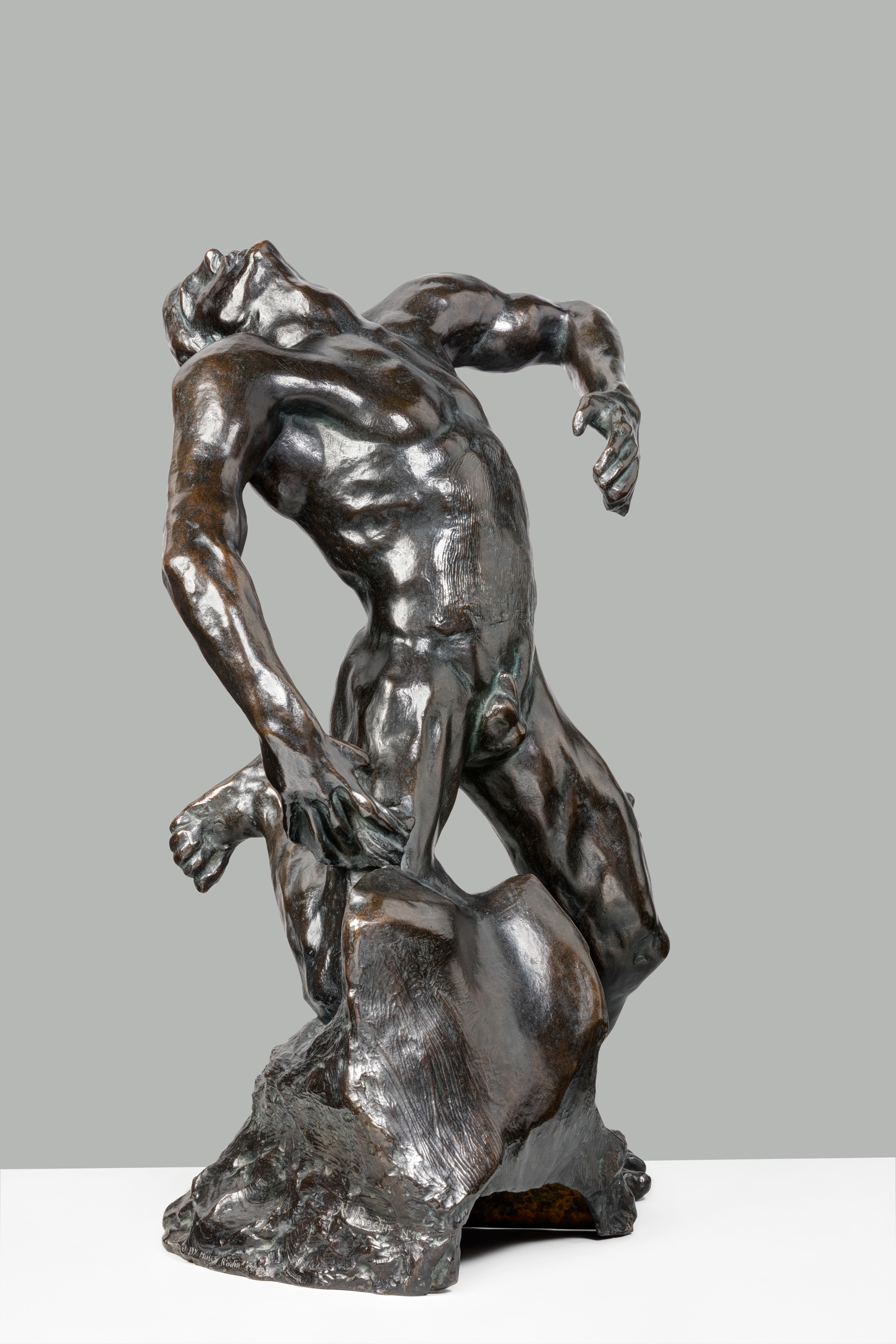
- The Falling Man, 3/4 view
- Artist: Auguste Rodin
- Year: 1882
- Type: Sculpture
- Medium: Bronze
- Dimensions: 58.8 cm × 39.9 cm × 31.2 cm (14.9 in × 10.1 in × 7.9 in)
- Location: Museo Soumaya; Mexico City

The Falling Man (in French: L'Homme qui tombe) is a sculpture by French artist Auguste Rodin modeled in 1882 and is part of Rodin's emblematic group The Gates of Hell.

== Gates of Hell ==
This figure represents the cumulative human forces, cast upon the eternal emptiness of Hell. In The Gates of Hell, the sculpture appears in three different places: at the top of the left door, at the top of the right pilaster— the one holding Crouching Woman as part of I am beautiful— and as the central piece of Avarice at the bottom of the Gates. Judging by the position of the first figure, some authors have suggested that Rodin suspected his commission would be canceled because the arched position of the man would make difficult, if not impossible, to open and close the doors, hindering its function.

Even though this figure appears in different directions in The Gates, its muscles stay the same; which hints at Rodin's idea of taking an artistic license regarding gravity. (Note: According to Elsen: Meditating on how a figure in sculpture was expected to adhere to the pull of the earth, Rodin came to ask, What if the figures could be as free of gravity in sculpture as they are in painting? (...) It was while the working on The Gates of Hell that Rodin may have pondered the tyranny of gravity over sculpture, leading to a self-interrogatory, What if I change the orientation of a well-made figure without adjusting anatomy in its new relation to gravity? The Falling man in three orientations, The Martyr and other figures from The Gates of Hell were the answer...) This concept heralds the modernist movement, which favors expression over verisimilitude.

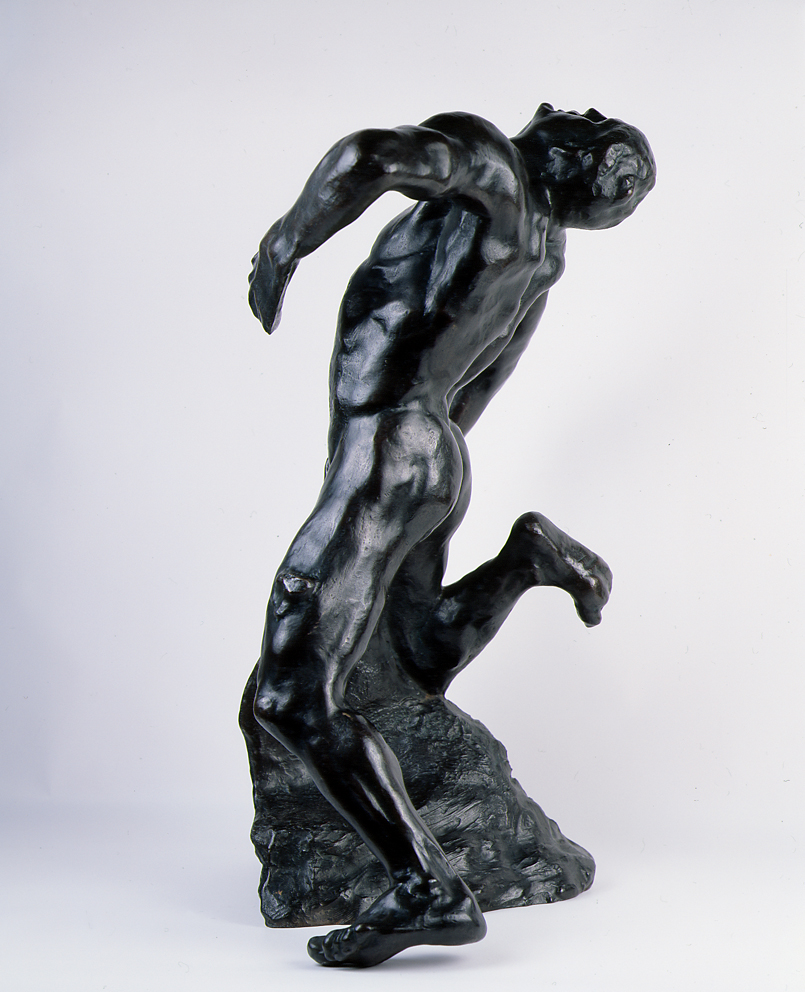
Side view

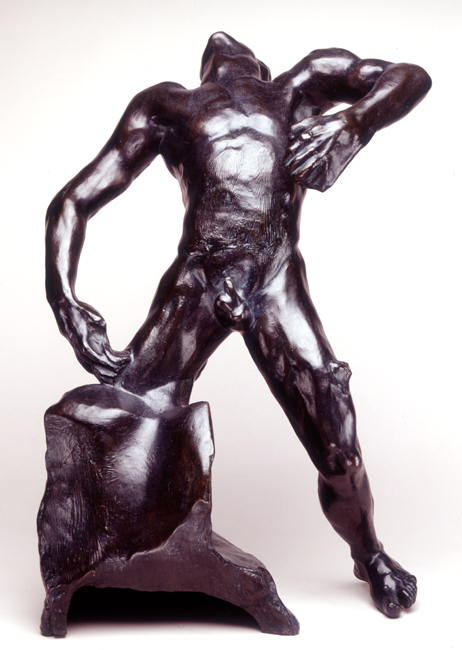
Front view

== See also ==
- List of sculptures by Auguste Rodin
