= Pierrot (short story) =

- Short story by Guy de Maupassant
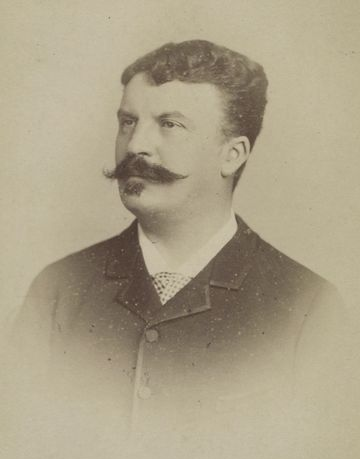
- Guy de Maupassant photo portrait
- Country: France
- Language: French

Publication
- Published in: Le Gaulois
- Publication type: Periodical
- Media type: Print
- Publication date: 1 October 1882

Chronology
- Series: Contes de la bécasse
La Folle	Menuet

"Pierrot" is a short story by French writer Guy de Maupassant. It was originally published on 1 October 1882 in the French newspaper Le Gaulois. A year later, in 1883, it appeared in the short story collection Contes de la bécasse. The story was dedicated to Henry Roujon, novelist and public servant.

== Plot ==
Ms. Lefevre, a rich, miserly widow has a dozen onions stolen from her garden. Following the advice of a neighbor, she decides to buy a small dog. The baker brings her a dog named Pierrot. He would always bark because he is hungry. He isn't even scaring the thief away.

She refuses to pay eight francs for the animal and decides to throw Pierrot into a Denehole, which is a well in which all dogs from the area end up. They slowly starve to death and eat those that have already died.

She throws Pierrot in the well, but when she hears the barking of the dog, it tears her heart. The following nights she sees Pierrot in her dreams, but she keeps refusing to pay the tax. To appease her guilty conscience, she goes every day beside the hole to throw Pierrot some bread. Then she hears a second dog in the well. She refuses to feed another dog because it was bigger and stronger. She leaves Pierrot to die.

== Editions ==
- Pierrot, Maupassant, Contes et nouvelles. Texte établi et annoté par Louis Forestier, Bibliothèque de la Pléiade, éditions Gallimard, 1974
