= The Mature Age =

Sculpture by Camille Claudel

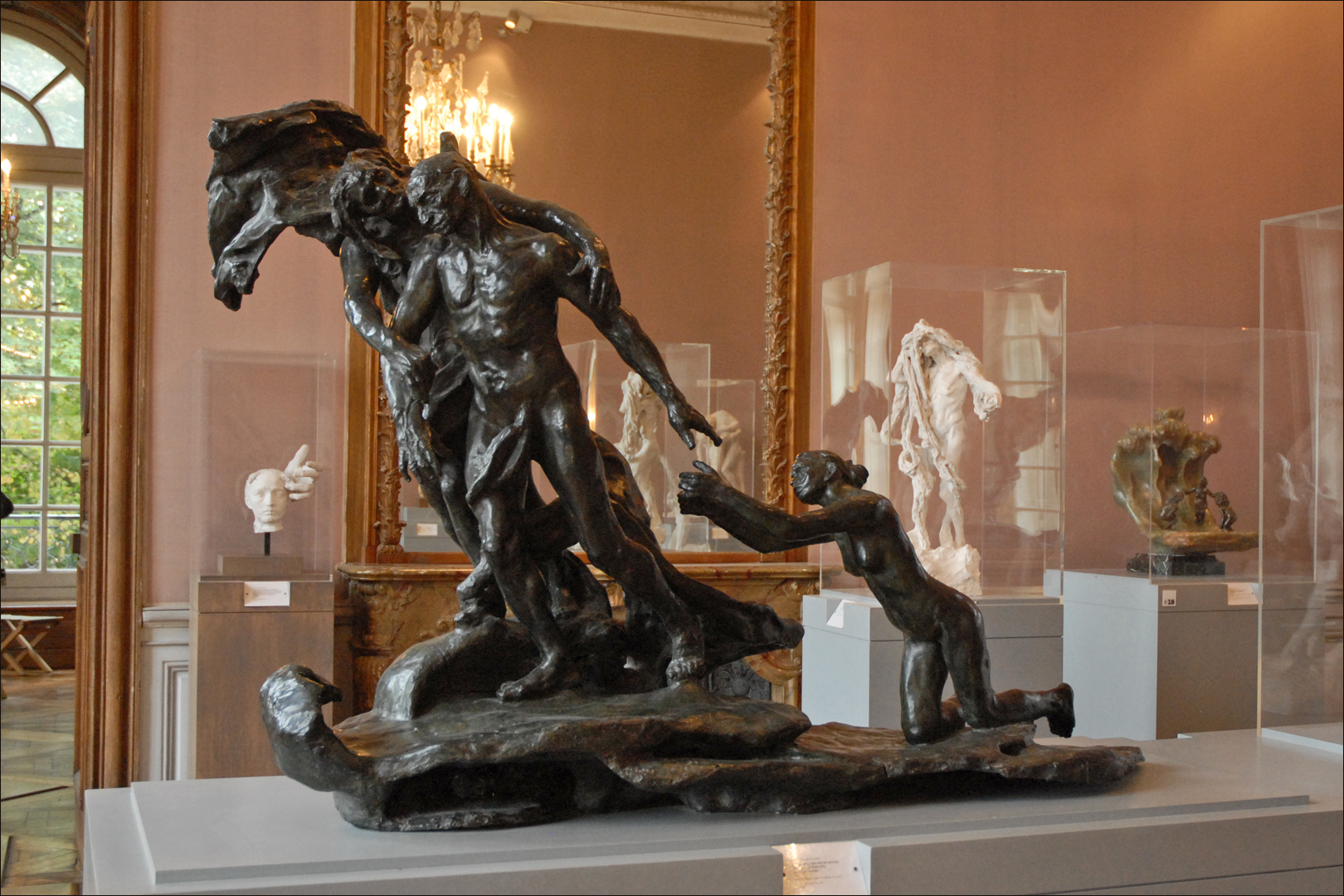
- The Mature Age, 1913 bronze casting at the Musée Rodin. The figure standing behind, ensnared in her own hair, is Clotho (1893).
- Artist: Camille Claudel
- Year: 1894–1900

The Mature Age (French: L'Âge mûr), also named Destiny, The Path of Life or Fatality (1894–1900) is a sculpture by French artist Camille Claudel. The work was commissioned by the French government in 1895, but the commission was cancelled in 1899 before a bronze was cast. A plaster version of the sculpture was exhibited in 1899, and then cast in bronze privately in 1902. A second private bronze casting was made in 1913, and it is thought that the plaster version was destroyed at that time.

The two bronzes are exhibited in Paris, the first at the Musée d'Orsay and the second at the Musée Rodin.

== Background ==
Auguste Rodin had taken Camille Claudel on as a student in 1884, and she became his associate and lover. He eventually refused to marry her, reluctant to end his long-term relationship with Rose Beuret, mother of his son and later his wife. This love triangle, and an abortion, caused a separation between Claudel and Rodin in 1892, but they remained on reasonable terms until 1898. Rodin tried to help Claudel through the agency of another person, and obtained an official commission for her from the Inspector of Fine Arts Armand Silvestre, in 1895, her first commission from the French state. The evolution of the work can be judged from official reports made by Inspector Armand Dayot.

The final rupture between Claudel and Rodin came in 1898, when she moved away and opened her own studio. The commission was cancelled in unusual circumstances in June 1899 by the Fine Arts Director, Henry Roujon.

== Description ==
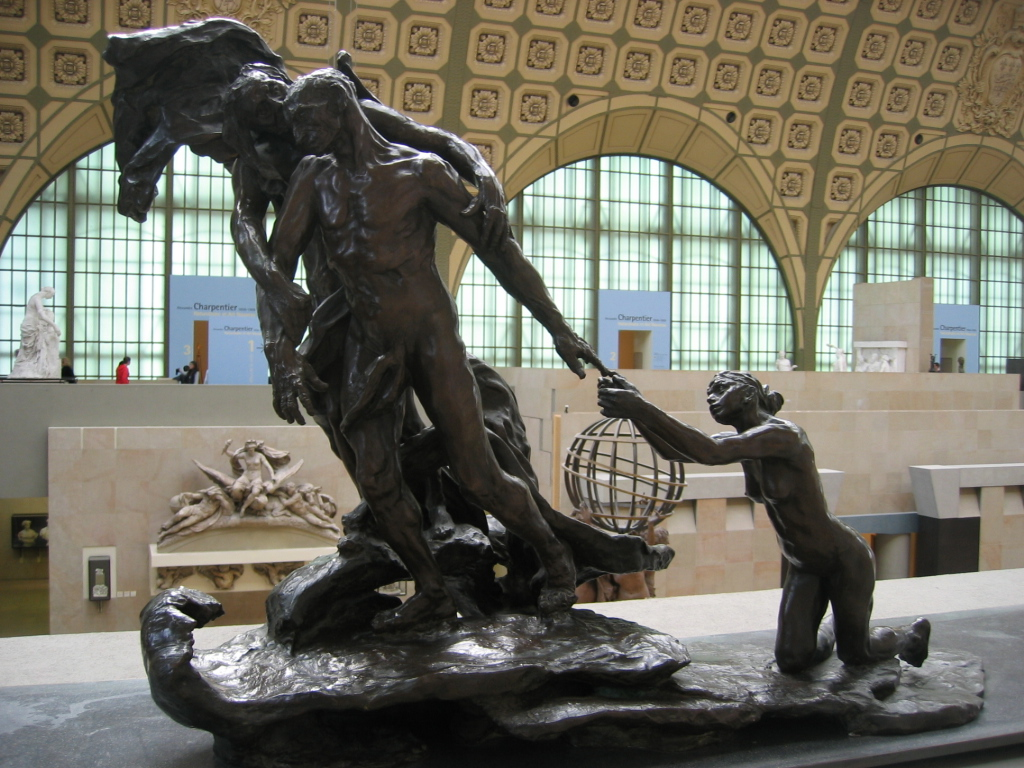
1902 bronze casting, at the Musée d'Orsay, Paris

The work comprises three naked figures with swirling drapes: a young woman kneeling has just released the hand of the second figure, an older standing man, and he is being drawn away by the embrace of the third person, an older woman. It can be viewed as an allegory of ageing, the man leaving behind youth and progressing towards maturity and eventual death; but it can also be interpreted as reflecting Claudel's abandonment by Rodin: she is pleading with Rodin, but he has returned to Beuret. Claudel explained this symbolism in letters to her brother Paul Claudel, then consul in New York. According to her, the group represents Destiny. On the basis of these letters, The Mature Age can be considered an autobiographical work.

The older woman is identified by some with the Goddess of Fates Clotho (another Claudel sculpture represented the goddess in 1893) or Venus. The young woman that represents Youth has been exhibited as Le Dieu Envolé (The God Has Flown Away), which references the story of Psyche and Cupid, whose love is forbidden by Venus.

Rodin was shocked and angered when he saw the sculpture for the first time in 1899. He cut off support for Claudel, and may have influenced the Ministry of Fine Arts to cancel their commission.

== Evolution ==
The sculpture reflects work by Claudel from at least 1893. A design from the end of 1893 is held by the Bibliothèque Nationale in Paris, and she referred to a "group of three" in a letter to her brother Paul in December 1893. Claudel made a first plaster version of the sculpture in 1894-95, with three figures, one kneeling and two standing, in a more closed composition than the final version. This first plaster version is held by the Musée Rodin. It measures 87 cm × 103.5 cm × 52.5 cm (34.3 in × 40.7 in × 20.7 in).

Claudel altered the composition to create a more dynamic second version, with two figures leaving the third behind. The revised composition was completed in 1898, and exhibited in plaster in 1899 at the Salon of the Société Nationale des Beaux-Arts.

The initial project shows the man to be resistant to the old woman but in the second project, he simply allows himself to be led away. Paul Claudel opines that these are not "the two versions of the same event, but of two chapters of a single drama."

It was cast in bronze in 1902 by Thiebaut Frères for a private client, Captain Tissier. The bronze was also exhibited at the Salon of the Société Nationale des Beaux-Arts in 1902, and at the Société des Artistes Français in 1903. It was kept by Captain (later General) Tissier and his son André until 1982, when it was bought by the Musée d'Orsay. It measures 114 cm × 163 cm × 72 cm (45 in × 64 in × 28 in) and weighs 350 kg (770 lb).

A second bronze was cast by Frédéric Carvilhani in 1913, and is exhibited at the Musée Rodin since donated by Paul Claudel in 1952. It measures 121 cm × 180 cm × 73 cm (48 in × 71 in × 29 in), on a plinth of 10 cm × 195 cm × 78 cm (3.9 in × 76.8 in × 30.7 in).

A version of the sculpture was found by chance in a flat in Paris that had been uninhabited for 15 years and was auctioned off in France on February 16, 2025 for €3.1 million.

An edition of six smaller bronze version of the complete sculpture were made for Eugène Blot, and separate bronzes of the old man and the young woman, including 20 casts of the young woman ("l'Implorante") in its original size and 100 smaller versions. The pleasing woman was known as The Vanished God in around 1905. It measures 61.5 cm × 85 cm × 375 cm (24.2 in × 33.5 in × 147.6 in).

Paul Claudel, the artist's brother, commented on the work: "Ma soeur Camille, implorante, humiliée à genoux, cette superbe, cette orgueilleuse, et savez-vous ce qui s'arrache à elle, en ce moment même, sous vos yeux, c'est son âme". ("My sister Camille, imploring, humiliated on her knees, this great proud woman, and you know what is tearing at her, right now, before your eyes, it's her soul")

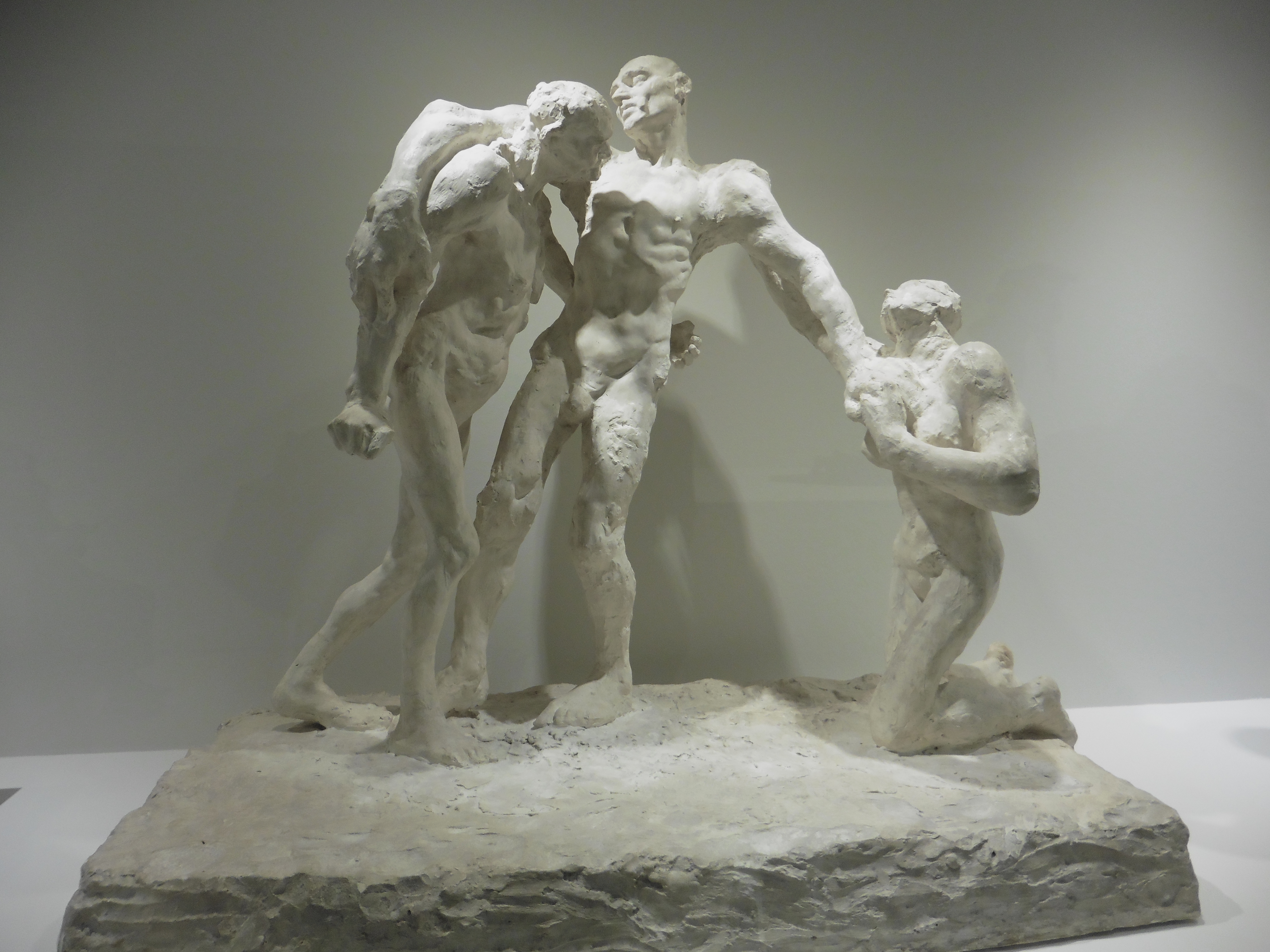
First version in plaster, exhibited in Roubaix

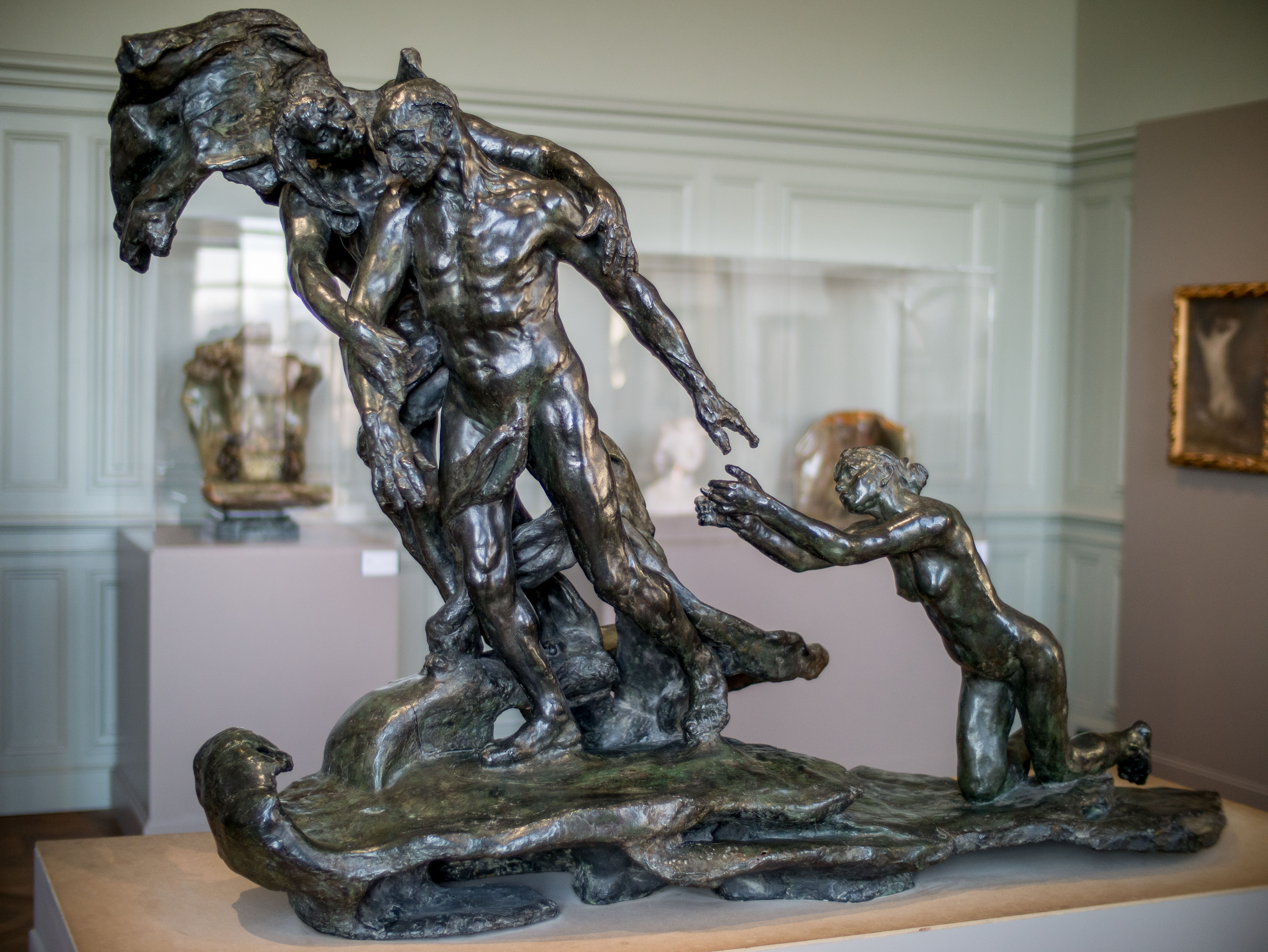
1913 bronze casting at the Musée Rodin

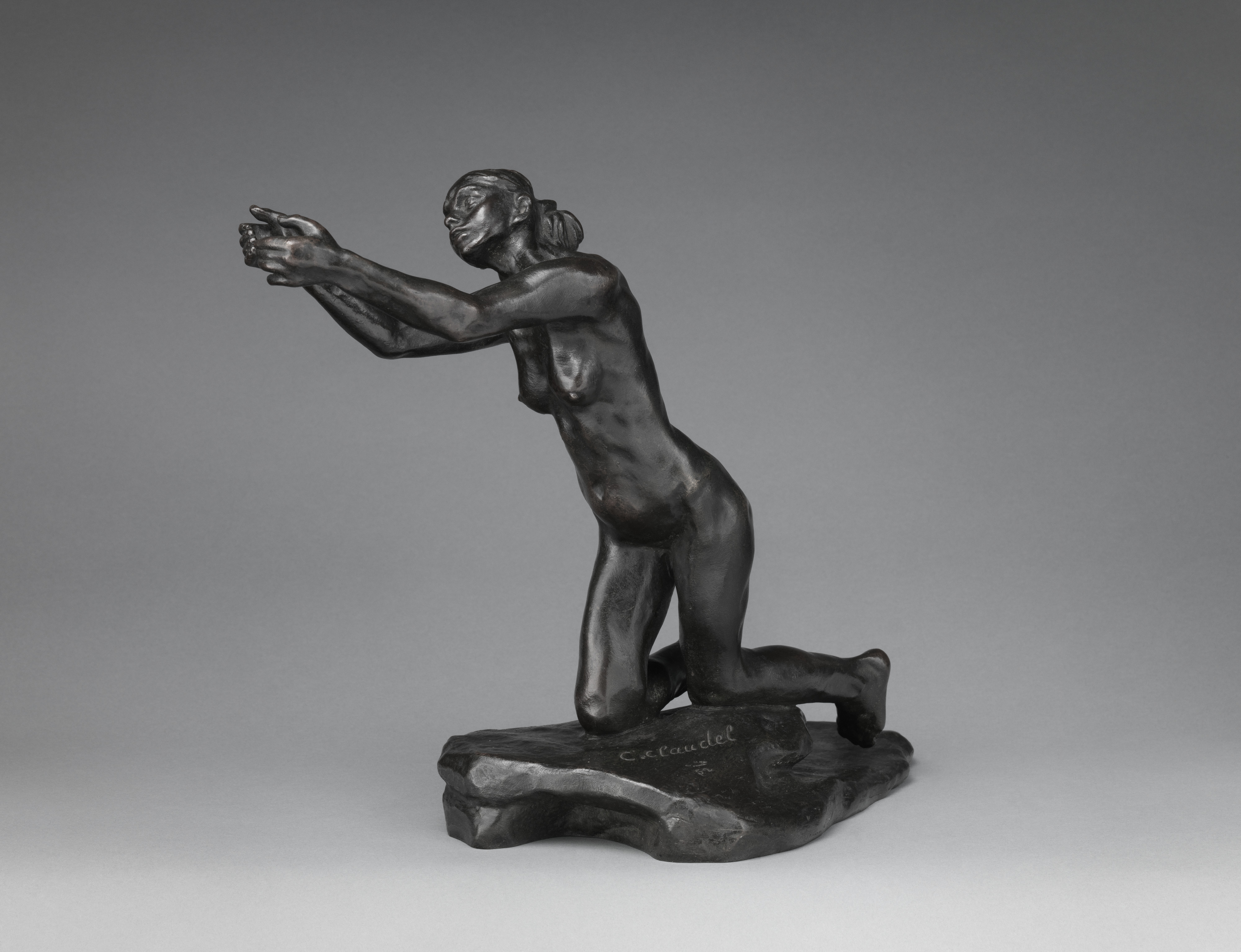
The Implorer ("l'Implorante"), small bronze cast for Eugène Blot, at the Metropolitan Museum of Art

== See also ==
- List of sculptures by Camille Claudel
- Musée Camille Claudel
