= Jean Joire =

French sculptor

- Born: 5 September 1862; Lille, France
- Died: 8 September 1950 (aged 88); Lomme, Lille, France
- Occupation: Sculptor

Jean Victor François Joseph Joire (5 September 1862 – 8 September 1950) was a French animalier sculptor.

== Biography ==
Joire was born into a family of bankers in Lille, where from 1875 to 1880 he attended the Écoles académiques. He worked at first in banking before becoming a full-time sculptor. From 1891 he was a regular contributor to the Salon des artistes français in Paris, mostly exhibiting animal pieces, particularly of horses and shepherd dogs, and became a member of it in 1906.

He opened a school of sculpture in Lille in collaboration with the sculptor Giacomo Merculiano (1859–1935). His studio records were apparently destroyed and few traces remain of his history and his work in the archives of his family. Until 1914 he used to spend the summers at the family's Château Joire (the present Maison des Enfants) at Lomme, a commune attached to Lille since 2000. In the château's park, certain of his works were visible from the street until their destruction during World War I.

His work was part of the sculpture event in the art competition at the 1928 Summer Olympics.

== Works in public collections ==
A selective list:

- Lille :
  - Garrison Officers' Mess, Rue du Pont Neuf: En Vedette, 1912 or 1913, equestrian statue in bronze
  - Palais des Beaux-Arts, Lille: "Tom", Belgian Shepherd, 1905, bronze
- Roubaix, La Piscine Museum: Bulldog's head, 1927, bronze
Works by Jean Joire

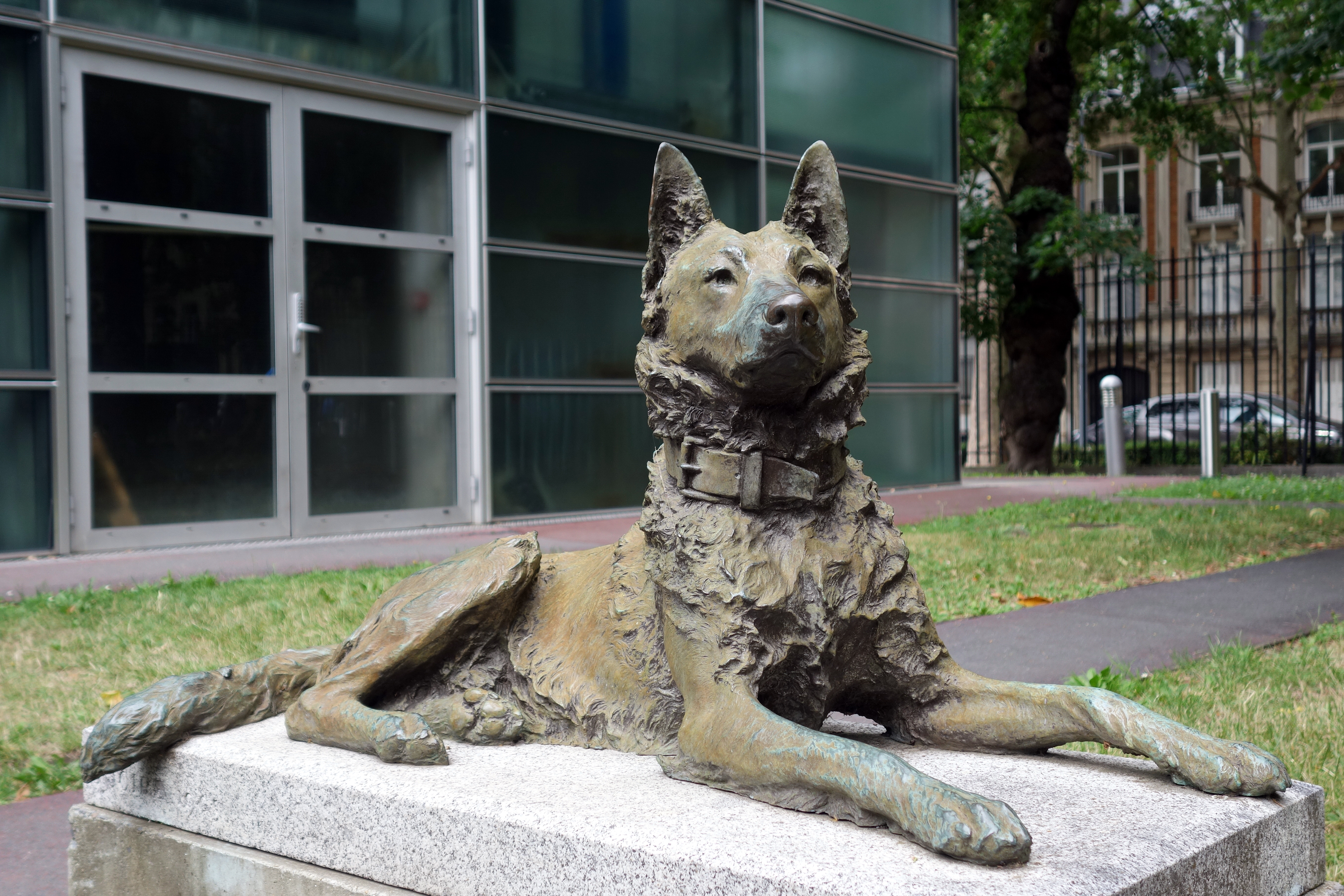
Tom, Belgian Shepherd, 1905, bronze

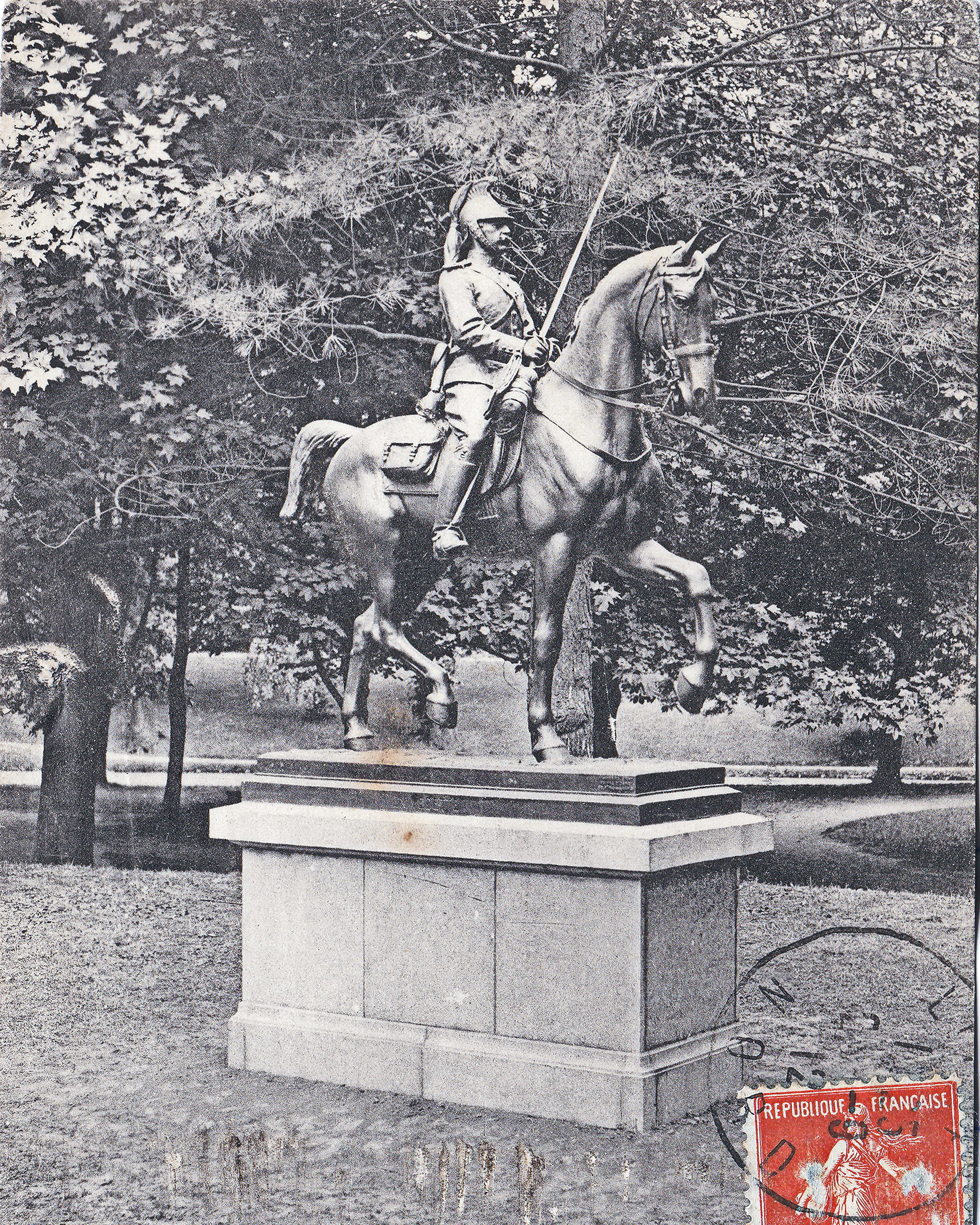
En Vedette, 1912 or 1913, equestrian statue in bronze
