= Avarice and Lust =

Sculpture by Auguste Rodin

- French: La luxure et l'avarice
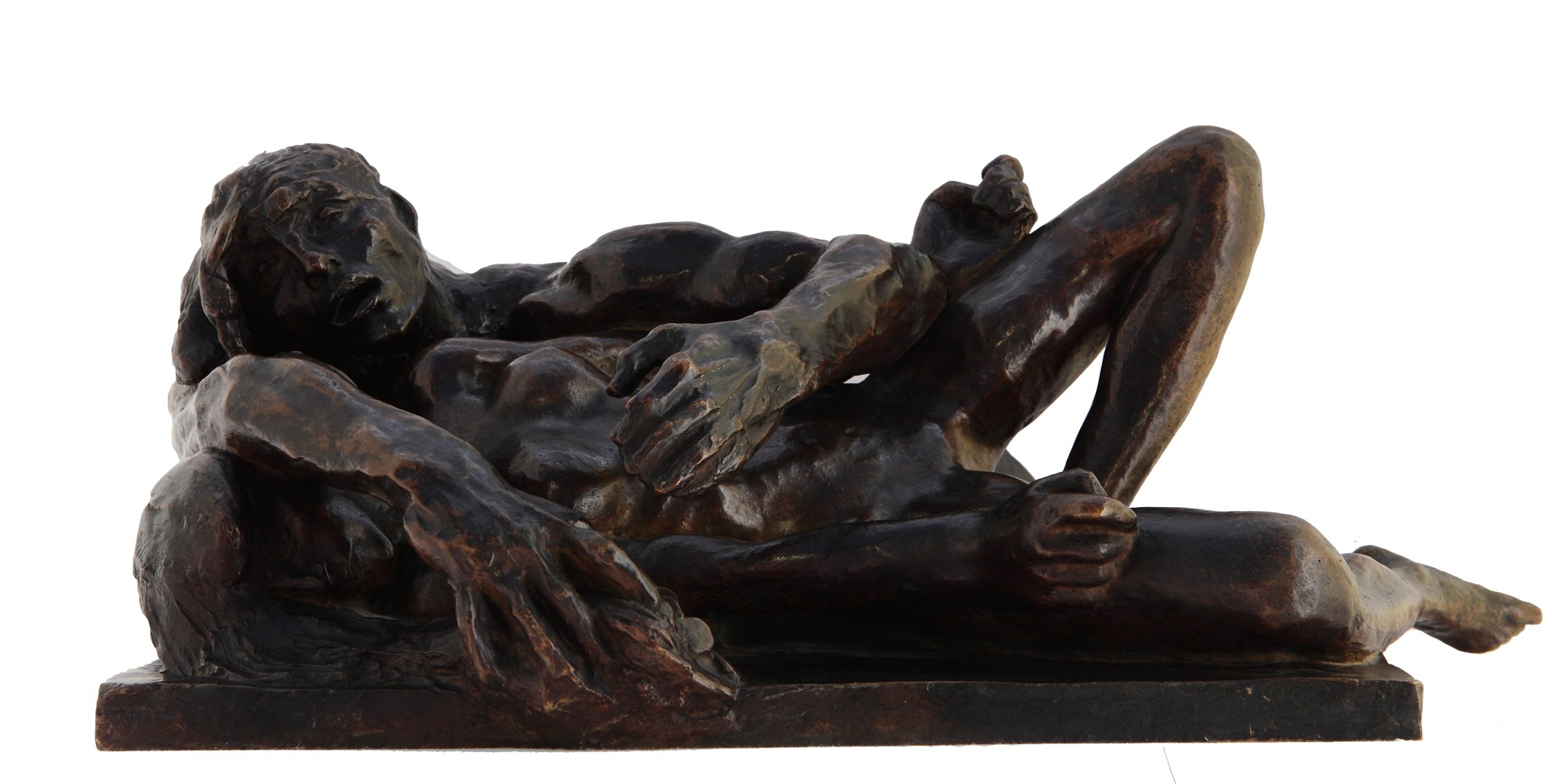
- Artist: Auguste Rodin
- Year: 1885
- Type: sculpture
- Medium: Bronze
- Location: Museo Nacional de Bellas Artes, Buenos Aires

Avarice and Lust is a sculpture by French artist Auguste Rodin, conceived between 1885 and 1887, representing two of the seven capital sins and is part of his sculptural group The Gates of Hell, where it can be found in the lower part of the right door. It's possible that the name was inspired by Victor Hugo's poem Après une lecture du Dante:

Et la luxure immonde, et l'avarice infâme,
Tous les manteaux de plomb dont peut se charger l'âme!

—Victor Hugo, from Les Voix intérieures
Translation:

And filthy lust, and shameful greed:
Leaden cloaks, all, that weigh down the soul!

—James Johnson

== Description ==
The piece is made of several parts: the torso of a falling man, whose extremely long arms encircle a woman who is partially covering her face, while he is reaching for some coins. He represents greed. His body is made up with the torso from The Falling Man, with the arms in a different position, a new head and hair. Lust is represented with the female figure offering her body, based on an 1888 drawing by Rodin, titled Skeleton embracing a woman.

== See also ==
- List of sculptures by Auguste Rodin
