= Bust of Auguste Rodin (Claudel) =

Sculpture by Camille Claudel

- Bronze cast of the bust at the Museo Soumaya
- Artist: Camille Claudel
- Year: 1888–1889

The Bust of Auguste Rodin was sculpted by the French artist Camille Claudel in 1888-1889 as a tribute to her teacher and lover, Auguste Rodin.

== Casts ==
A bronze cast of the work was displayed in the 1892 Salon de la Société Nationale des Beaux–Arts on the Champ de Mars to critical acclaim.

== See also ==
- List of sculptures by Camille Claudel
- Bust of Auguste Rodin (Bourdelle)
