= Musée Camille Claudel =

Art museum in Nogent-sur-Seine, France

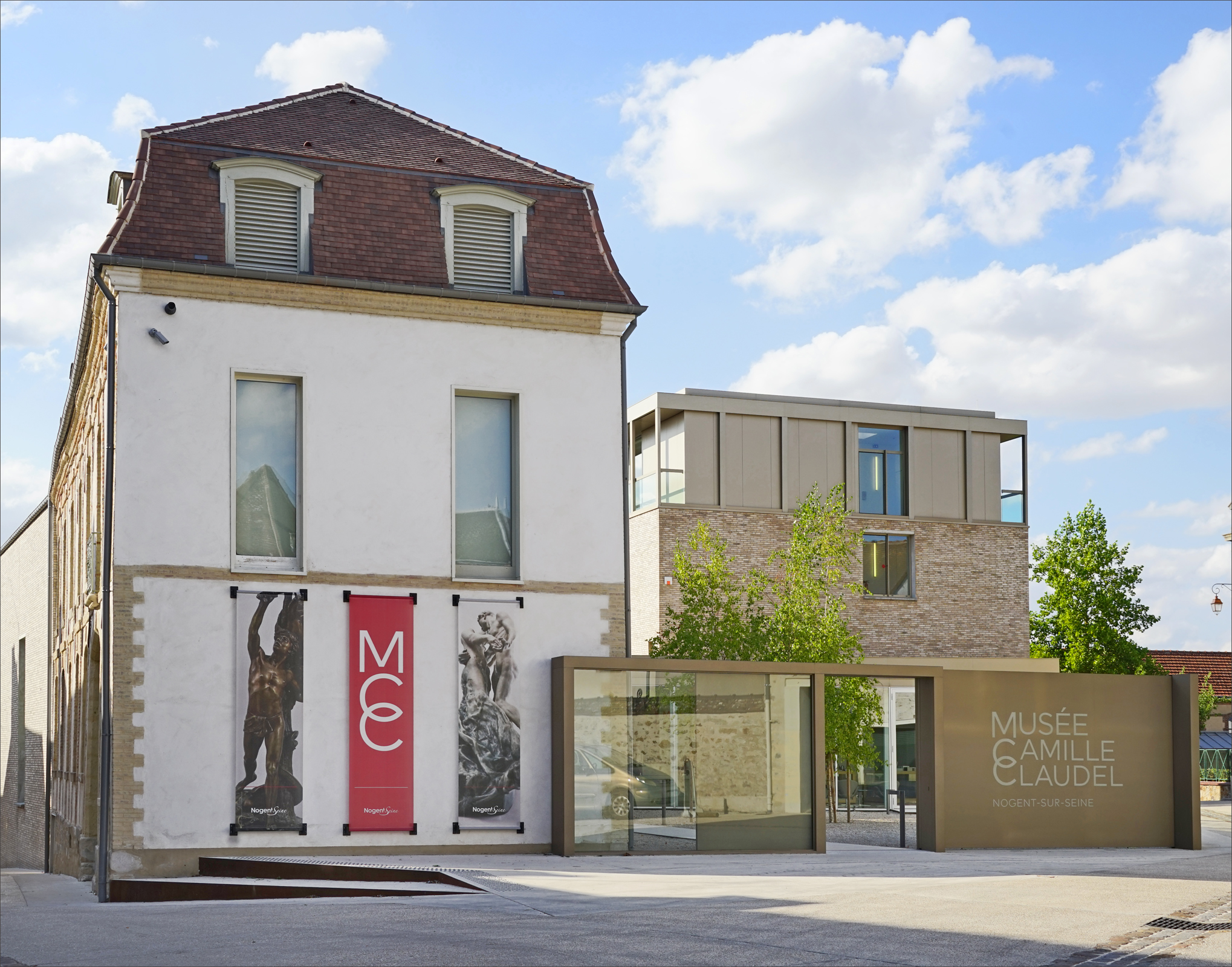
- Interactive fullscreen map
- Established: 2017; 9 years ago
- Location: 10 Rue Gustave-Flaubert, 10400 Nogent-sur-Seine, Champagne, France
- Type: Art museum
- Collections: Sculpture
- Collection size: 300 objects
- Architect: Adelfo Scaranello
- Website: museecamilleclaudel.com

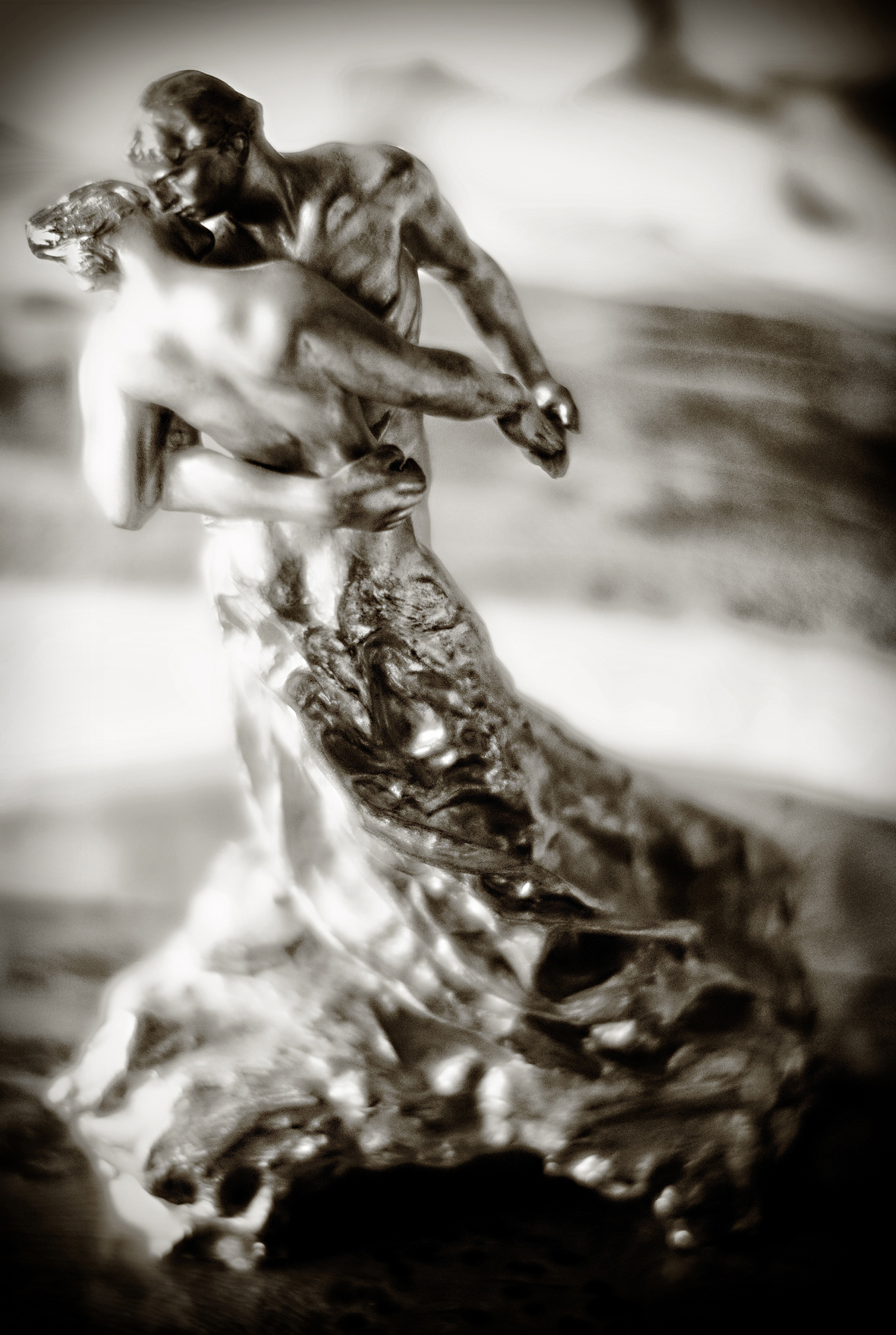
The museum exhibits several forms of Claudel's The Waltz, 1889–1905

The Musée Camille Claudel (French pronunciation: [myze kamij klodɛl]; English: Camille Claudel Museum) is a French national museum which honors and exhibits the art of sculptor Camille Claudel. The museum displays approximately half of Claudel's existing artwork. The Claudel museum was opened in 2017 in her teenage home town of Nogent-sur-Seine, 100 kilometers (62 miles) southeast of Paris.

Plans were announced in 2003 to turn the Claudel family home at Nogent-sur-Seine into a museum, and the museum negotiated to buy Claudel's works from the Claudel family. These include 70 pieces by Claudel, including a bust of her teacher, Auguste Rodin. Rodin and Claudel were associates and lovers, and eventually rivals.

Many of Claudel's sculptures can also be seen at the Musée Rodin in Paris, which has a room dedicated to her work.

== History ==
A municipal museum was created in the town of Nogent-sur-Seine in 1902. It held a collection of works by the sculptors Alfred Boucher and Paul Dubois, both of whom had a connection to the community.

The early museum was decimated by pillagers around 1940 during World War II. Remaining works were placed in storage in 1950, as France continued its post-war recovery. The Musée Dubois-Boucher reopened in 1975.

In 2008, the museum purchased 43 works by Claudel from the artist’s great niece, Reine Marie Paris. Architect Adelfo Scaranello designed an expansion and renovation of an existing structure, where Claudel had lived during her teenage years, into a new facility to include 15 galleries.

Reopened in 2017 as the Musée Camille Claudel, it now houses the largest collection of her works in the world. The museum also displays works by her mentors and contemporaries.

== See also ==
- List of sculptures by Camille Claudel
- List of national museums
- List of museums in France
- List of single-artist museums
