= Henry Roujon =

French writer

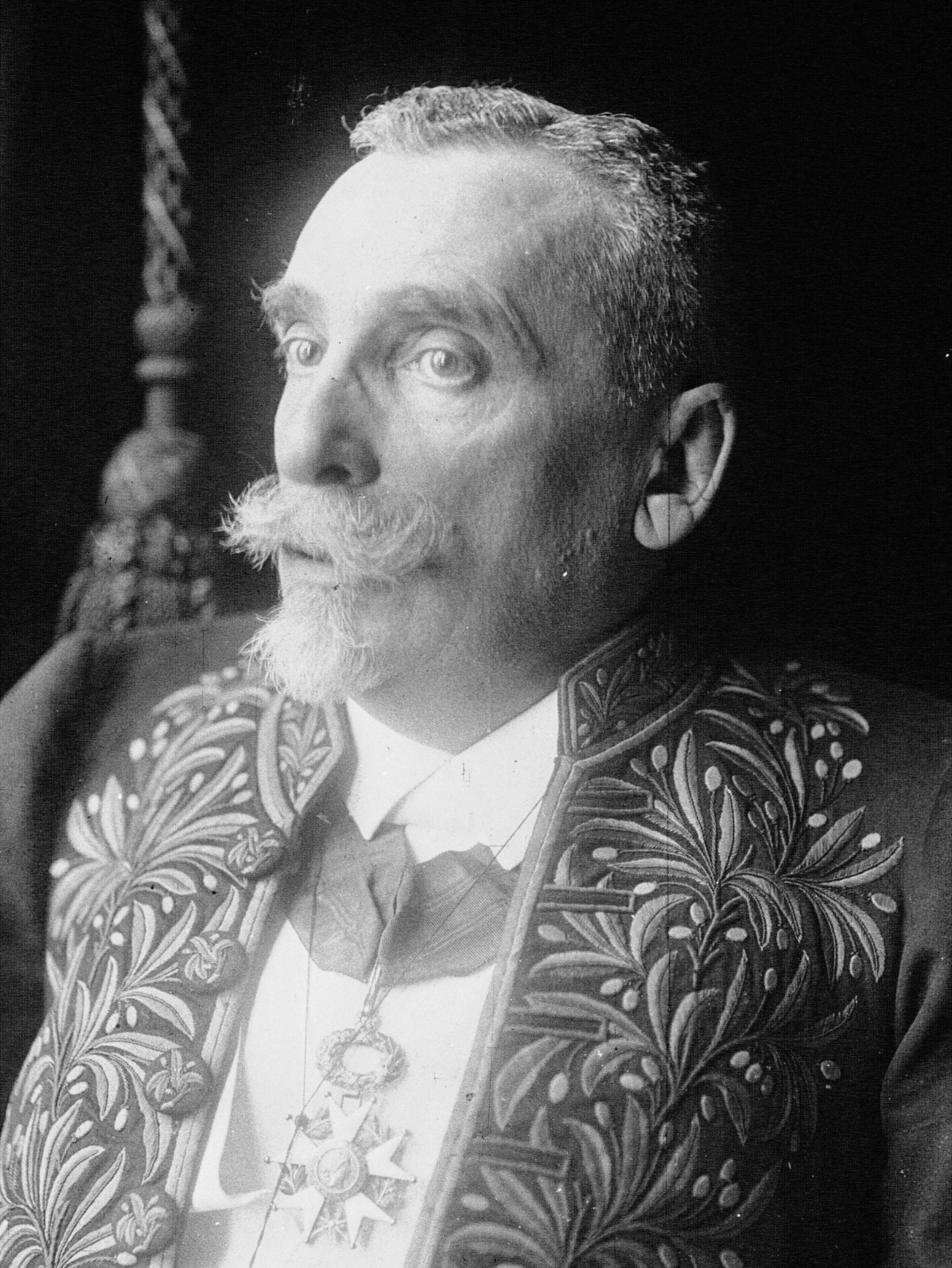
Henry Roujon (1912)

Henry Roujon (French pronunciation: [ɑ̃ʁi ʁuʒɔ̃]; 1 September 1853, Paris – 1 June 1914, Paris) was a French academic, essayist and novelist.

Roujon was the secretary of Jules Ferry, and became director of Fine Arts in 1894. Later he was named secretary for life of the Académie des Beaux-Arts in 1903 and was an elected member of the Académie française in 1911.

Guy de Maupassant dedicated his story Pierrot to Roujon.

== Work ==
- Miss (1885)
- Le Docteur Modesto (1886)
- Miremonde (1887)
- Le Voyage en Italie de M. de Vandières et de sa compagnie (1749-1751) (1900)
- Au milieu des hommes (1906)
- Les grandes institutions de France : l'Institut de France (2 volumes, 1907)
- La Galerie des bustes (1908)
- Dames d'autrefois (1911)
- En marge du temps (Recueil de chroniques parues dans le journal Le Temps, 1928)
