= La Piscine Museum =

Museum in Roubaix, France

Coordinates: 50.692577°N 3.167560°E

La Piscine
- Musée d'art et d'industrie André-Diligent
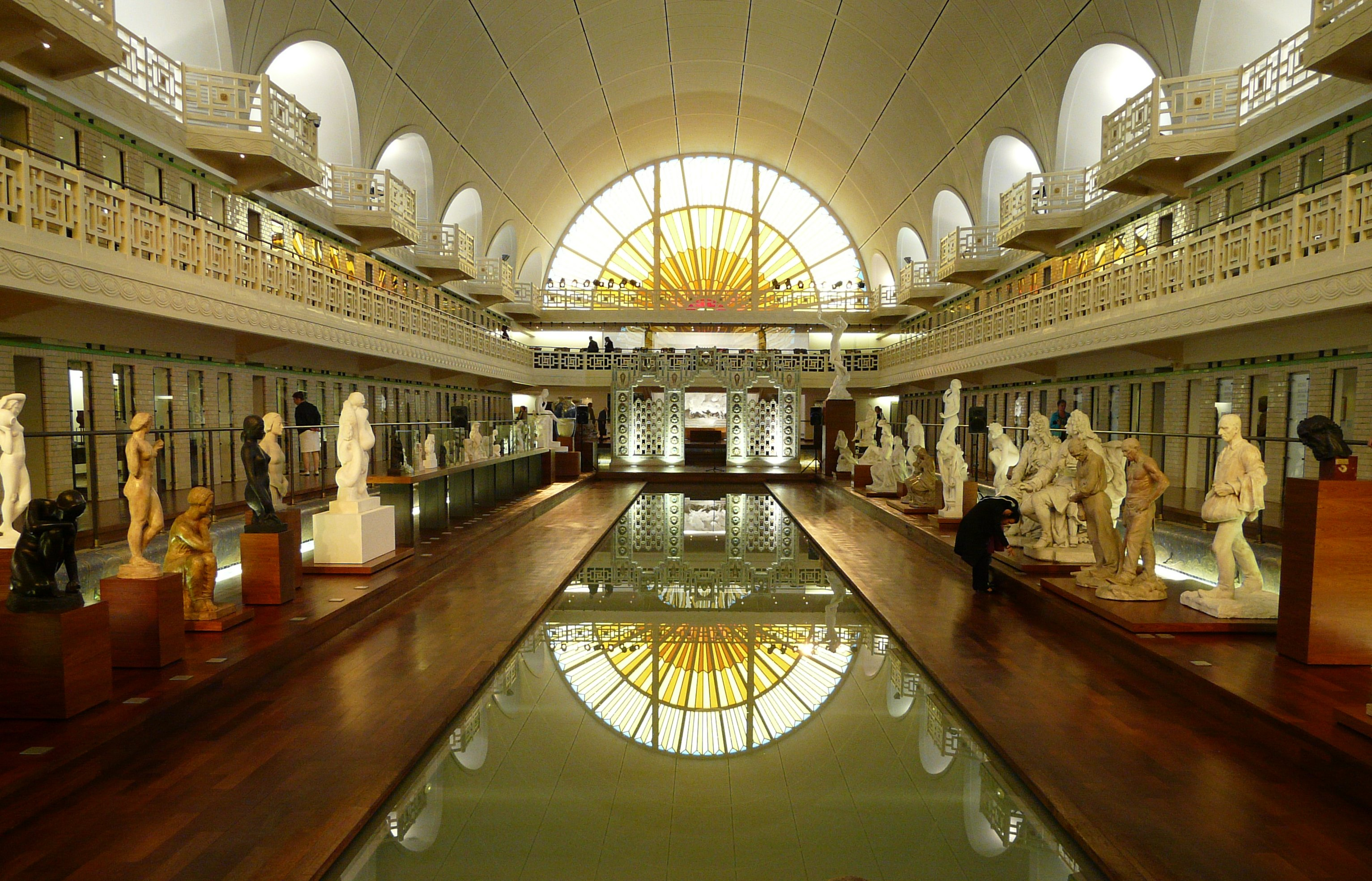
- Established: 2000
- Location: 23 rue de l'Espérance; Roubaix, France
- Type: Art and industry
- Collections: Textiles, fashion, ceramics, ethnographic collections related to the textile industry, fine arts
- Visitors: 206,120 (2011)
- Director: Bruno Gaudichon

La Piscine (French for "the swimming pool") is a museum of art and industry, located in the city of Roubaix in northern France. It is more formally known as La Piscine-Musée d'Art et d'Industrie André Diligent or Le musée d'Art et d'Industrie de la ville de Roubaix, but its common name derives from the fact that it is housed in a former indoor swimming pool, with a notable art deco interior.

== History ==
The swimming pool was constructed between 1927 and 1932, by the Lille architect Albert Baert. It closed as a swimming pool in 1985, and was remodelled as a museum by the architect Jean-Paul Philippon, opening in 2000. A modern entrance building, special exhibition space and garden were constructed within the roof-less shell of an adjoining textile factory.

The museum's permanent collection has its origins in 1835, when a collection of fabric samples from the many local textile factories was started. By 1898 the collection was housed in the National High School of Arts and Textile Industry (ENSAIT), and was seen as a way of cultivating the tastes of the town's workers, foremen and manufacturers. To this end the collection combined elements of literature, fine-arts, science and industrial products. The ENSAIT museum closed with the onset of World War II, and never reopened. From 1990 the collections were displayed in Roubaix's town hall, in preparation for the opening of La Piscine in 2000.

La Piscine was reopened in 2018 after two-year restoration, that cost nine million euro.

Museum entrance

The Stained-Glass Window of the Setting Sun

The large pool surrounded by statues

The indoor garden

Central Gallery
