= Suzon =

Suzon may refer to:

- Suzon (sculpture)
- Suzon (river)

== See also ==
- Val-Suzon, commune in France
- Suzon de Terson, 17th-century French poet
- Suzon Fuks, artist
- Susan
