= I Am Beautiful (Rodin) =

Sculpture by Auguste Rodin

- Je suis belle (French)
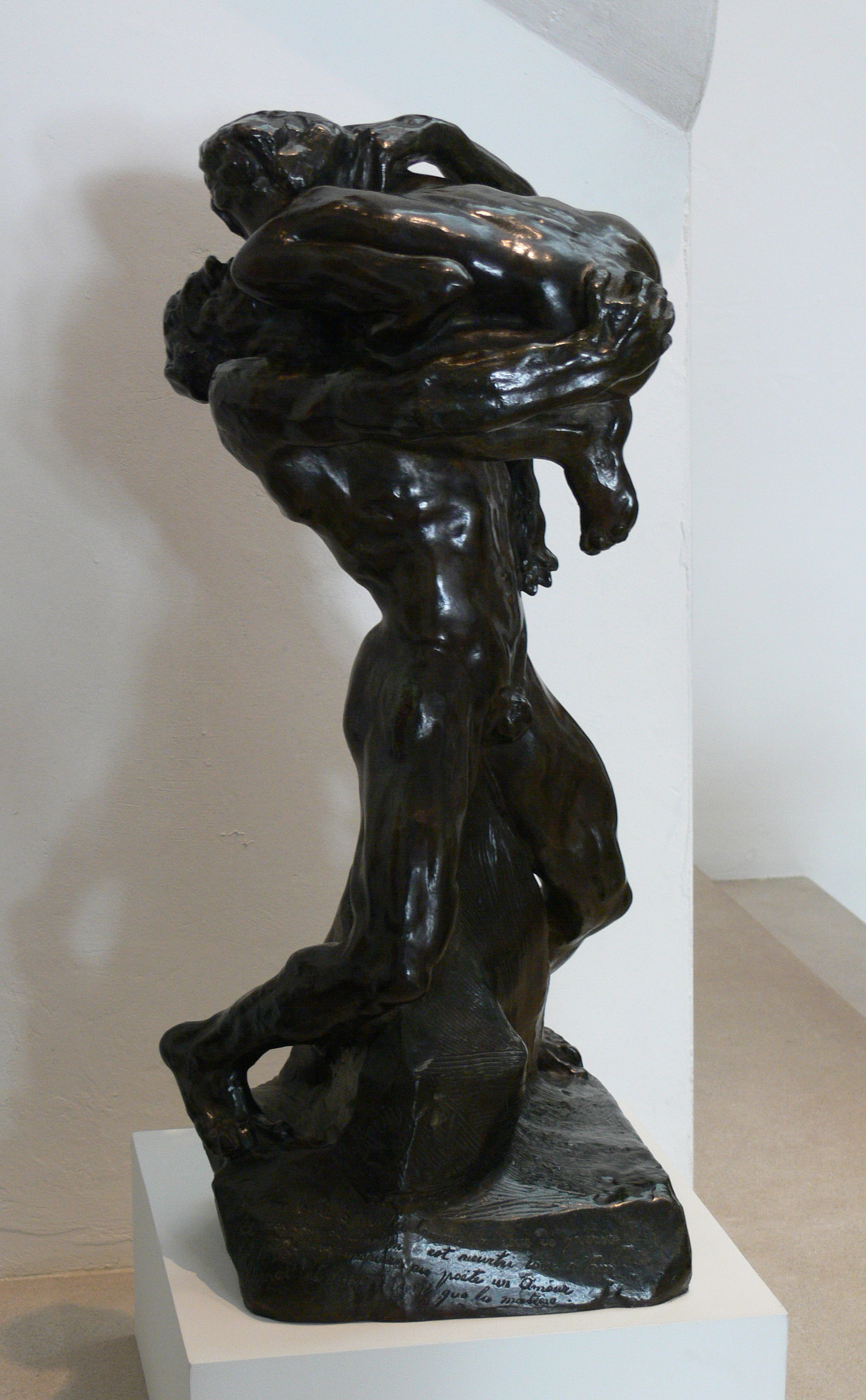
- Artist: Auguste Rodin
- Year: 1882
- Type: Sculpture
- Medium: Bronze
- Dimensions: 69.4 cm × 36 cm × 36 cm (27.3 in × 14.1 in × 14.1 in)
- Location: Dallas Museum of Art, Texas

I Am Beautiful, also known as The Abduction, is a sculpture of 1882 by the French artist Auguste Rodin, inspired in a fragment from Charles Baudelaire's collection of poems Les Fleurs du mal.

== Gates of Hell ==
The sculpture appears in the Gates of Hell, specifically in the right pilaster, made from joining Crouching Woman and The Falling Man. This group shows the woman with her back to the audience, in a round-like shape, and the man holding her in a manner reminiscent of the mythological deity Atlas. In this and several other pieces, Rodin wants to express a morbid and erotic vision in which sexual satisfaction is unreachable.

== Exhibition ==
I Am Beautiful was part of an exhibition at the Georges Petit Gallery in 1886, where it caused commotion due to its audacity: the union of the aforementioned pieces forms a symbolic expression of joy and passion that could not be achieved by its component parts, showcasing both suffering—in a figure that folds unto itself—and an excess of reach in an overextended figure.

== See also ==
- List of sculptures by Auguste Rodin
