= Young Mother =

Sculpture by Auguste Rodin

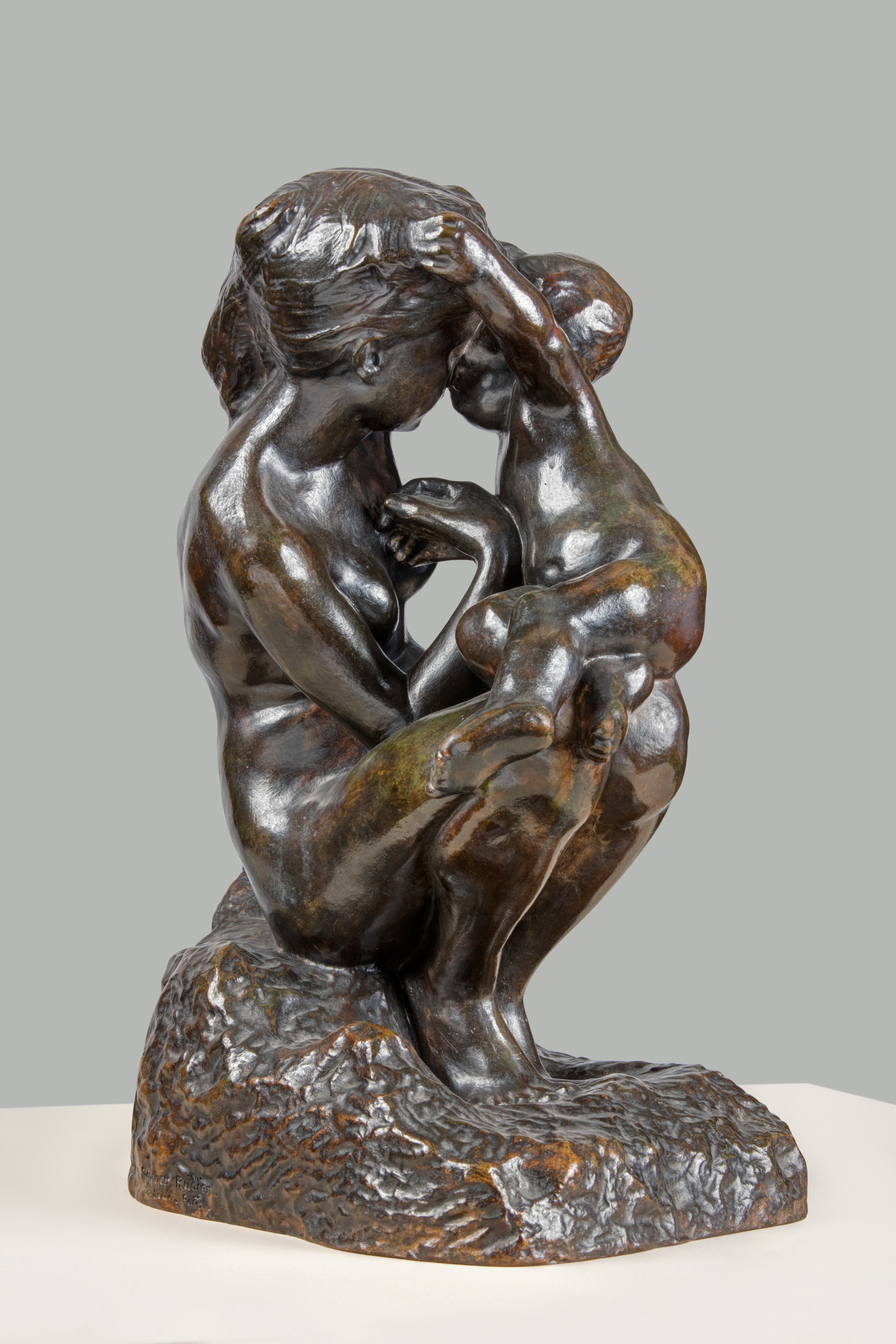
- at Museo Soumaya
- Artist: Auguste Rodin
- Year: 1885
- Medium: Bronze

Young Mother is a bronze sculpture by Auguste Rodin with a brown and green patina, conceived in 1885 and cast by the Rudier Foundry.

== Casts ==
A first edition cast is now in the Museo Soumaya. Other versions of the work survive in marble in the National Gallery of Scotland and in plaster in the Academy of the Legion of Honour in San Francisco.

It shows a young woman sitting on a rock and resting a child on her knee. It was shown on the lower half of The Gates of Hell and may have been a forerunner of Young Mother in the Grotto.

== See also ==
- List of sculptures by Auguste Rodin
