= The Sirens (sculpture) =

Sculpture by Auguste Rodin

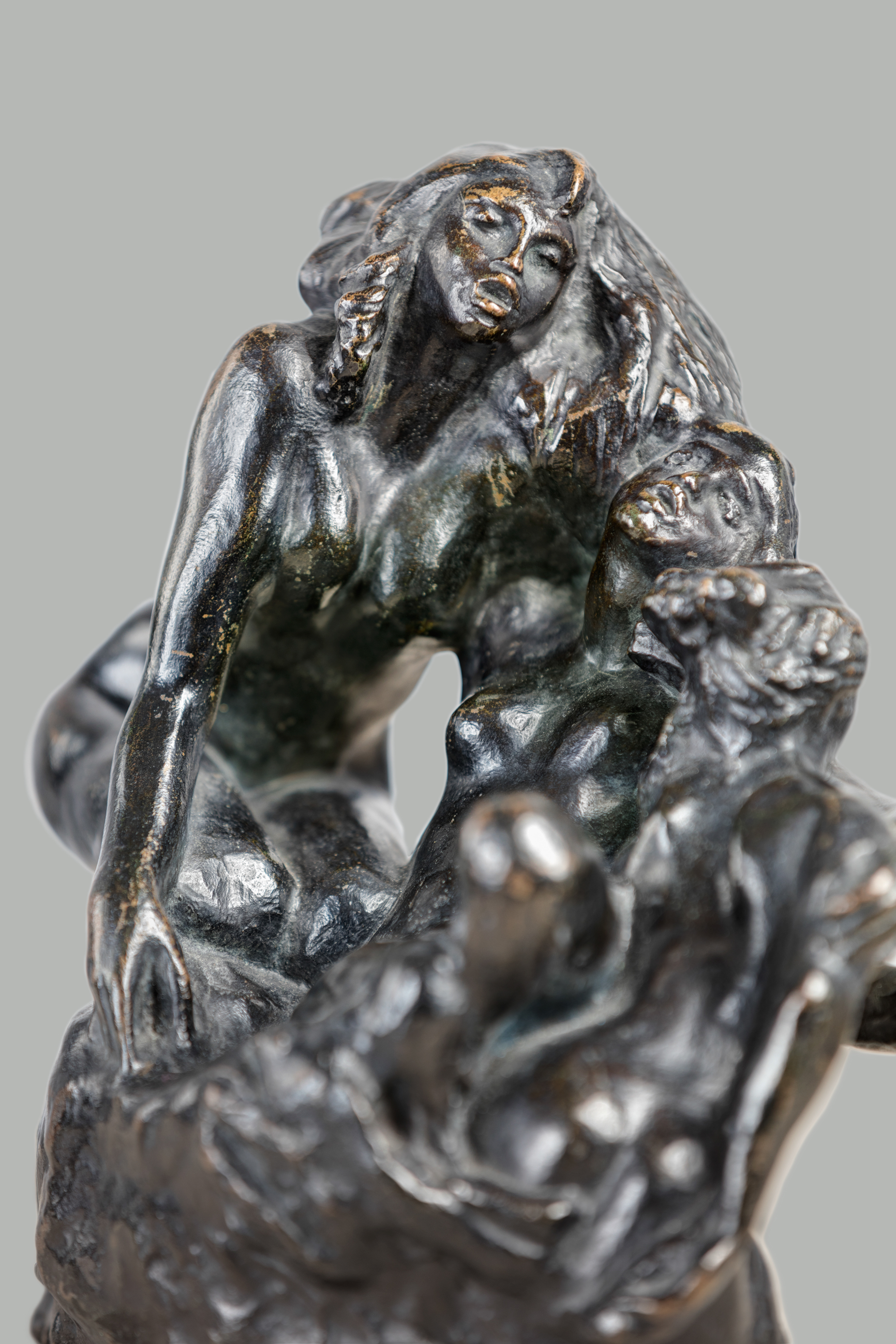
- Artist: Auguste Rodin
- Year: 1887

The Sirens, The Sirens' Song or Nereids is an 1887 bronze sculpture with a brown patina. It was created by Auguste Rodin and cast by the Rudier Foundry.

== Use ==
He also used the figure on the top left of The Gates of Hell and it also formed the inspiration for his The Poet's Death and his work on the Vittorio Emmanuele II Monument. The work is alluded to in Victor Hugo's play Cromwell, when Rochester remarks to Francisca "My queen, my goddess, my nymph, my siren!".

== See also ==
- List of sculptures by Auguste Rodin
