= The Prayer (sculpture) =

Sculpture of Auguste Rodin

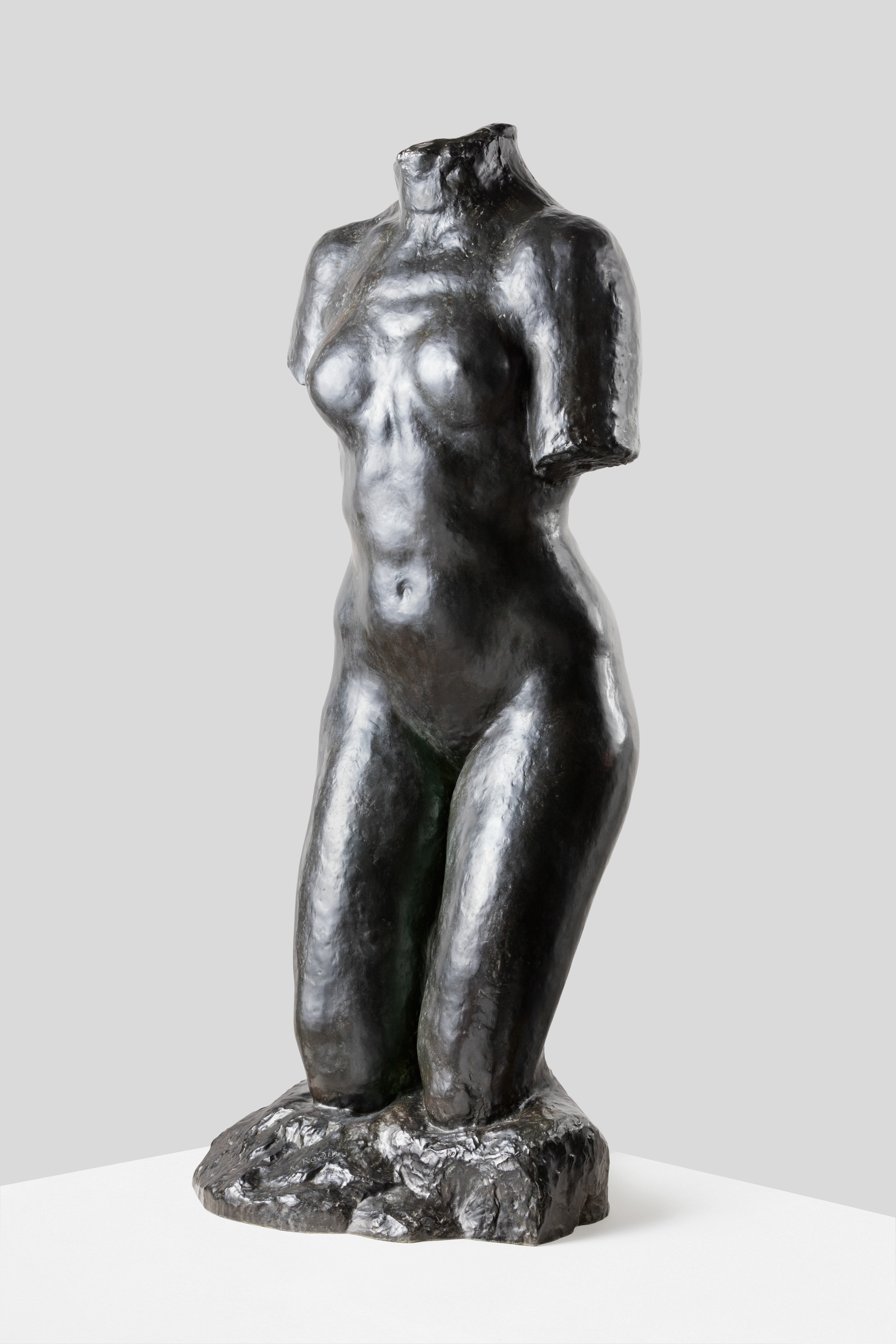
- Cast of the work in the Museo Soumaya in Mexico City
- Artist: Auguste Rodin
- Year: 1909
- Medium: Brown-patina bronze

The Prayer (La prière) is a 1909 sculpture by Auguste Rodin. As in his The Walking Man, he explores a fragment of a figure.

== Casts ==
One of the bronze casts of the work is now in the Museo Soumaya in Mexico City.

== See also ==
- List of sculptures by Auguste Rodin
