= The Athlete (Rodin) =

Sculpture by Auguste Rodin

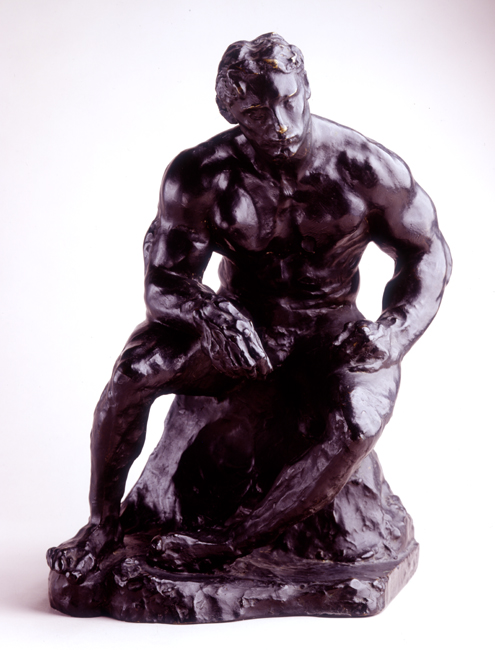
- Artist: Auguste Rodin
- Year: 1901 to 1904

The Athlete is a 1901-1904 black-patina bronze sculpture by the French artist Auguste Rodin It measures 39,4 × 27,5 × 24,3 cm.

== Development ==
The model for it was Samuel Stockton White III, a member of the gymnastics teams at Princeton University and the University of Cambridge. White recalled:

...he made me come and go from his studio so as to see me from different angles. Finally he asked me to adopt a natural posture and to place myself as I liked. I sat on a chair, in the most simple and natural position, resting my arms on my legs ... Rodin liked that position and immediately began to work ... with an infinite sense of detail

== Similar works ==
During the same period Rodin also produced The American Athlete, with more exaggerated musculature and its head turned to the right. He presented both works to their model. Despite several variants, they are both lesser-known works of Rodin.

Another version of this bronze called "The Athlete" (1901-4, cast 1959), with the head turned to the left, is preserved at The Kreeger Museum in Washington D.C. It measures 18 x 13 x 12 1/2 inches (45,7 x 33,0 x 31,7 cm).

== See also ==
- List of sculptures by Auguste Rodin
