= La Defense (sculpture) =

Sculpture by Auguste Rodin

- The Call to Arms
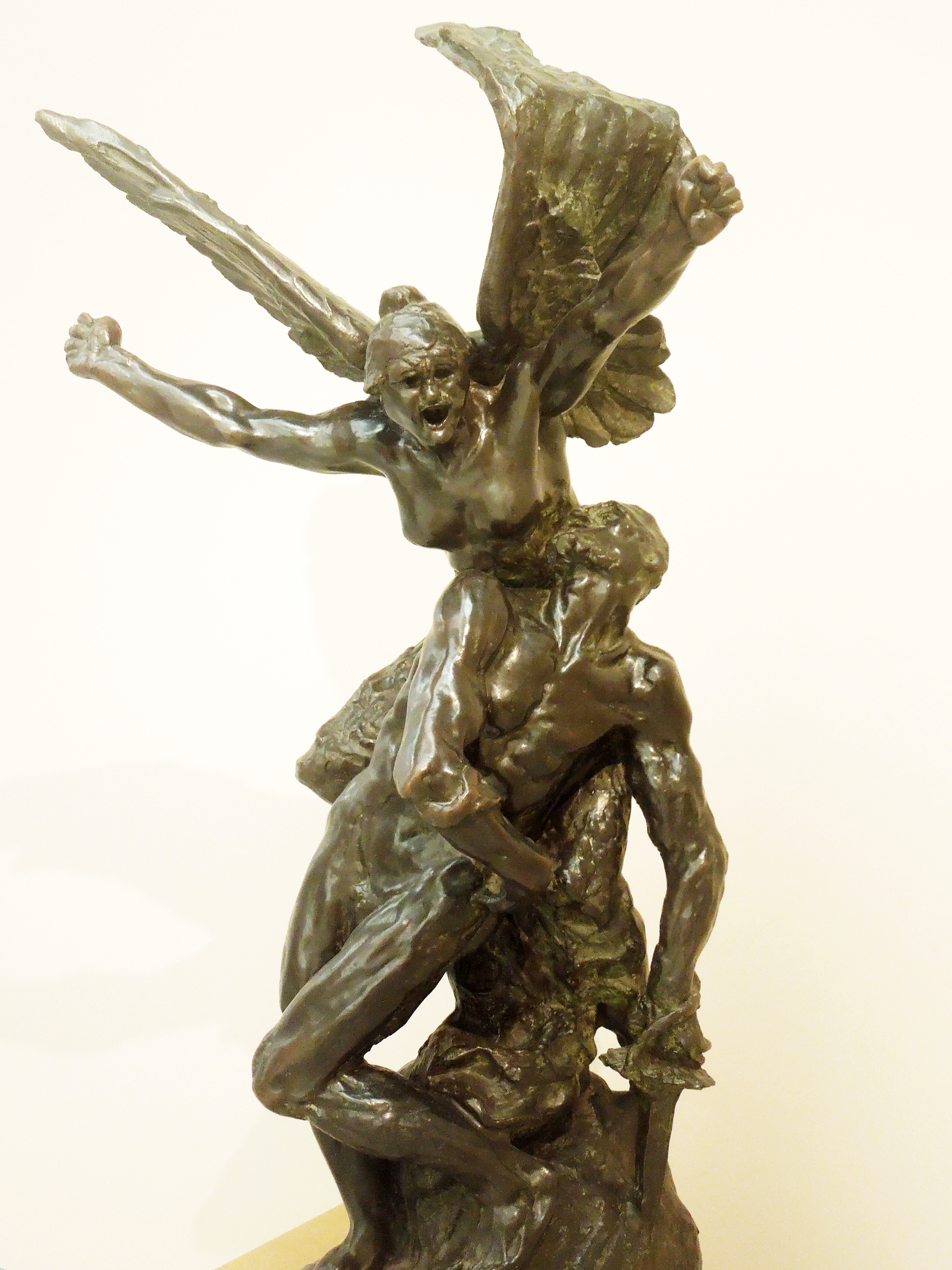
- Model of the sculpture cast in bronze
- Artist: Auguste Rodin
- Year: 1879
- Medium: Bronze
- Dimensions: 110 cm × 58 cm × 41 cm (44 in × 23 in × 16 in)
- Location: Portland Art Museum, United States
- Accession: 78.1

La Defense, also known as The Call to Arms, is a sculpture by Auguste Rodin.

== History ==
Rodin created a model for a competition for a monument to the siege of Paris in 1870 during the Franco-Prussian War. It was rejected in favor of a bronze sculpture by Louis-Ernest Barrias. Later, it was enlarged to four times its size to be used as a monument in Verdun.

== Description ==
The bronze sculpture in the Portland Art Museum's Evan H. Roberts Memorial Sculpture Collection was modeled in 1879 and cast c. 1910, and measures 44 in x 23 in x 16 inches.

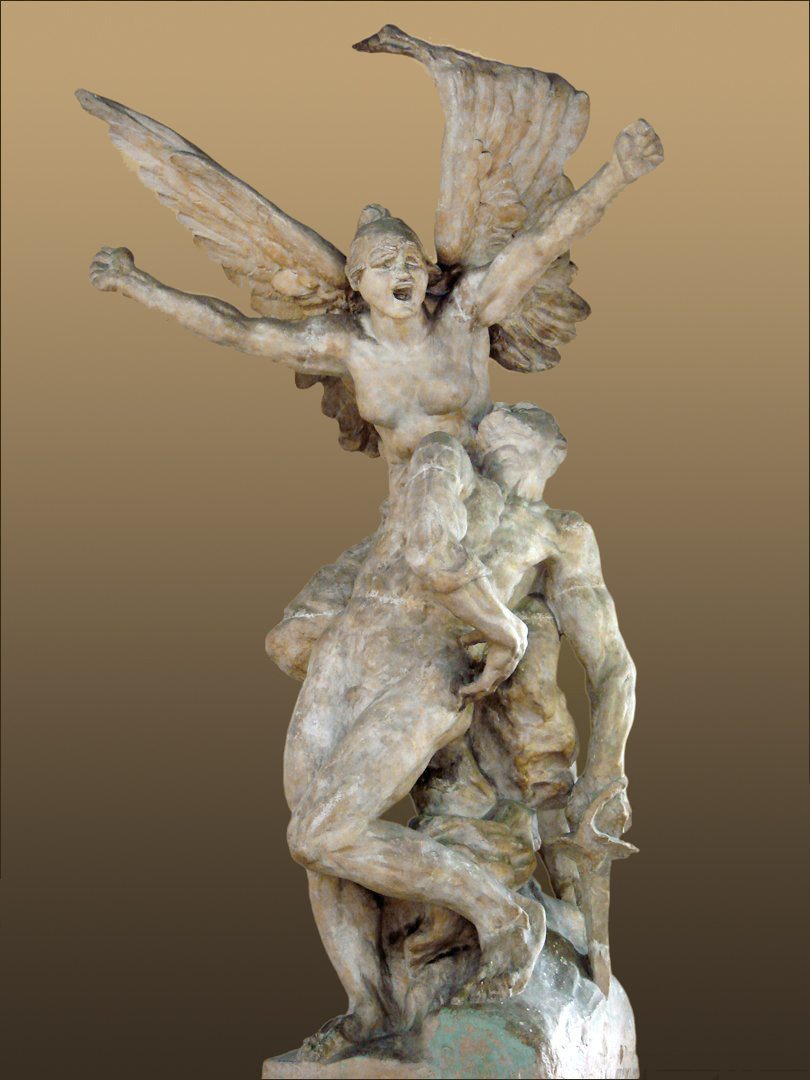
Response to the competition

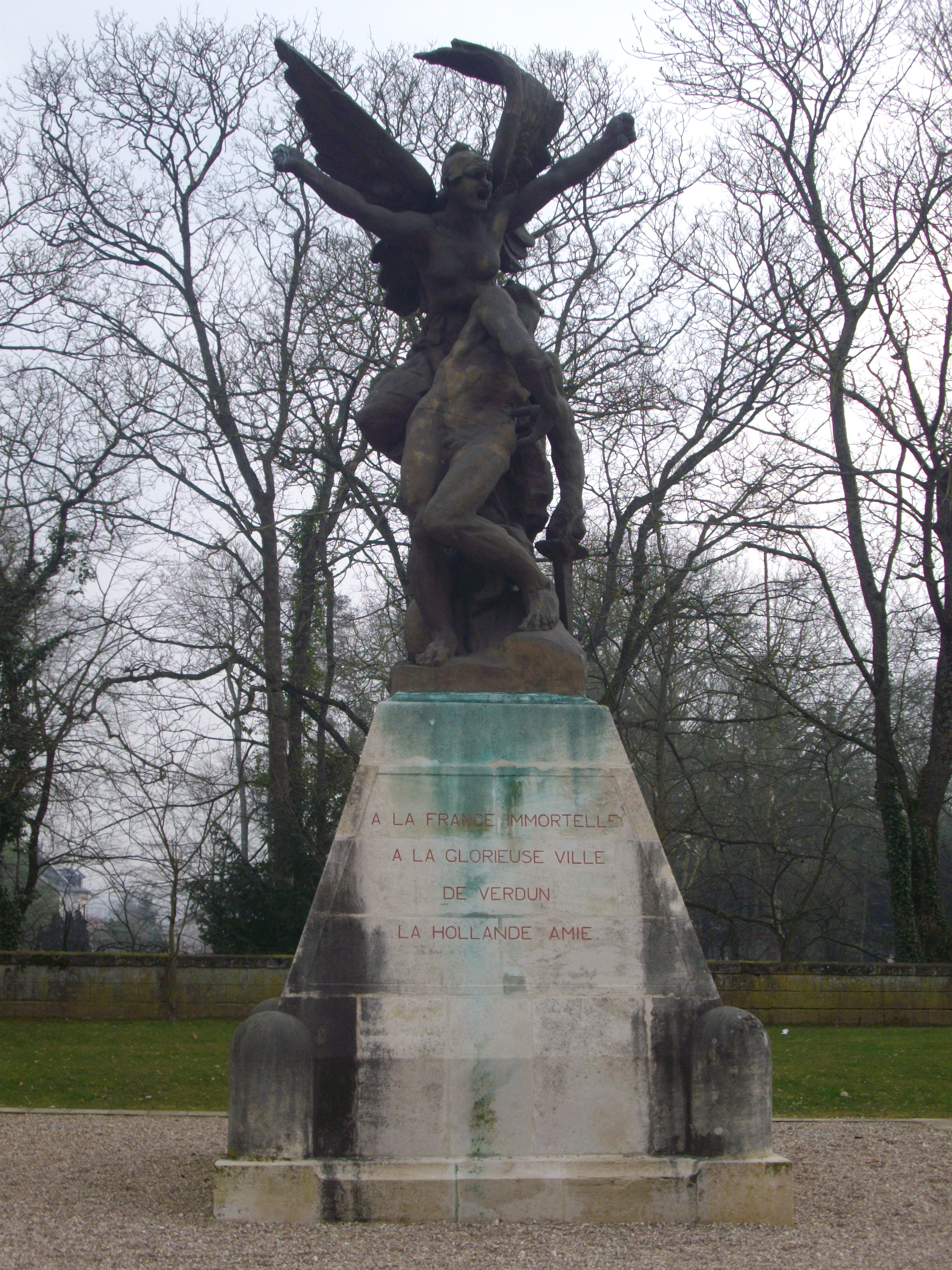
Monument in Verdun

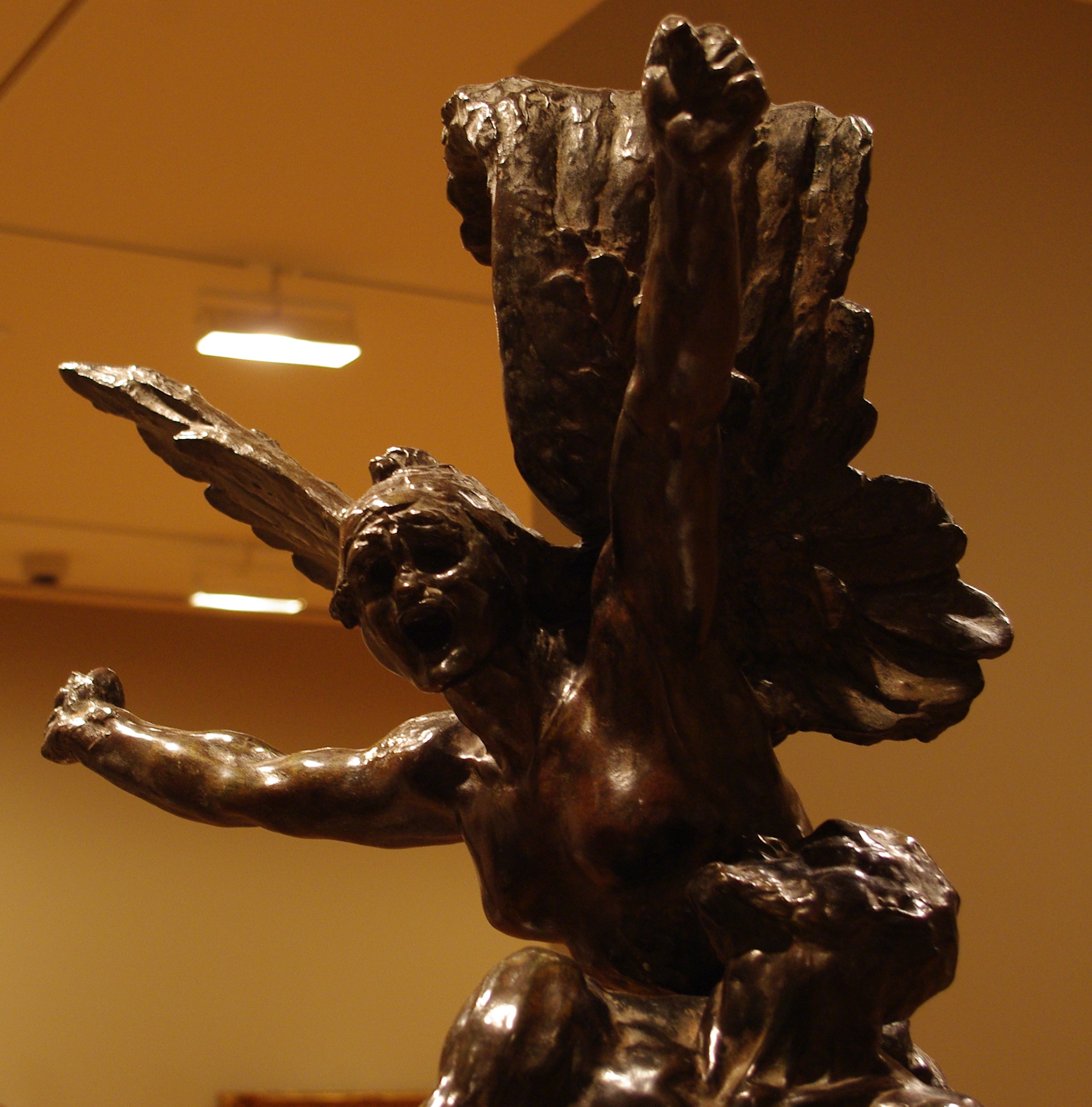
Sculpture at the Portland Art Museum

== See also ==
- List of sculptures by Auguste Rodin
