= Bust of Maurice Haquette =

Sculpture by Auguste Rodin

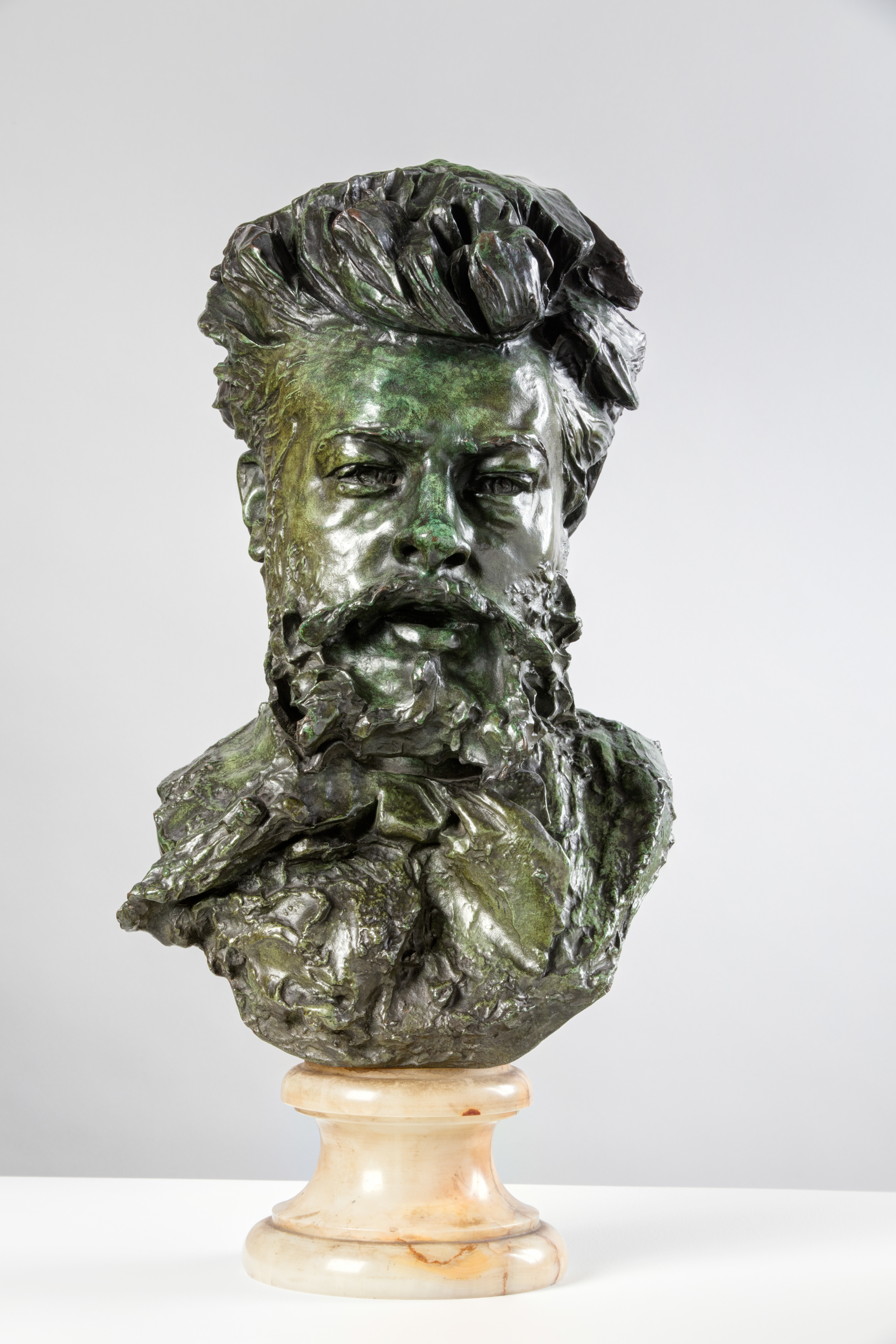
- at Museo Soumaya, Mexico City
- Artist: Auguste Rodin
- Year: 1883
- Medium: Bronze
- Location: Museo Soumaya, Mexico City

The Bust of Maurice Haquette is an 1883 bronze sculpture by the French artist Auguste Rodin, measuring 53.5 by 26.7 by 41.1 cm.

== Friendship ==
Haquette taught painting and watercolour at the Sèvres factory, where he became friends with Rodin. When Rodin exhibited The Age of Bronze at the Paris Salon of 1877, it was seen as so realistic that some accused him of moulding directly from the human body. Haquette defended Rodin against these allegations just after the latter's arrival in Brussels.

== Gates of hell ==
Around this time, France's Ministry of Public Education and Arts was planning to build a Museum of Decorative Arts in Paris on the remains of the Court of Accounts. Several artists were summoned to work on the project and Haquette introduced Rodin to his brother Georges Haquette, who in turn knew undersecretary Edmond Turquet. Turquet and Georges Haquette recommended Rodin for the project and commissioned him to produce The Gates of Hell. On the reverse is inscribed À mon ami Haquette (To my friend Haquette) - it is thought to have been cast as a thank-you gift for the Gates of Hell commission.

== See also ==
- List of sculptures by Auguste Rodin
