= The Cathedral (sculpture) =

Sculpture of Auguste Rodin

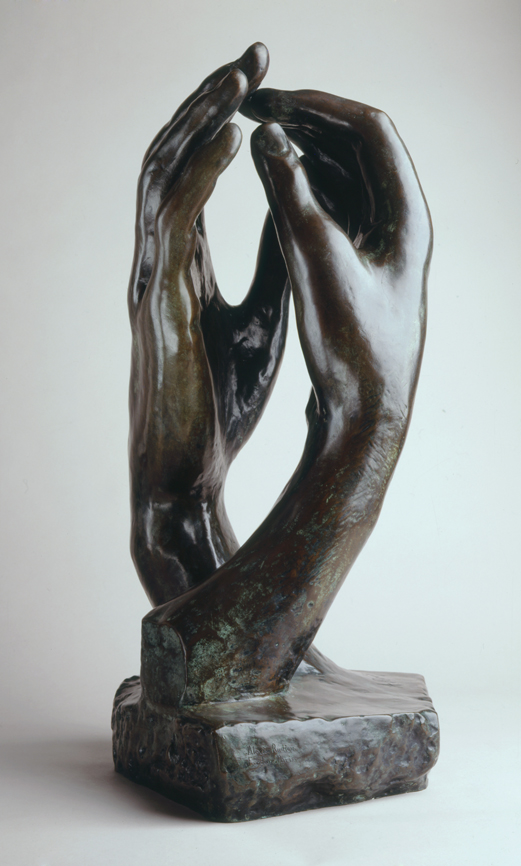
- at the Museo Soumaya in Mexico City
- Artist: Auguste Rodin
- Year: 1908
- Medium: Stone (original) / bronze casting

The Arc of the Covenant (Note: In reference to the harmony of communication represented by two humans' right hands.) or The Cathedral (Note: Renamed after the publication of Rodin's The Cathedrals of France in 1914.) is a sculpture by the French artist Auguste Rodin, conceived in 1908.

== Description ==
It shows two intertwined right hands belonging to two different figures.

== Versions ==
Originally carved in stone, it was later cast in various editions in bronze.

== See also ==
- List of sculptures by Auguste Rodin
