= Adonis Awakens =

Sculpture by Auguste Rodin

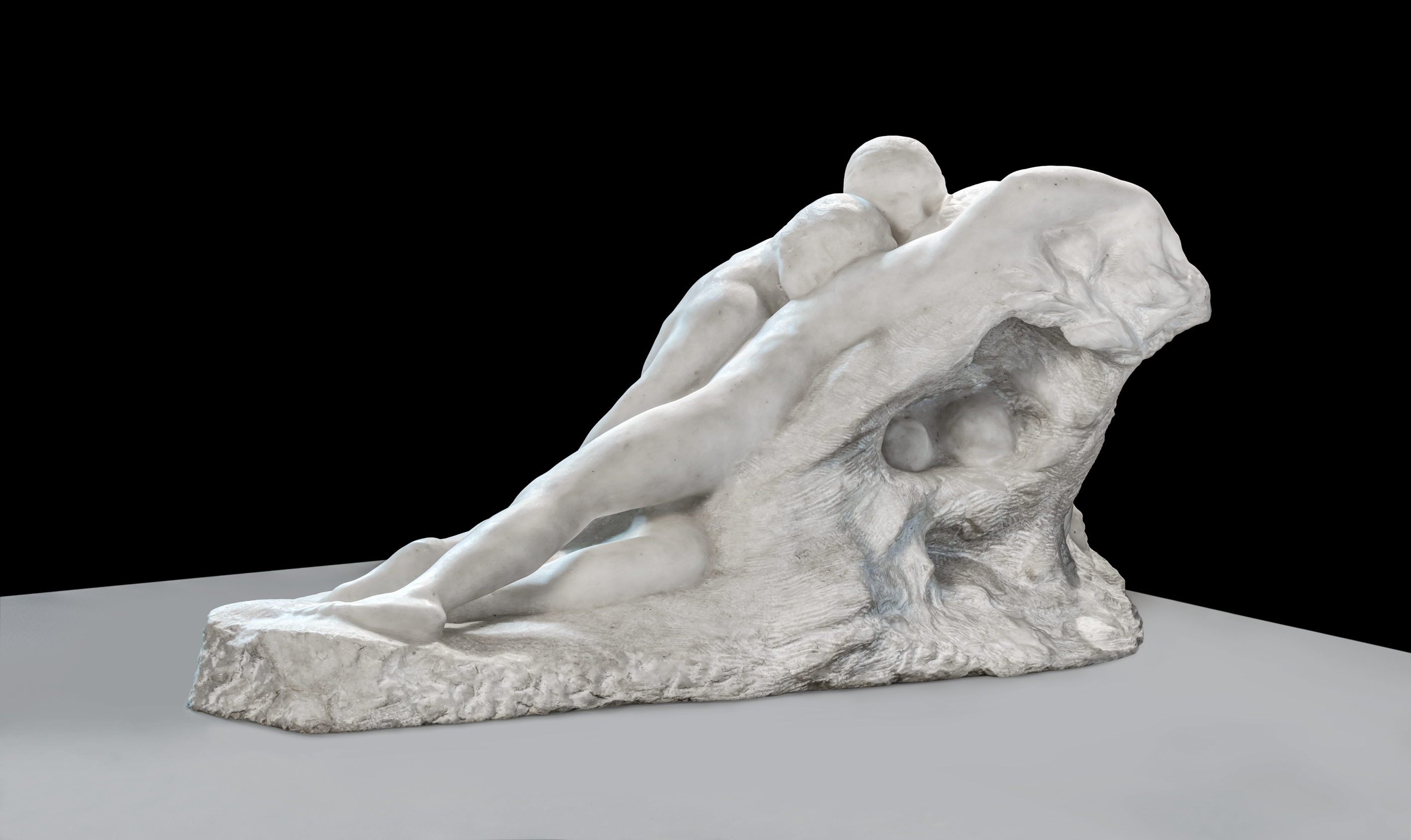
- Artist: Auguste Rodin
- Year: 1889
- Medium: White marble
- Location: Museo Soumaya, Mexico City

Adonis Awakens (in French Le réveil d’Adonis, literally The Awakening of Adonis) is an 1889 sculpture by the French artist Auguste Rodin. Based on the account of Adonis in Book 10 of Ovid's Metamorphoses, it is signed “A RODIN” on the edge of the base. It is now in the Museo Soumaya in Mexico City.

== Background ==
Venus found Adonis as a baby and took him to the underworld to be fostered by Persephone and to protect him from the wrath of Apollo and Artemis. Once he had grown up she returned to collect him and - after being accidentally wounded by one of her son Cupid's arrows - fell in love with him. Persephone had also fallen in love with him and so Jupiter decreed that he should spend one third of each year with Venus, one third with Persephone and the remaining third with whomever he chose - Adonis opted for Venus, but was later gored to death by a wild boar.

== Description ==
The work shows a disconsolate Venus leaning over the sleeping body of Adonis, gored to death by Apollo in the form of a wild boar and symbolising Spring asleep in the arms of winter. Her hair drapes over and merges with the face of Persephone, asleep on Adonis' chest. Adonis sleeps in the hollow of a tree trunk, with Venus' knees on the earth. The phallus also evokes the start of the life-cycle, since when Adonis is dead autumn begins and cold prevents the growth of crops. They are surrounded by nymphs. The work exemplifies Rodin's mature style, particularly in the contrast between highly finished and unfinished areas.

== See also ==
- List of sculptures by Auguste Rodin
