= Illusions Received by the Earth =

Sculpture by Auguste Rodin

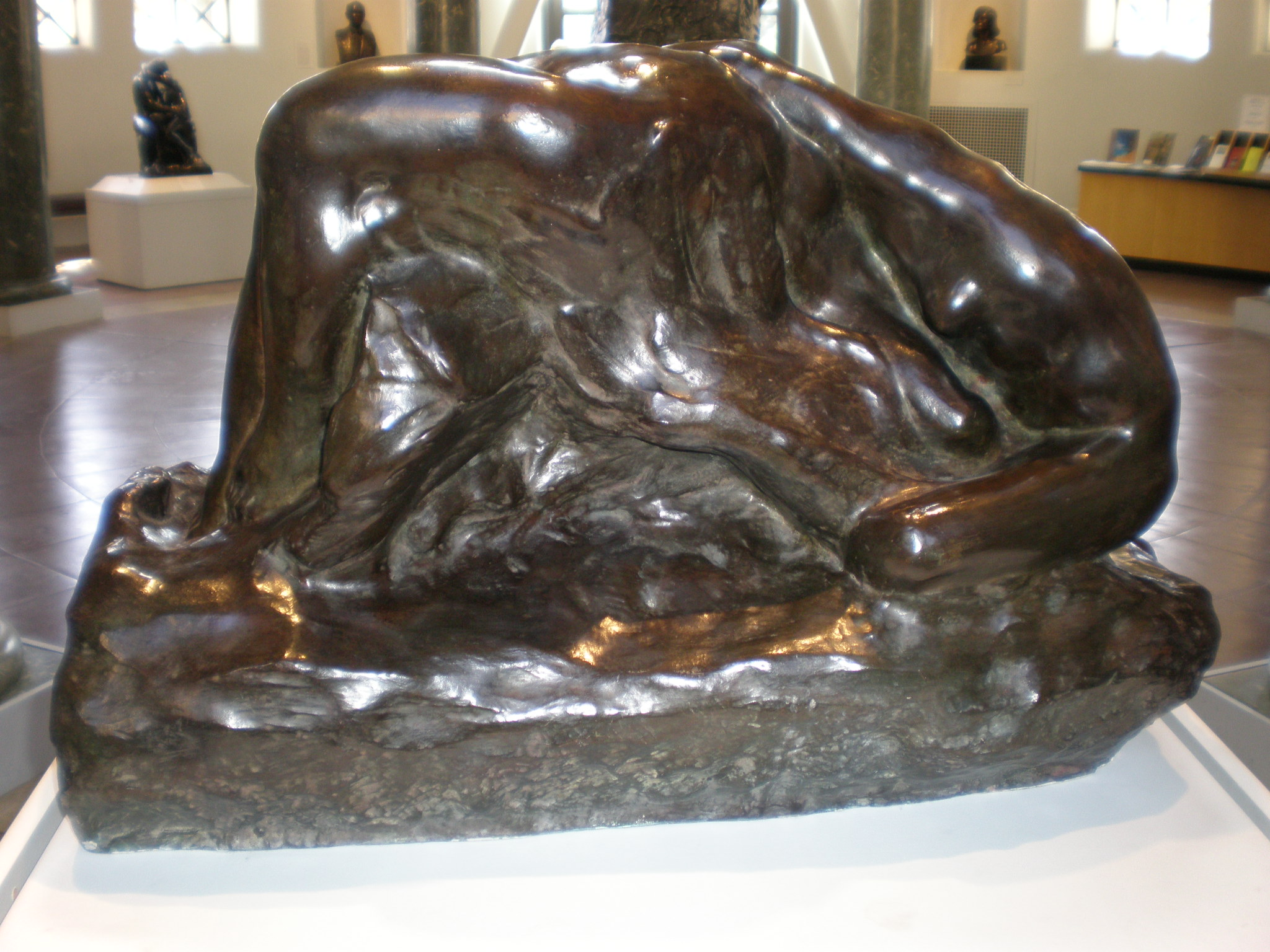
- at Stanford University
- Artist: Auguste Rodin
- Year: before 1900

Illusions Received by the Earth (Les Illusions reçues par la Terre) or The Fallen Angel (La Chute d'un ange) is a sculpture by Auguste Rodin, conceived before 1900 and cast before 1952 by the Rudier Foundry.

== Casts ==
One bronze cast of the work is now in Brooklyn Museum. It shows two female figures, using the Torso of Adele as the basis for one of them.

== See also ==
- List of sculptures by Auguste Rodin
