= Brother and Sister (sculpture) =

Sculpture by Auguste Rodin

- Le frère et la soeur
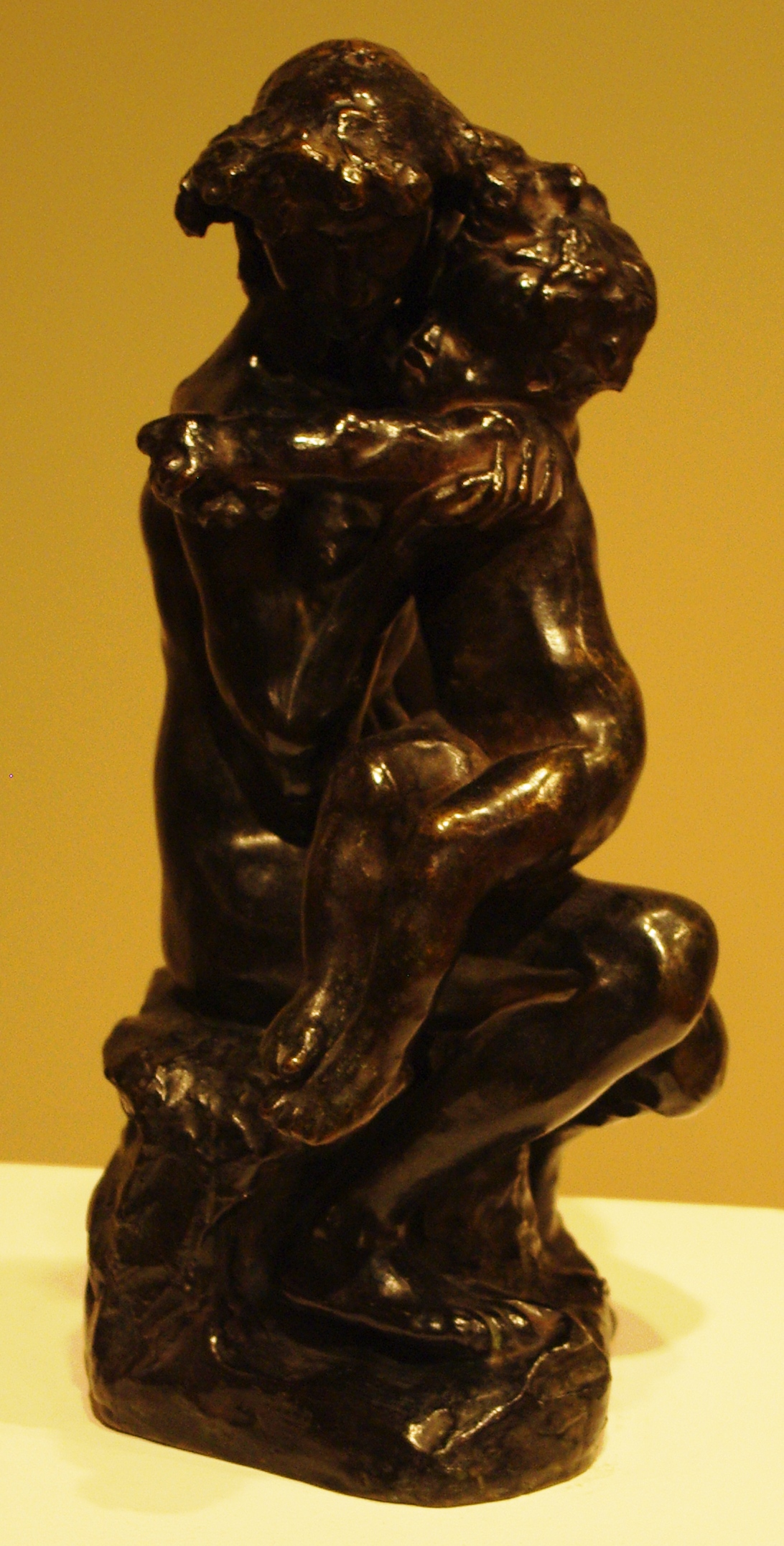
- The sculpture at the Portland Art Museum, 2014
- Artist: Auguste Rodin
- Year: 1890
- Type: Sculpture

Brother and Sister is an 1890 bronze sculpture by Auguste Rodin.

== Background ==
Rodin’s older sister, Maria, died in 1862, causing Rodin to enter a religious order and to stop his work for months.

== Interpretation ==
The sculpture may reflect memories of the lost love between brother and sister.

== See also ==
- 1890 in art
- List of sculptures by Auguste Rodin
