= Jules Dalou (sculpture) =

Sculpture of Auguste Rodin

Bust of Jules Dalou
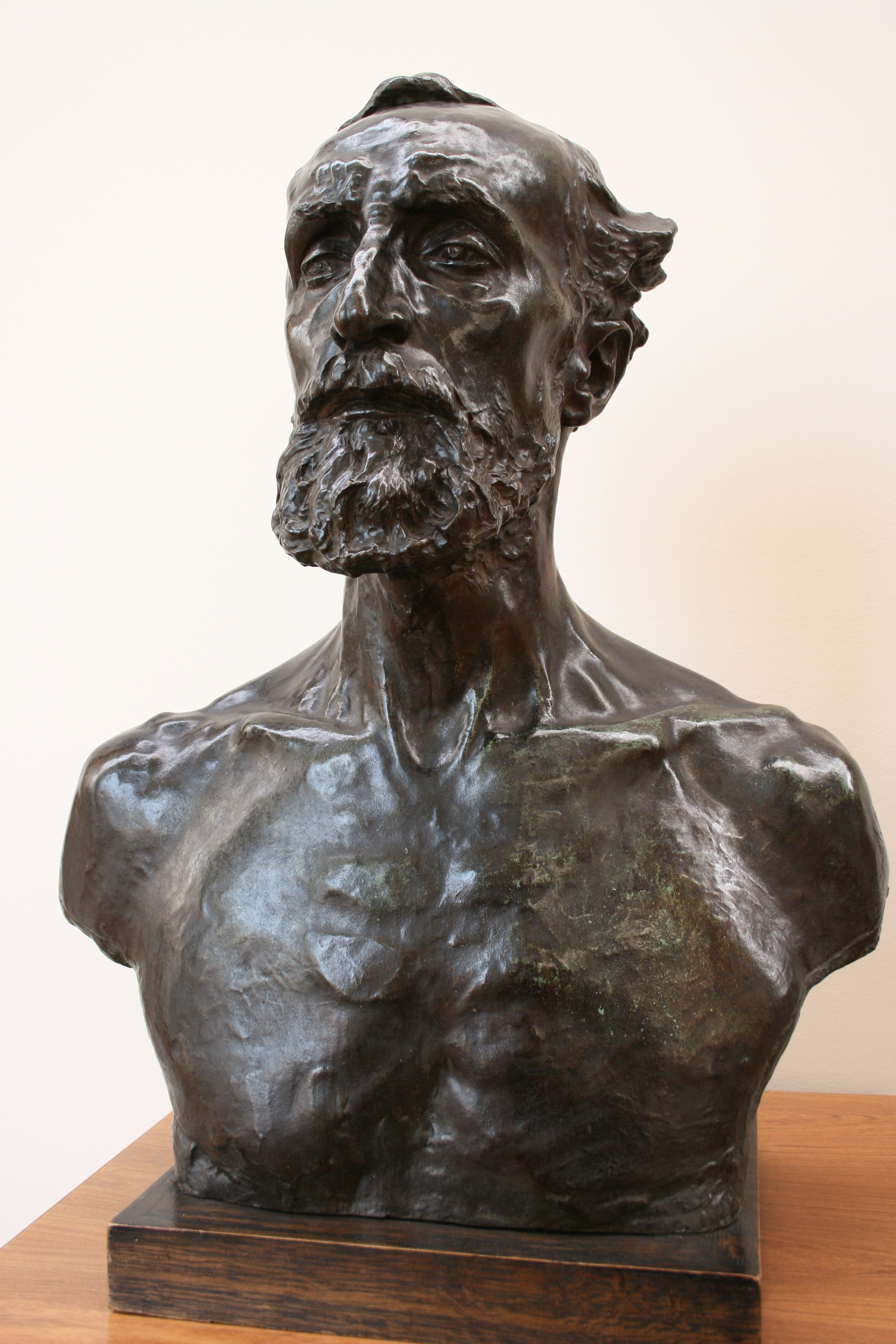
- Artist: Auguste Rodin
- Year: 1883
- Medium: Bronze

Jules Dalou is an 1883 bronze bust with green and brown patina. It shows Jules Dalou and was produced by his fellow-sculptor Auguste Rodin to mark Dalou's winning the medal of honour in 1882 when he first exhibited at the Paris Salon.

== Friendship ==
Dalou and Rodin had met as students at the Petite Ècole and had become friends. Rodin sent the work to Dalou in 1897 when the latter returned to France from London, but disagreements over it and Rodin's monument to Victor Hugo later ended the friendship.

== See also ==
- List of sculptures by Auguste Rodin
