= The Old Tree =

Sculpture by Auguste Rodin

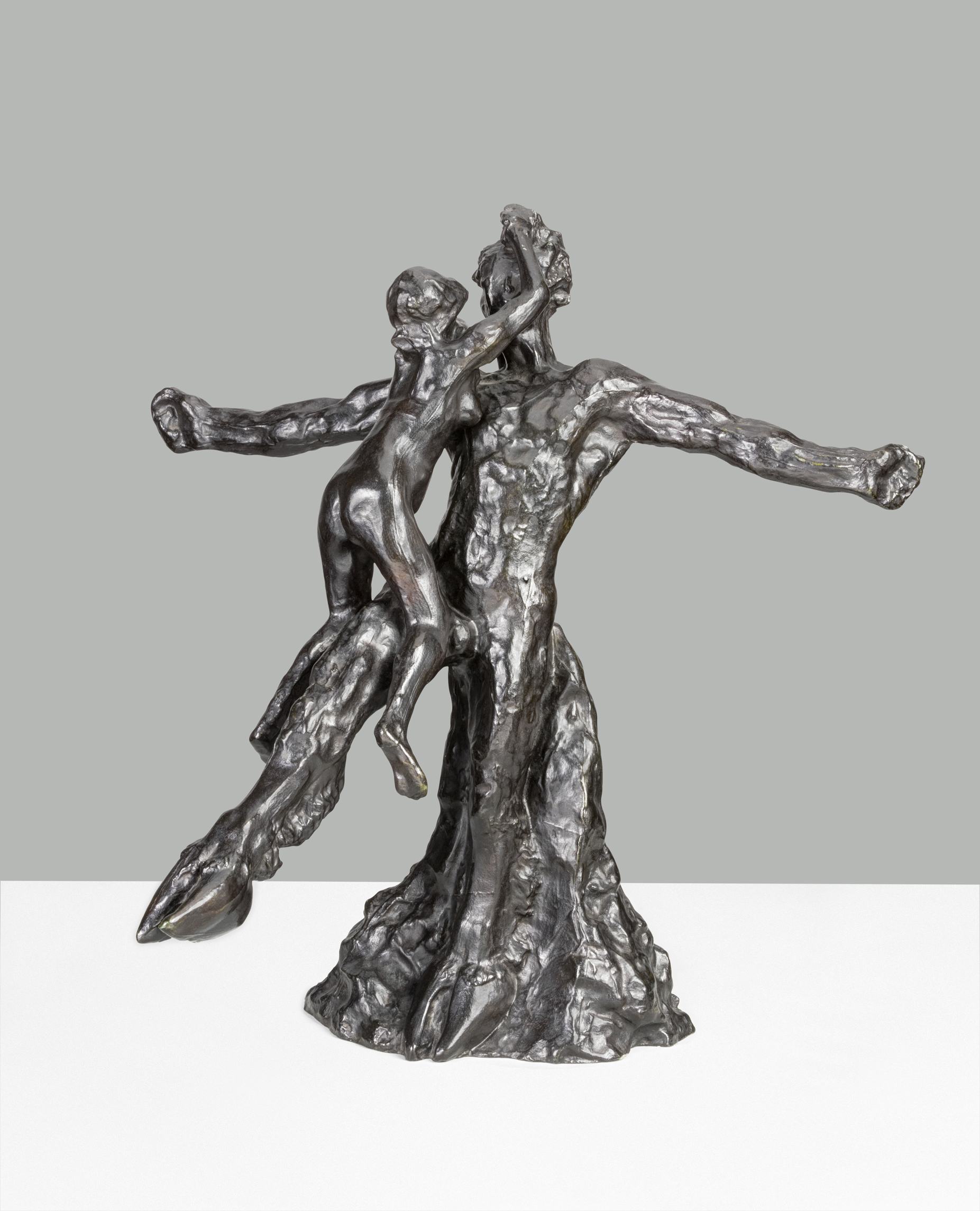
- Bronze cast of the sculpture
- Artist: Auguste Rodin
- Year: 1885

The Old Tree is a plaster sculpture by the French artist Auguste Rodin, originally conceived as part of his The Gates of Hell project.

== Work ==
Rodin produced it in 1885, only a year after the formation of the Salon des Independents. It measures 39.3 cm × 38.4 cm × 27 cm (15.5 in × 15.1 in × 10.6 in) and shows a nude young woman clinging to an old man holding his arms out like a tree, contrasting several opposites - male and female, youth and age, softness and roughness.

The work was cast from the plaster original by Georges Rudier's studio in black and green patina bronze. The bronze was exhibited in 1900 in the Pavilion de l'Alma and the La Plume salon - in La Revue Blanche, Felicien Fagus wrote:

At once human, animal and vegetable ... hairy and cracked, with branches and leaves, in which we can recognise Mercury and a small, wild and familiar woodland deity, who is none other than Little Fauna, and far from mythological themes, [Rodin] sees the symbol of an absolute faith in nature as the very substance of life.

== See also ==
- List of sculptures by Auguste Rodin
