= Adam (Rodin) =

Sculpture by Auguste Rodin

Adam, or The Creation of Man
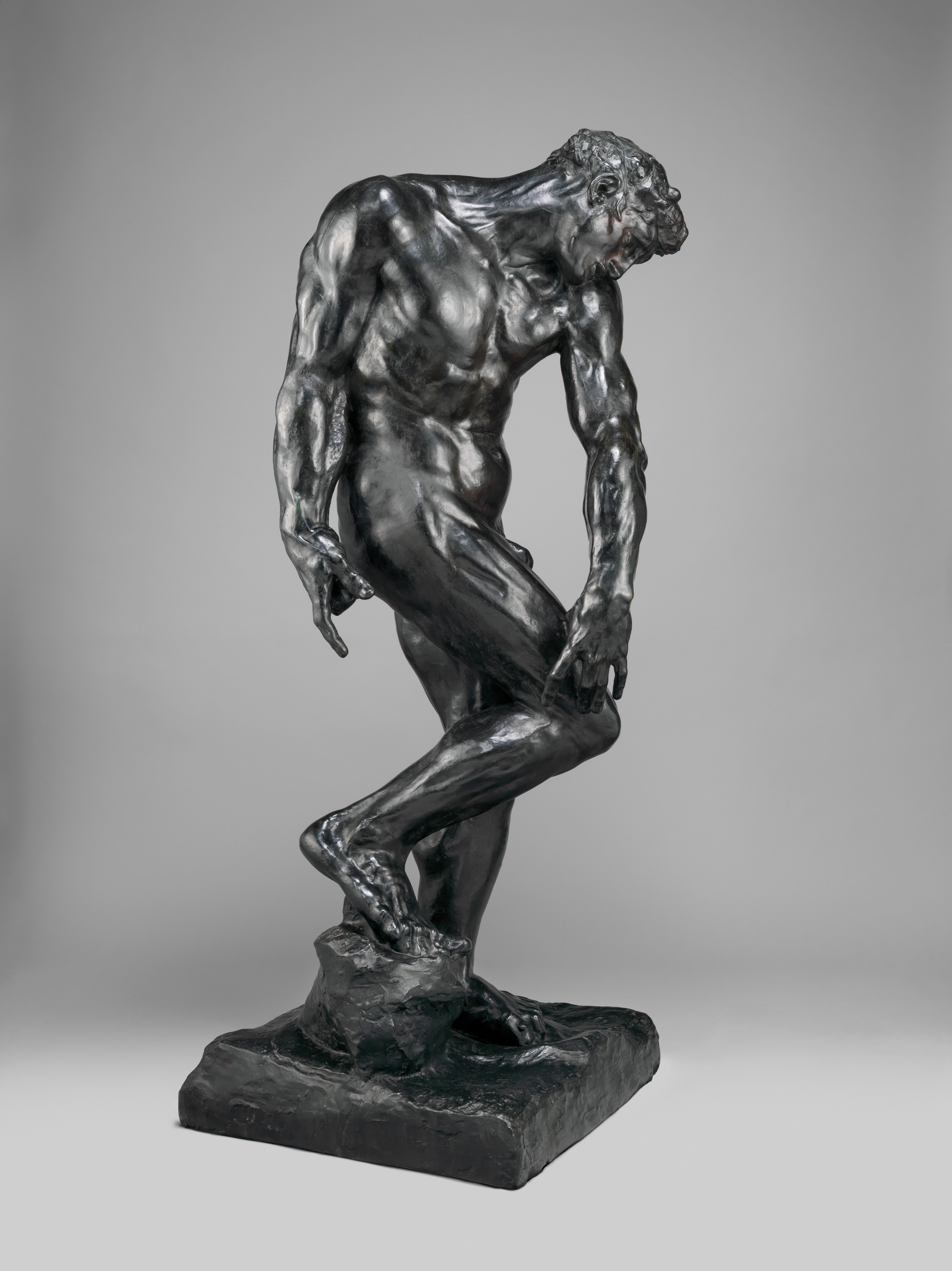
- The bronze cast in the Metropolitan Museum of Art
- Artist: Auguste Rodin
- Year: 1880-1881

Adam is an 1880-1881 statue of Adam by Auguste Rodin, first exhibited at the Paris Salon that year entitled The Creation of Man.

== Development ==
That year Rodin was also commissioned by France's Ministry of Fine Arts to produce two colossal figures of Adam and Eve, which he suggested using to flank his The Gates of Hell project, then ongoing. For the figure of Adam he reused The Creation of Man, whilst Eve was created separately.

== Casts ==
The work was first cast in 1910 and bronze casts of it are now in the Art Institute of Chicago, the Musee Rodin and the Metropolitan Museum of Art among others.

3D model, click to interact.

== See also ==
- List of sculptures by Auguste Rodin
