= Alsatian Orphan =

Sculpture by Auguste Rodin

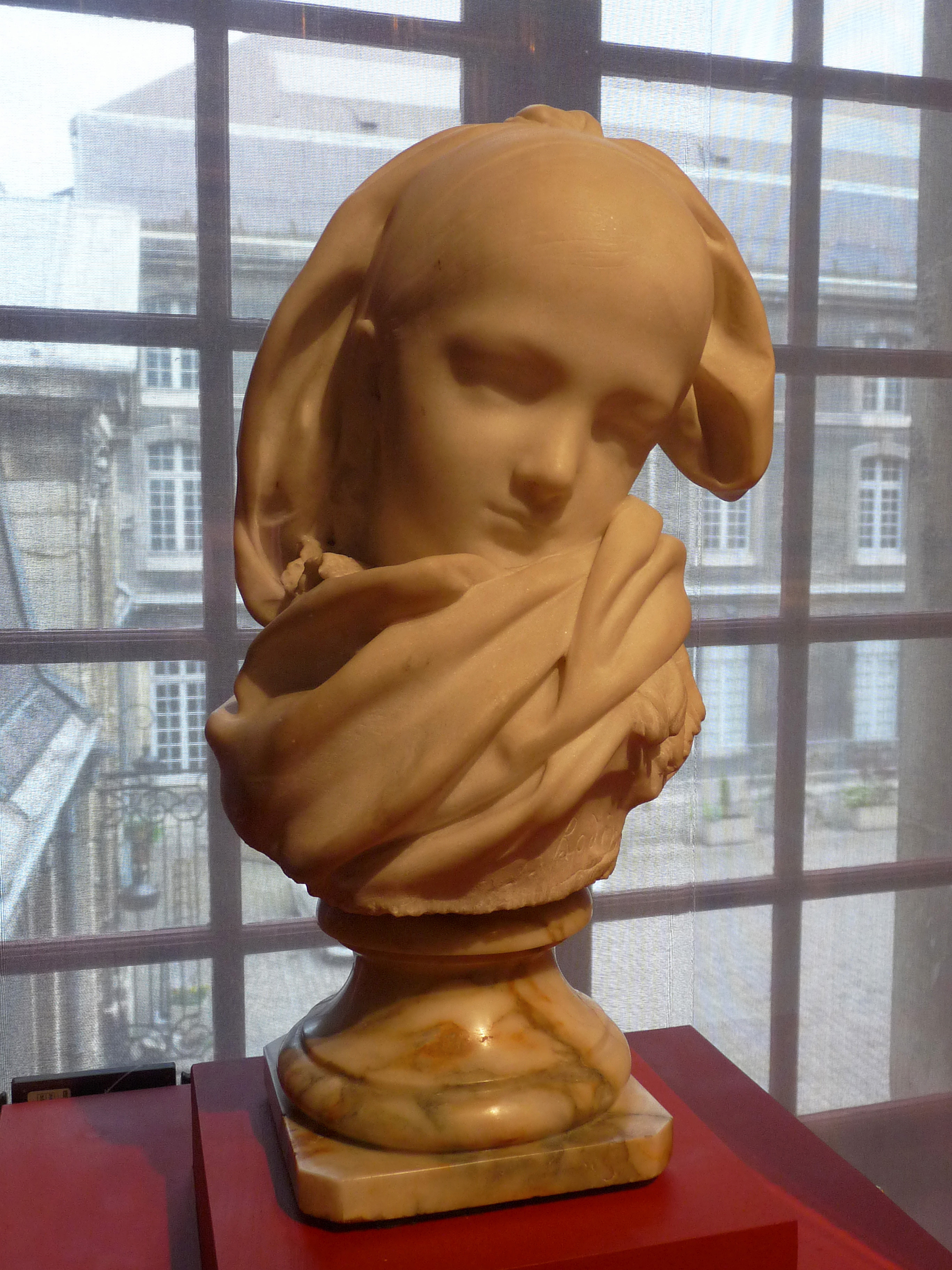
- at Musée des beaux-arts in Reims
- Artist: Auguste Rodin
- Year: 1871

The Alsatian Orphan / L'Orpheline Alsacienne is a sculpture made by the French artist Auguste Rodin (1840-1917). In the beginning of his career, Rodin made decorative pieces. This piece was created during this phase.

== Description ==
This bust represents a girl with her head slightly bent to the side. Her childish face expresses a soft melancholy. Her veil is characteristic of the province of Alsace, northern France which was lost in the Franco-Prussian War in 1870. The bust was described as "L'exemplaire" with her veil of silk arranged like a butterfly spreading its wings. The sculpture is considered one of Rodin's first big successes, and exhibited on several occasions between 1871 and 1884 and in several formats, including marble and terracotta.

== Work ==
There are several versions of this work by Auguste Rodin. Two of them are in exhibition at the Soumaya Museum in Mexico City.

- Huerfana alsaciana, L'Orpheline Alsacienne (Alsatian Orphan), white marble 39.1 x 22.7 x 19.4 cm.
- Huerfana alsaciana version con la cabeza derecha, L'Orpheline Alsacienne, version avec tête droit, (Alsatian Orphan, version with head right (or straight)), made 1877-1878 in terracotta, 36.2 x 22.3 x 17.7 cm.

== See also ==
- List of sculptures by Auguste Rodin
