= Youth Triumphant =

Sculpture by Auguste Rodin

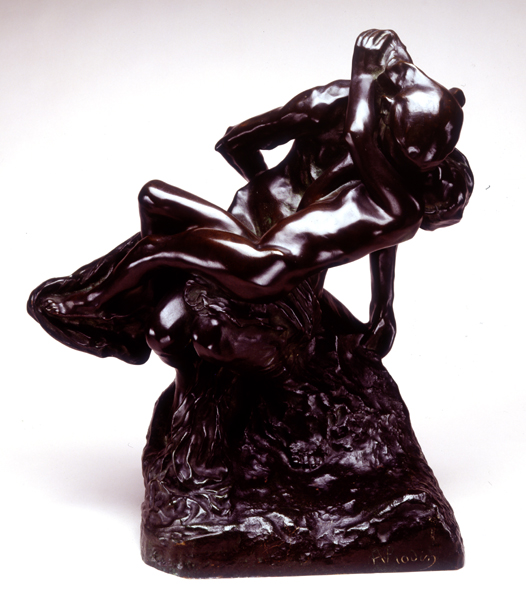
- at Museo Soumaya
- Artist: Auguste Rodin
- Year: c.1894 (conceived)
- Medium: Bronze with brown and green patina

Youth Triumphant is one of the sculptures created by Auguste Rodin as part of the planning for his The Gates of Hell. It was inspired by Jean Dampt's The Grandmother's Kiss, exhibited in 1893. That work shows a young woman resting in the arms of an old woman, with the pair deeply kissing.

== Versions ==
He also produced variants of the work. George Grappe concludes that - after Rodin became more popular and he and his companion Rose Beuret signed a 10-year contract with the Fumière et Gavinot foundry - the work was reproduced in different sizes. One cast is in the Museo Soumaya.

== See also ==
- List of sculptures by Auguste Rodin
