= Glaucus (sculpture) =

Sculpture by Auguste Rodin

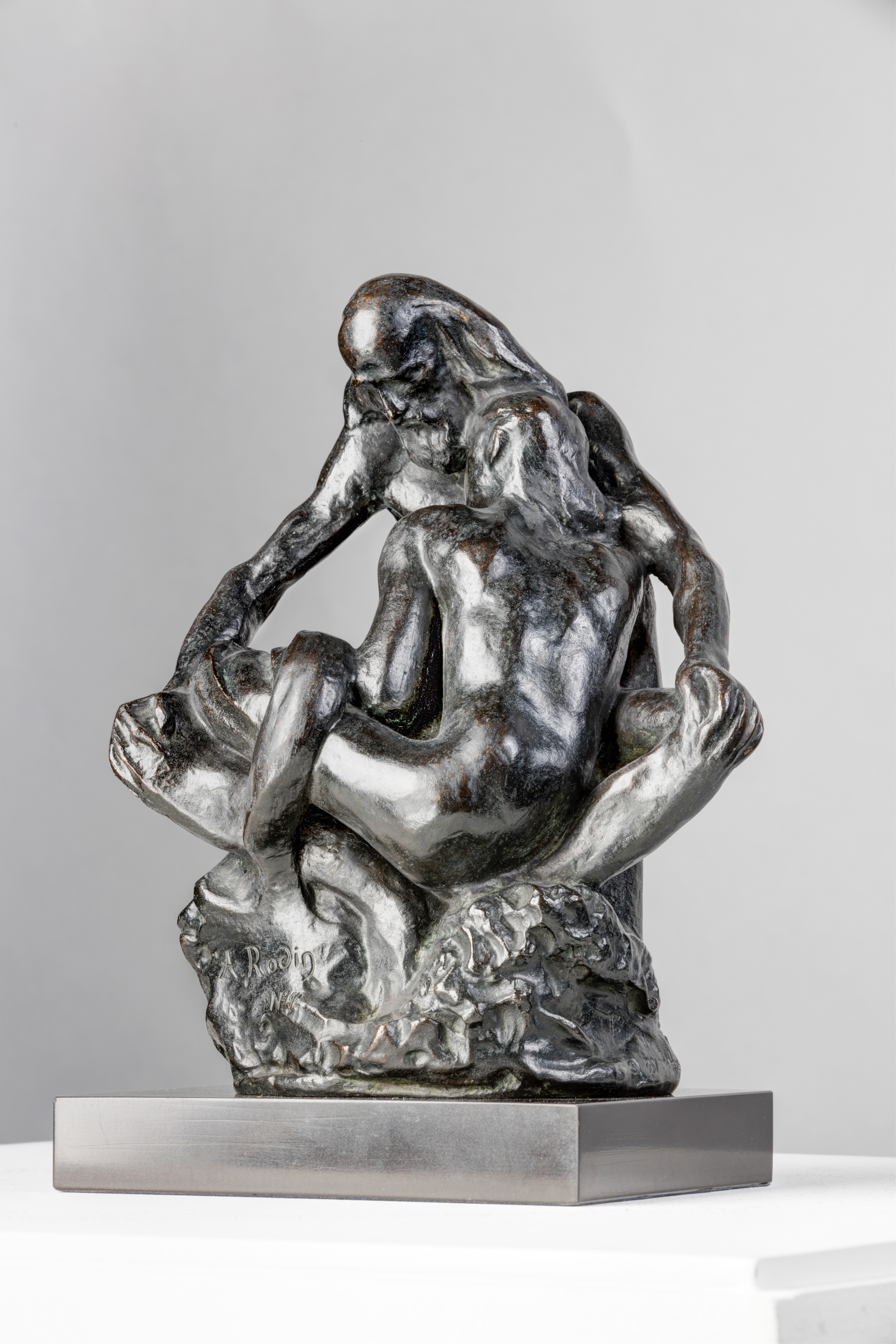
- Bronze version, Museo Soumaya, Mexico City
- Artist: Auguste Rodin
- Year: 1889
- Medium: Plaster, later bronze

Glaucus is a sculpture by the French artist Auguste Rodin, first conceived in 1886 as a representation of the mythological figure Glaucus, son of Poseidon. Originally made in plaster, bronze casts of it are now in the Brooklyn Museum and the Museo Soumaya.

== Inspiration ==
It was one of many studies arising from Rodin's reading of Ovid's Metamorphoses, here drawing on Book XIV, 1-74. It adds a female figure to the male figure from Seated Old Man in order to represent the myth of Glaucus and Scylla, meaning that it departs from the original myth in that both figures have human not monstrous legs. According to Bartlett, the work suggests that Glaucus is instead turning into a tree. (Note: Elsen cites Truman Bartlett: "Truman Bartlett saw the seated man in the doors and wrote, "The grave old being that sits with his legs well apart and rests his hands on his knees represents a man turning into a tree. On the door his back is towards the observer, and while going through his peacefully transforming process, he contentedly views the agitated panorama that stretches out in endless vista before him")

== Versions ==
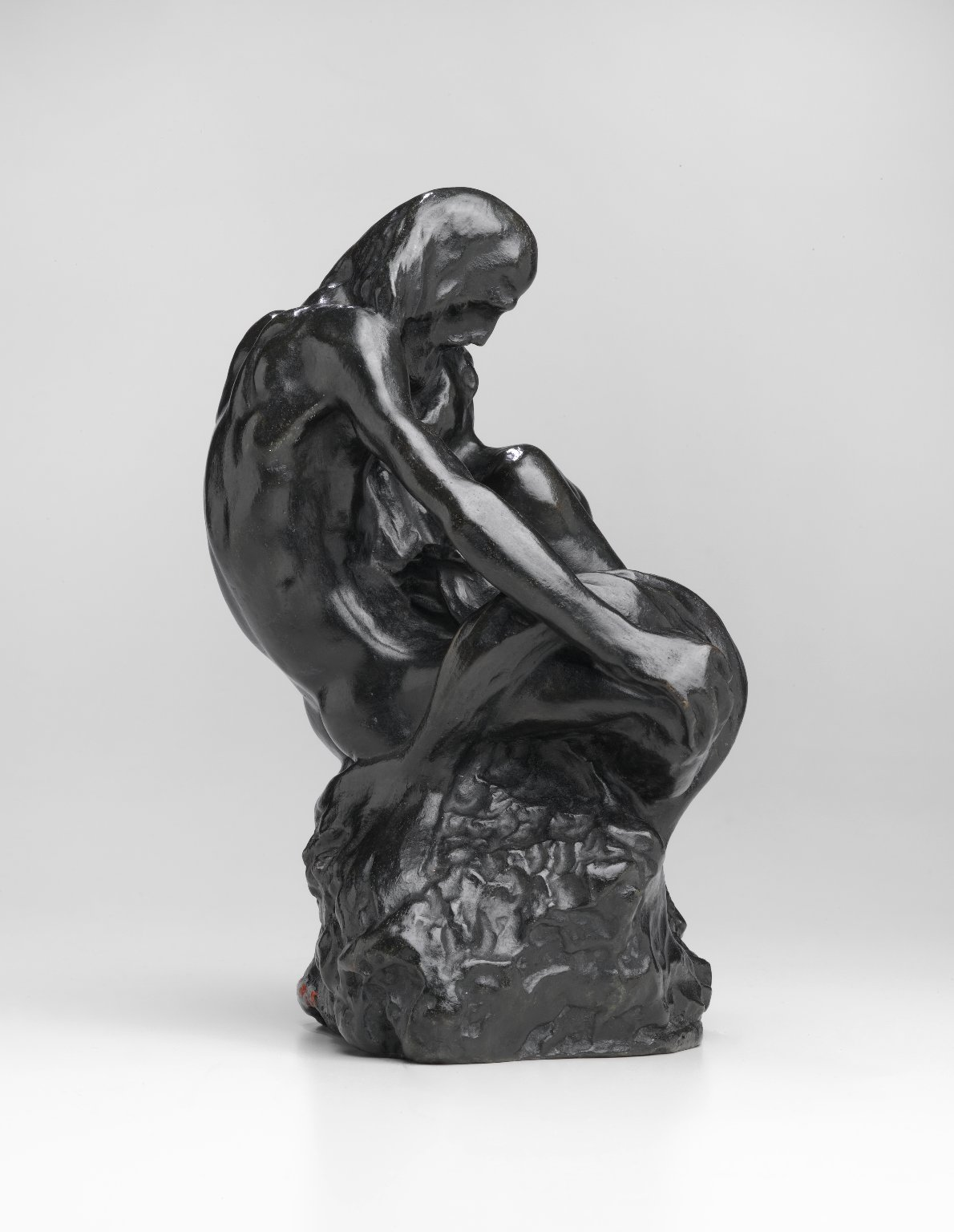
Glaucus, side view, Brooklyn Museum

There is a variant of it shows a woman leaning her head to the man's chest and so in known as The Confidence or Confiding. It also appears twice on Rodin's The Gates of Hell, both times with the figure resting on his back.

== See also ==
- List of sculptures by Auguste Rodin
