= Psyche Looking at Love =

Sculpture by Auguste Rodin

Psyche Looking At Love
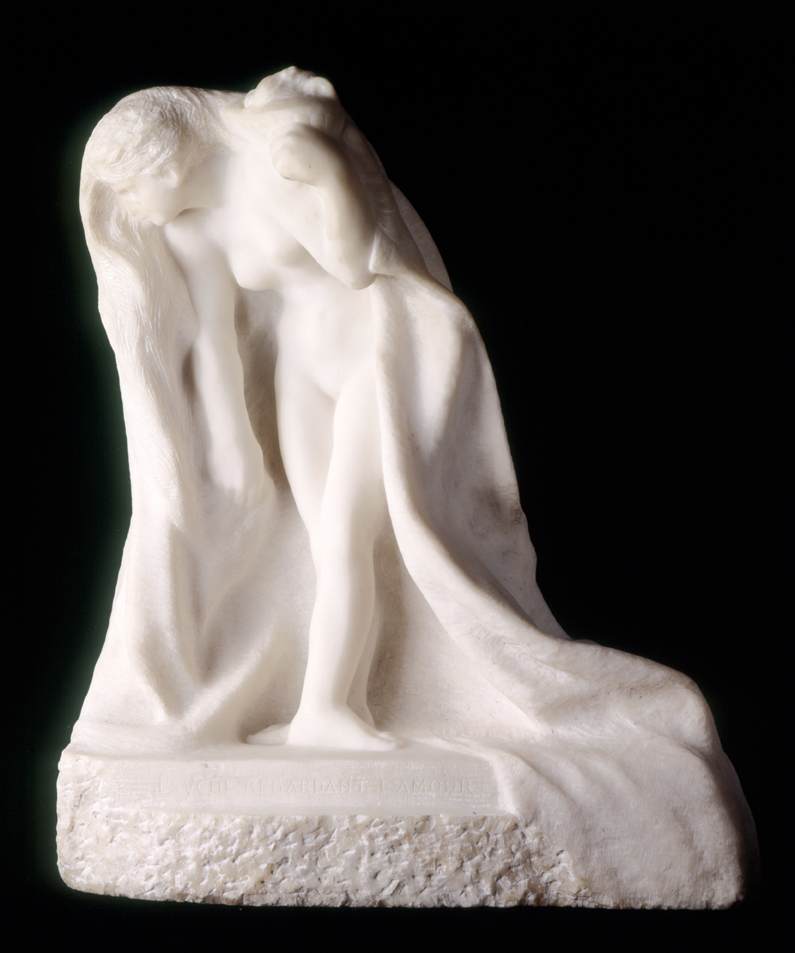
- The 1906 version.
- Artist: Auguste Rodin
- Medium: white marble

Psyche Looking at Love is a white marble statue produced by Auguste Rodin, drawing on the Cupid and Psyche myth.

== Variants ==
First conceived around 1885, it is known in several variants - for example, a 1906 autograph copy is now in the Museo Soumaya in Mexico City.

== See also ==
- List of sculptures by Auguste Rodin
