= Head of Saint John the Baptist (Rodin) =

Sculpture by Auguste Rodin

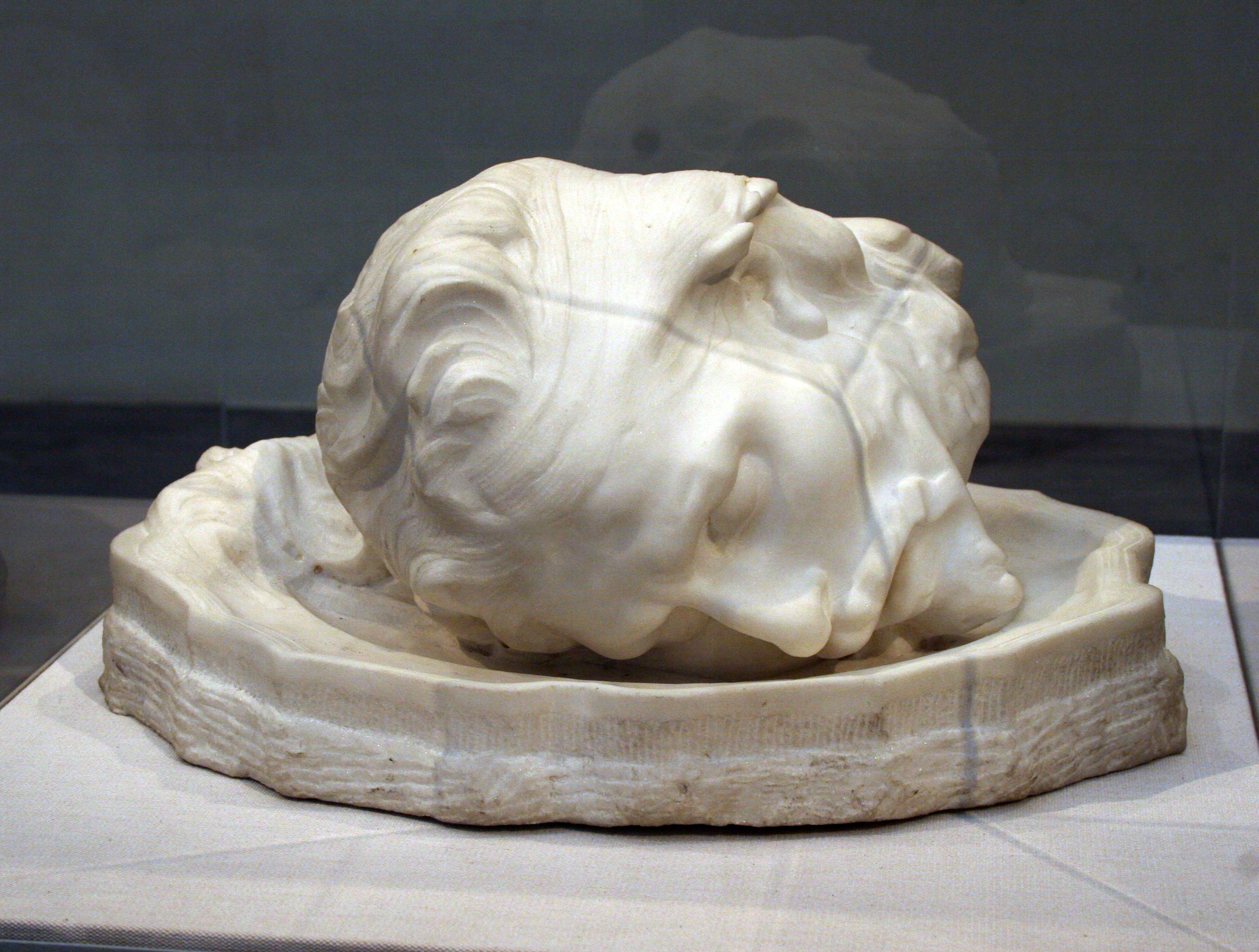
- The Severed Head
- Artist: Auguste Rodin
- Year: 1887
- Type: Sculpture
- Medium: Marble
- Subject: John the Baptist
- Dimensions: 23.9 cm × 39 cm × 31.1 cm (9.4 in × 15.3 in × 12.2 in)
- Location: Museo Soumaya, Mexico City

Head of Saint John the Baptist is a marble sculpture by French artist Auguste Rodin, sculpted in 1887 as part of a series of sculptures based on his Saint John the Baptist, exhibited for the first time in 1880 with great acceptance and recognition from critics.

== Design ==
In this sculpture, Rodin decides not to present the fragment as a bust, the most obvious choice, but to set the head on its side on a baptismal font in order to establish a greater reference to the biblical account of John the Baptist and to separate it from the rest of the fragment that would later be nicknamed The Walking Man, which had been stripped of all religious tendencies.

After Rodin decides to separate the sculpture based on the strong criticism it received, he realizes that he can imbue gestures in several discrete instants beginning with the separation of the head from the rest of the body; some authors have cited this as one of several examples of Rodin's achievement of stopping time as a counter-statement to the usage of photography in gestures.

== See also ==
- List of sculptures by Auguste Rodin
