= Octave Mirbeau (sculpture) =

Sculpture by Auguste Rodin

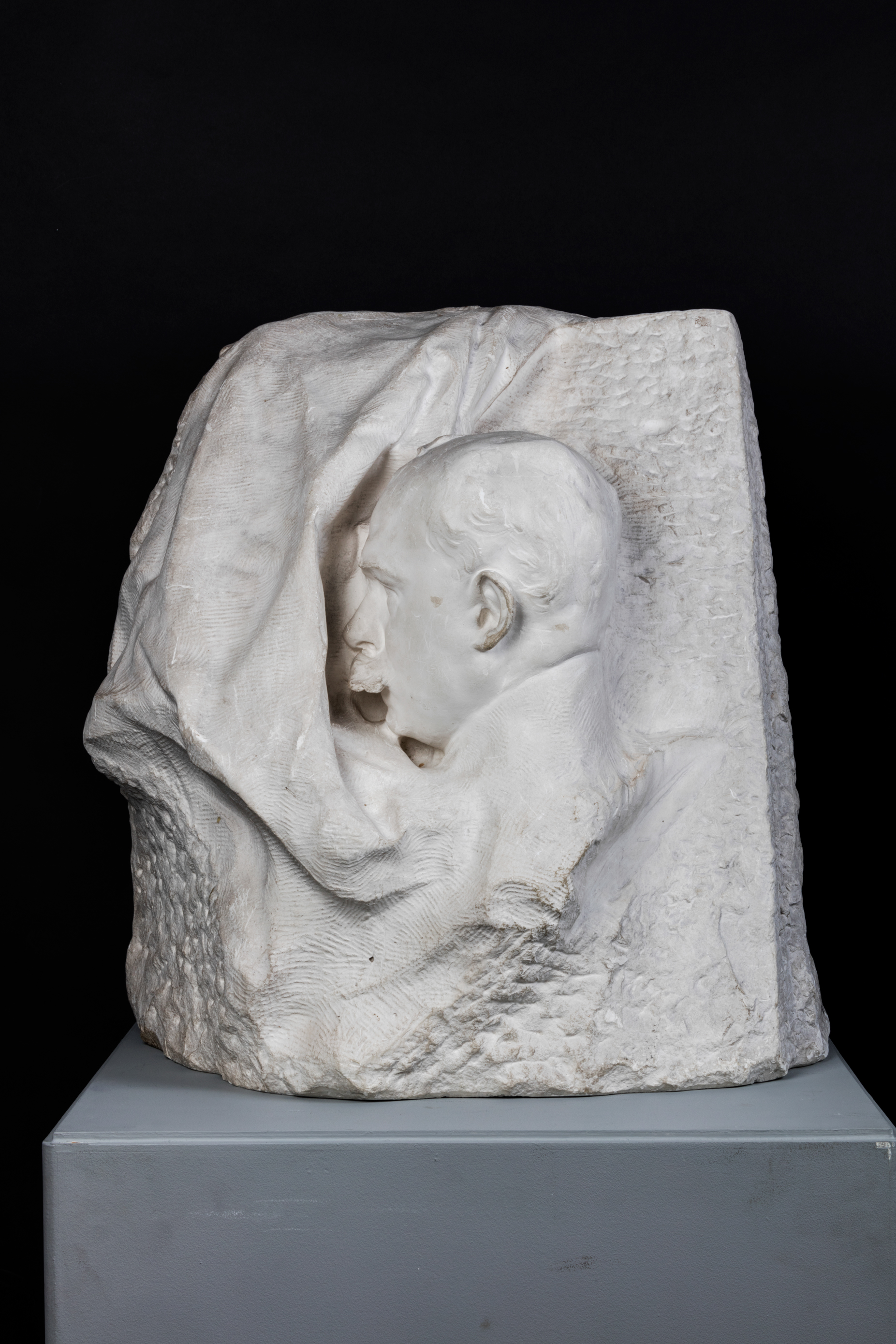
- Artist: Auguste Rodin
- Year: 1895
- Medium: Plaster
- Location: Museo Soumaya, Mexico City

Octave Mirbeau is an 1895 plaster relief by Auguste Rodin of the writer Octave Mirbeau, now in the Museo Soumaya. He had got to know him thanks to The Age of Bronze and The Gates of Hell - Mirbeau visited Rodin's studio, published the first description of Gates in the review La France, promoted Rodin's other work and died only a few months before the sculptor.

Rodin showed on several occasions gratitude towards the writer who played the important role of promoter of his work.

== Death ==
Mirbeau died on 16 February 1917, a few months before Auguste Rodin.

== See also ==
- List of sculptures by Auguste Rodin
