= Man with the Broken Nose =

Sculpture by Auguste Rodin

- Masque de l'homme au nez casse (French)
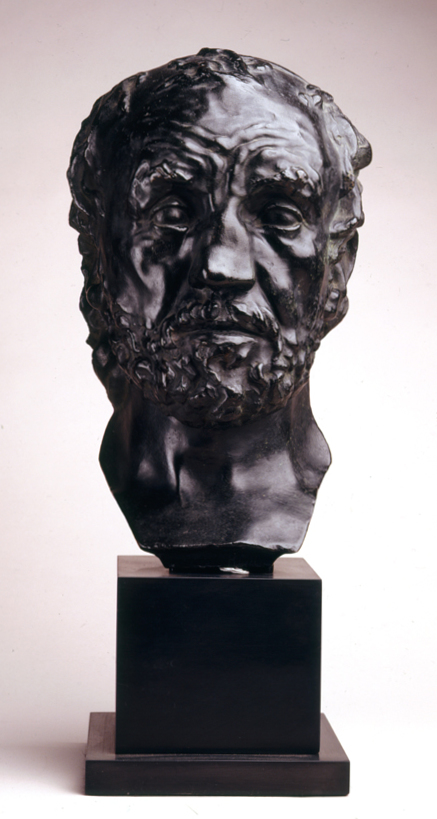
- Man with the Broken Nose
- Artist: Auguste Rodin
- Year: 1863
- Completion date: 1864
- Type: Sculpture
- Medium: Bronze
- Dimensions: 31.2 cm × 19 cm × 16.3 cm (7.9 in × 4.8 in × 4.1 in)
- Location: numerous

Man with the Broken Nose is a sculpture by Auguste Rodin created between 1863 and 1864 and approved by the Salon of 1875. It is considered the first by Rodin in which life is represented over the grace pervading the academic circles and aesthetic of the time.

Rodin made a first model of this piece on plaster in 1864, but lost the back of the bust. Later, in 1880, a second model, this time in bronze, was cast and is the surviving cast of the piece. A marble copy was made by Léon Fourquet.

== History ==
In 1867, Rodin adapted a stable to become his atelier, where he worked with a senior model by the name of "Bibi" to make his first model of the mask. According to Rainer Maria Rilke the man before Rodin was "a man with a calm demeanor and face. It had the face of a man which, when explored, was full of disorder".

== Description and influence ==
The sculpture was cast on bronze with black, brown and green patina. It has a 12.5 x 15.1 x 15.3 cm (3.1 x 3.8 x 3.8 in) base, where Rodin's signature can be found.

Even though there is a clear influence by other works at the Louvre, this mask represents the fidelity on contours that is characteristic of Rodin, made clear in the profound wrinkles and severe facial expression. This work was crucial in Rodin's unique aesthetical development.

According to the artist himself: "That mask determined all my future work; it's the first modeled piece I did. Ever since, I've tried to see my works from all possible points of view and to draw them in every one of their aspects. That mask has been on my mind in every thing I have done". His later portraits have a singular life and individuality, partly because Rodin stayed on his contour modeling principles.

== Problems ==
The mask was originally titled Portrait of M. *** and was generally rejected because it presented a man with a broken nose and strong, sharp facial features; which was considered ugly to the eyes of most people.

== See also ==
- List of sculptures by Auguste Rodin
