= The Kneeling Man =

1888 sculpture by Auguste Rodin

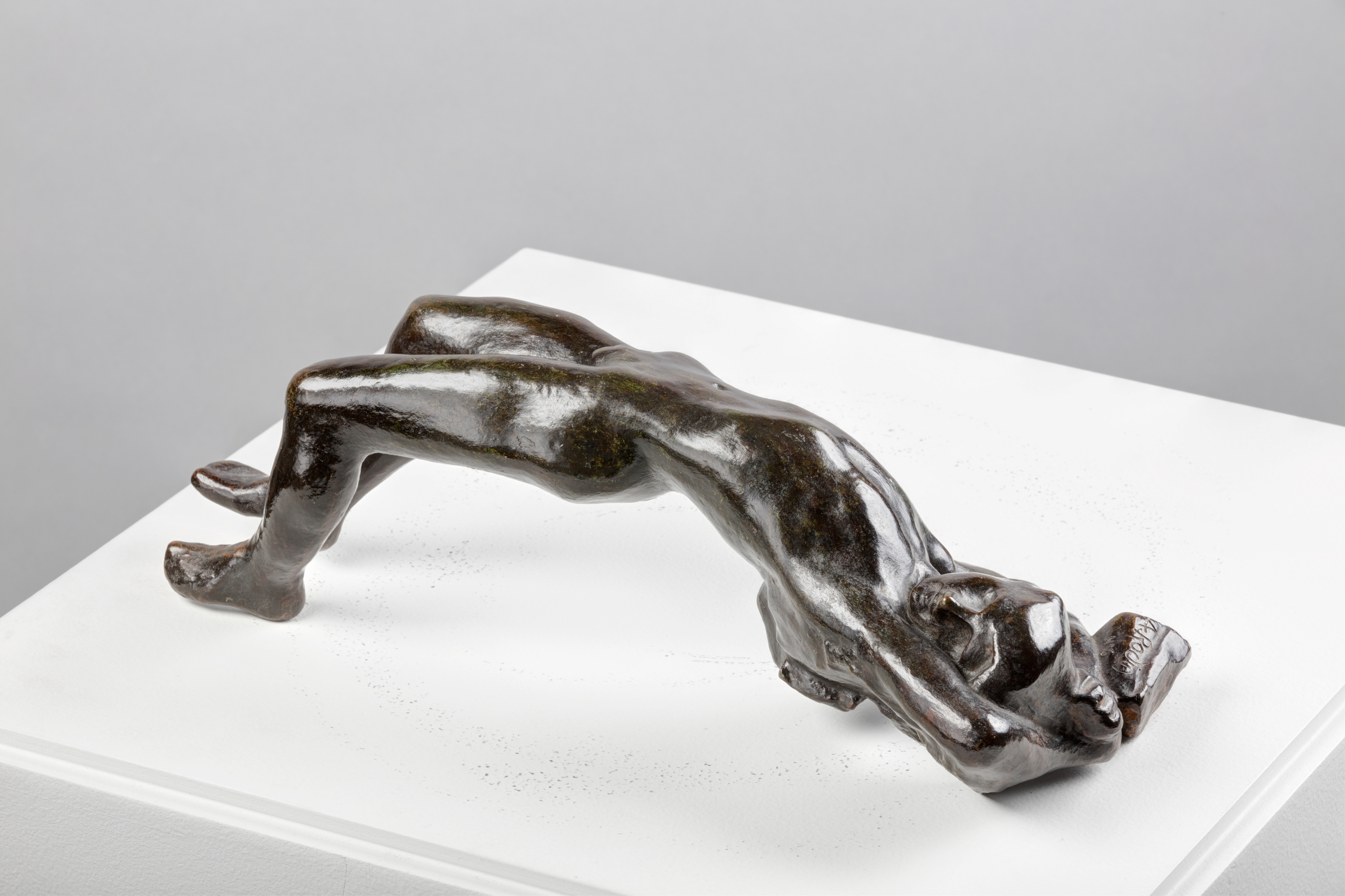
- The Museo Soumaya cast.
- Artist: Auguste Rodin
- Year: 1888
- Medium: Bronze
- Location: Museo Soumaya, Mexico City

The Kneeling Man is a work originally conceived in 1888 by the French artist Auguste Rodin for his The Gates of Hell project.

== Reuse ==
The work's arms and torso were reused for The Birth of Venus, a female version - Gates features both the male and female versions in the tympanum and the upper part of the right-hand panel. The same male figure was also used as part of The Maiden Kissed by the Ghost.

== Versions ==
It was cast in bronze with a brown and green patina in 1960 by the Rudier Foundry. One of these bronze casts is now in the Museo Soumaya in Mexico City.

== See also ==
- List of sculptures by Auguste Rodin
