= Bacchantes Embracing =

Sculpture by Auguste Rodin

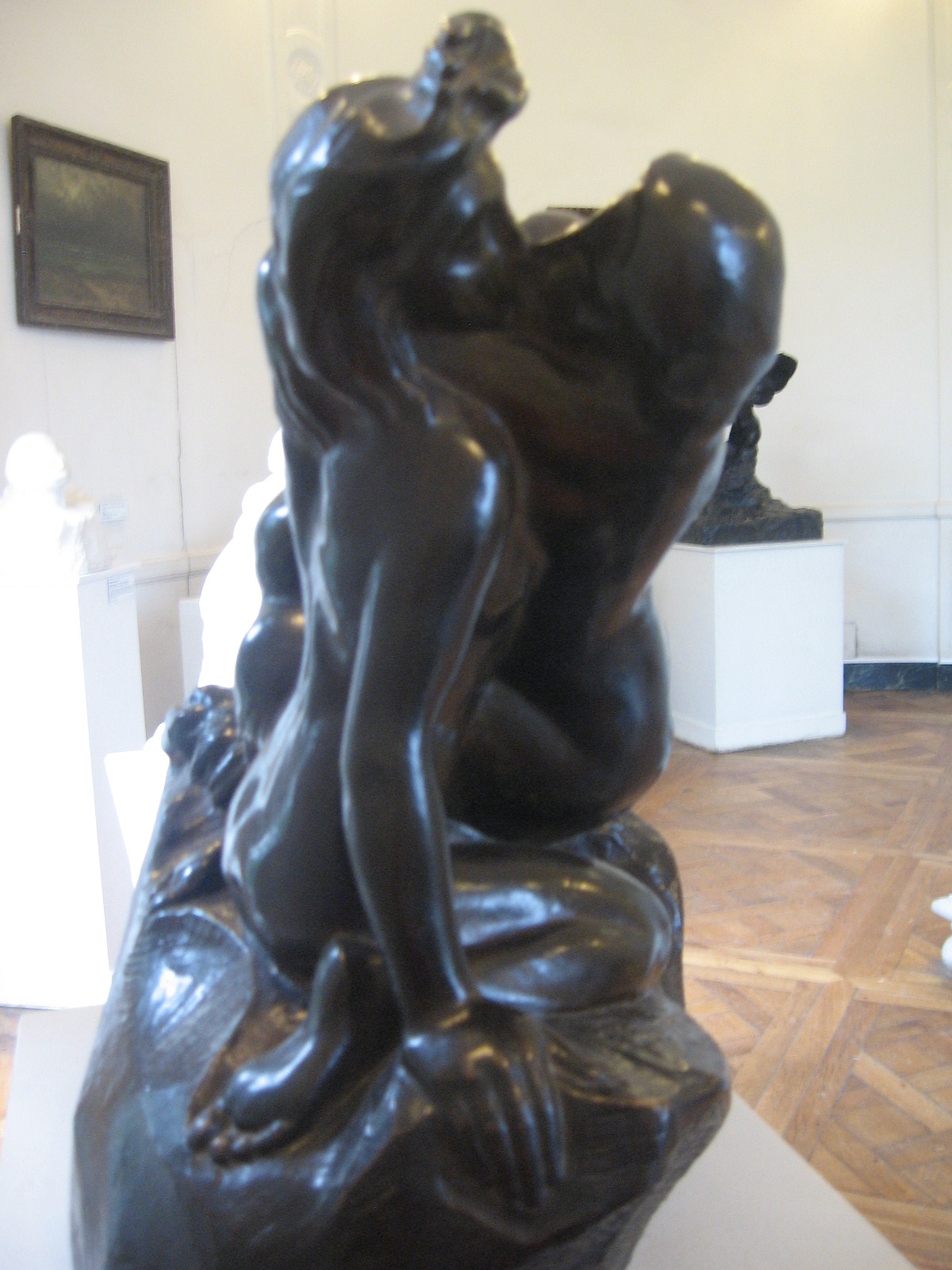
- Bronze cast at the Musée d'Orsay
- Artist: Auguste Rodin
- Year: before 1896 (conception)

Bacchantes Embracing is a sculpture by Auguste Rodin. Despite its title, it shows a bacchante embracing a female faun. It was probably originally conceived before 1896.

== Casts ==
A bronze cast made after 1967 is in the Brooklyn Museum.

== See also ==
- List of sculptures by Auguste Rodin
