= Young Woman with a Serpent =

Sculpture by Auguste Rodin

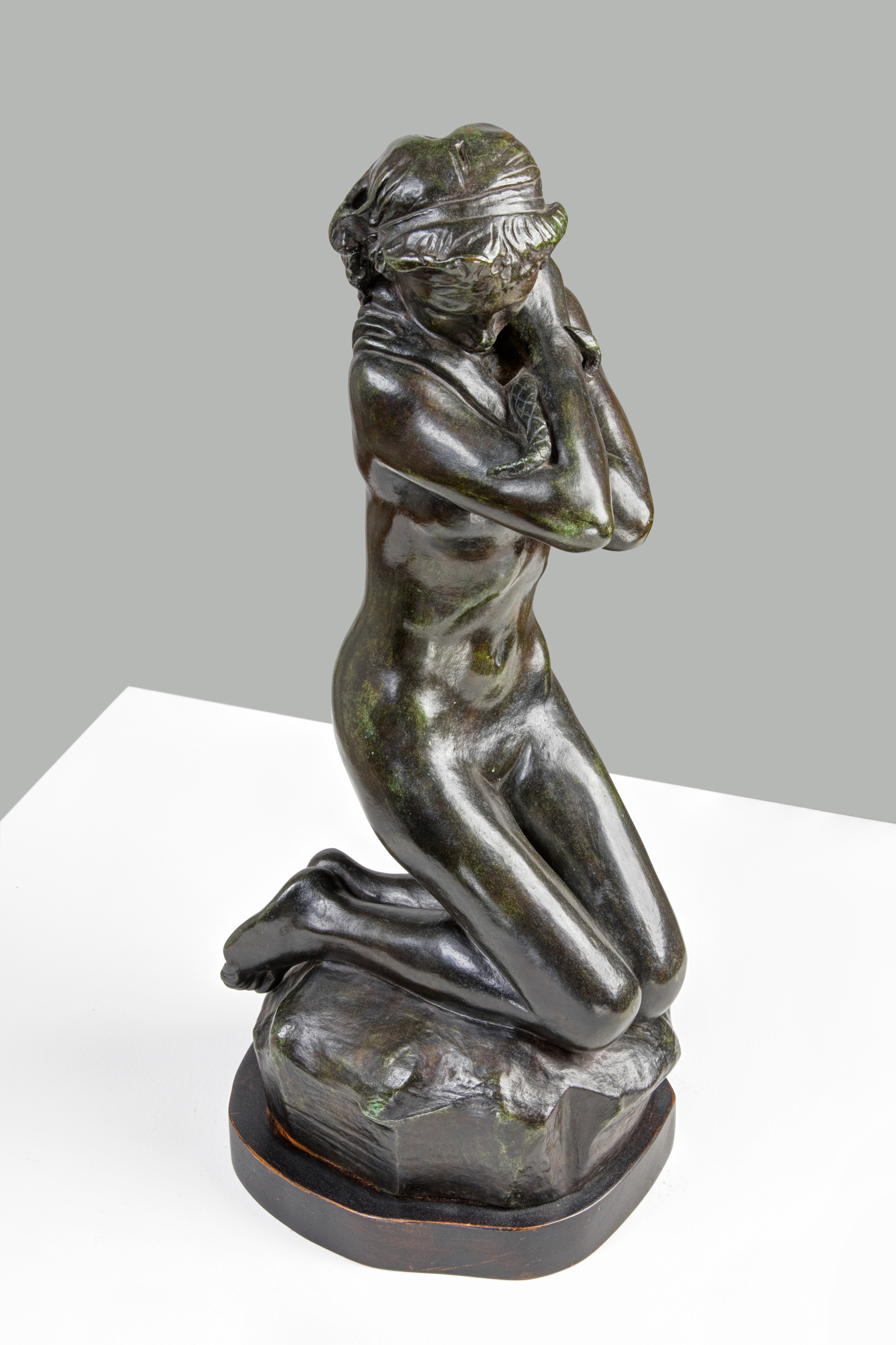
- The Museo Soumaya cast.
- Artist: Auguste Rodin
- Year: c. 1885
- Medium: Bronze

Young Woman with a Serpent (French: Jeune Fille au Serpent) is a c. 1885 sculpture by Auguste Rodin, realised in several media. The artist later used the figure in his 1905 Adam and Eve.

== Stolen bronze cast ==
A 1979 bronze cast of the work was stolen from a house in Beverly Hills in 1991 and was missing for two decades until the Comité Rodin, expert of the artist recognized the work in 2010 when a consignor brought it to Christie's to be auctioned. After a four-year legal battle between the insurer and the consignor, negotiations led by the Art Recovery Group resulted in the work being returned. It was subsequently sold at auction for $137,000 on November 13, 2015.

== Casts ==
Another cast from 1988 is exhibited in the Musée Rodin.

== See also ==
- List of sculptures by Auguste Rodin
