= List of sculptures by Auguste Rodin =

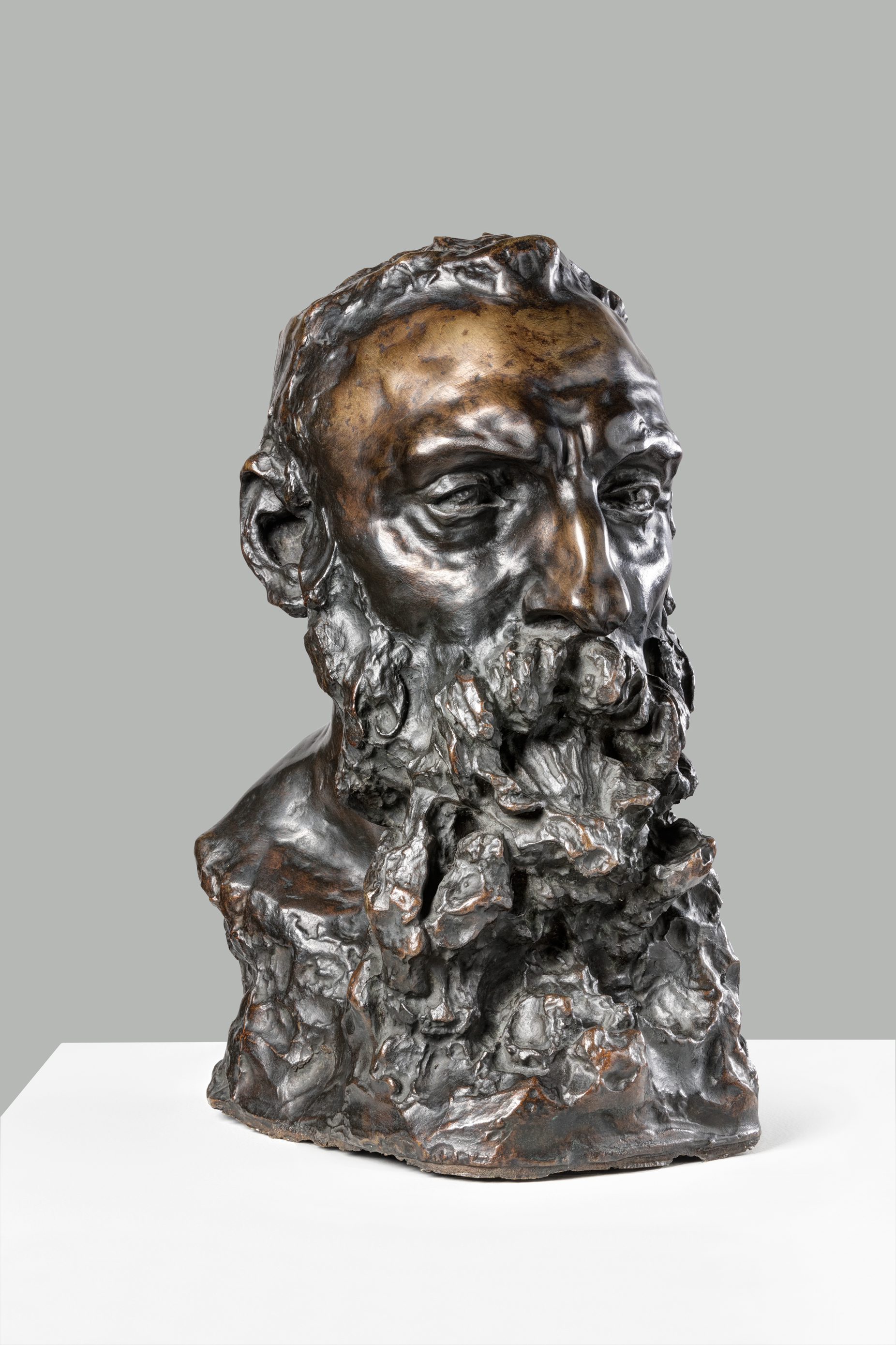
August Rodin by Camille Claudel

Notable works created by Auguste Rodin include the following, listed following the books Rodin, Vie et Oeuvre and Rodin.

== Sculptures ==
Image Title	Year Material Locations H x W x D in cm Wikimedia
Tête de femme, dite Madame Cruchet	1860 to 1865; Terracotta; Musée Rodin, Paris; 27 x 10 x 12; More images
La petite mousquetaire	1860 to 1865; Marble; Musée Rodin, Paris; 66.5 x 38.2 x 27.2; More images
Le reverend Père Julien Eymard	1863; Bronze and plaster Musée Rodin, Paris; 59 x 29 x 29; More images
Man with the Broken Nose	1863; Bronze; Museo Soumaya, Mexico City; 31.2 x 19 x 16.3; More images
Jeune femme et enfant	1864; Bronze; Musée Rodin, Paris; 57.5 x 34 x 36
Jean-Baptiste Rodin, Père de l'artiste	1865; Bronze; Musée Rodin, Paris; 41 x 22.8 x 24; More images
Jeune femme, chapeau fleuri de roses	1864; Terracotta; Musée Rodin, Paris; 52 x 32 x 31; More images
Tête de jeune fille	1865 to 1870; Terracotta; 40 x 18 x 17
Buste de jeune fille	1865 to 1870; Terracotta; 46 x 24 x 25
Jeune fille aux cheveux épars	1865 to 1870; Terracotta; Musée Rodin, Paris; 37 x 35 x 21
Diane Chasseresse	1865 to 1870; Marble; Musée Rodin, Paris; 50 x 33.5 x 29.5
Alsatian Orphan	1871; White marble Museum of Fine Arts, Reims; 39.1 x 22.7 x 19.4; More images
Mignon	1870; Bronze; Musée des beaux-arts, Angers; 40 x 32 x 27; More images
Masque de femme	1870; Bronze; 47 x 37
Madame Garnier	1870; Terracotta; Musée Rodin, Paris; 55 x 45 x 28
Monsieur L. Garnier	1870; Terracotta; Musée Rodin, Paris; 56 x 44.8 x 26
Buste de jeune paysanne	1871 to 1872; Terracotta; 30
Loos monument	1874; Antwerp; More images
Bacchante	1870 to 1875; Terracotta; Metropolitan Museum of Art, New York City; 39.4 x 22.5 x 23.8; More images
Doctor Jule-Adrien Thiriar	1872; Plaster; 57 x 47 x 28
Young Girl with Roses in Her Hair	1868; Terracotta; Cantor Arts Center, Stanford; 35.5 x 18.4 x 20.3
Suzon	1872 to 1873; Bronze; Los Angeles County Museum of Art; 40.01 x 20.32 x 17.78; More images
Buste de jeune femme	1870 to 1875; Terracotta; 32 x 20 x 18.5
Buste de jeune femme	1870 to 1875; Marble; 38
Buste de jeune fille	1870 to 1875; Terracotta; J. Paul Getty
Madame Léocadie Huguet	1870 to 1875; Terracotta
Buste de jeune femme	1875; Terracotta; 51.5
Paul de Vigne	1876; Bronze; 55 x 30 x 25; More images
The Age of Bronze	1877; Bronze; Fondation Bemberg, Toulouse; 174 x 60 x 60; More images
Saint John the Baptist	1877; Bronze; Museum of Fine Arts Bern; 204 x 63 x 113; More images
Mascarons	1878; Jardin des Serres d'Auteuil, Paris; More images
The Walking Man	1878 to 1907; Bronze; Musée d'Orsay, Paris; 213.5 x 71.7 x 156.5; More images
La Defense	1879; Bronze; Museo Nacional de Bellas Artes (Buenos Aires); 110 x 65 x 40; More images
Bellona	1879; Bronze; Musée d'Orsay, Paris; 77.5 x 57.8 x 36.8; More images
The Maiden Kissed by the Ghost	1880; Bronze; Museo Soumaya, Mexico City; 26.6 x 59.3 x 24.5; More images
The Shade	1880; Bronze; Museo Soumaya, Mexico City; More images
The Three Shades	1885; Bronze; Museo Soumaya, Mexico City; 189.5 x 184.5 x 111; More images
Adam	1881; Bronze; Metropolitan Museum of Art, New York City; 197 x 76 x 77; More images
Eve	1881; Bronze; Musée Rodin, Paris; 173,5 x 66,5 x 75,5; More images
Crouching Woman	1880 to 1882; Bronze; Los Angeles County Museum of Art; 31.75 x 25.4 x 17.78; More images
Ugolino and His Sons	1881; Bronze; Musée Rodin, Paris; 46.5 x 38.5 x 44.2; More images
Bust of Alphonse Legros	1881; Bronze; Calouste Gulbenkian Museum, Lisbon; More images
Bust of Jean-Paul Laurens	1881; Bronze; Musée des Augustins, Toulouse; 58 x 37 x 33; More images
Fallen Caryatid	1881; Terracotta; Maryhill Museum of Art, State of Washington; 40.6 x 25.4 x 26.4; More images
The Falling Man	1882; Bronze; Museo Soumaya, Mexico City; 58.8 x 39.9 x 31.2; More images
I am beautiful	1882; Bronze; National Museum of Western Art, Tokyo; More images
The Kiss	1882; Bronze; National Museum in Warsaw; 181.5 x 112.5 x 117; More images
Albert-Ernest Carrier-Belleuse	1882; Bronze; Cantor Arts Center, Stanford; More images
Bust of Maurice Haquette	1883; Bronze; Museo Soumaya, Mexico City; 53.5 x 26.7 x 41.1; More images
Jules Dalou	1883; Bronze; Museo Soumaya, Mexico City; 55.3 x 42.8 x 24; More images
Bust of Victor Hugo	1883; Bronze; Musée des Beaux-Arts de Dijon; 44.5 x 31.8 x 27.9; More images
J. Danielli	1883; Bronze; Musée Fabre, Montpellier; More images
Eternal Springtime	1883; Bronze; São Paulo Museum of Art; 66 x 80; More images
Camille Claudel	1884; Bronze; Musée Rodin, Paris; 27 x 21 x 21
Young Mother	1885; Bronze; Museo Soumaya, Mexico City; 38.8 x 26.7 x 36.5; More images
Young Mother in the Grotto	1885; Plaster; Philadelphia Museum of Art; 36 x 25,5 x 22; More images
Young Woman with a Serpent	1885; Bronze; Musée Rodin, Paris; 33.2 x 12.6 x 14.2; More images
The Martyr	1885; Bronze; Museo Soumaya, Mexico City; 27.6 x 148 x 98.5; More images
Mask of a Weeping Woman	1885; Bronze; Museo Soumaya, Mexico City; 31.2 x 19.1 x 17.3; More images
The Old Tree	1885; Bronze; Museo Soumaya, Mexico City; 39.3 x 38.4 x 27; More images
Amor and Psyche	1885; Marble; Petit Palais, Paris; More images
Avarice and Lust	1885; Bronze; Museo Nacional de Bellas Artes (Buenos Aires); More images
Large Hand of a Pianist	1885; Bronze; Musée Rodin, Paris; More images
Ixelles Idyll	1885; Bronze; Musée Rodin, Paris; More images
Woman and Child	1885; Marble; National Gallery of Art, Washington D.C. 43.2 x 44.4 x 33.1; More images
Paolo and Francesca	1885; Bronze; Kunsthaus Zürich; More images
The Weeping Burgher (Andrieu d'Andres)	1885; Bronze; Metropolitan Museum of Art, New York City; 43.2; More images
Jean d'Aire	1885; Bronze; Fin-de-Siècle Museum, Brussels; 46.5 x 16 x 15.5; More images
Eustache de Saint Pierre	1885 to 1886; Bronze; Museo Soumaya, Mexico City; 98 x 34 x 36,5; More images
Jean de Fiennes	1885 to 1886; Bronze; Museo Soumaya, Mexico City; 201 x 122 x 81.6; More images
Pierre de Wiessant	1887; Bronze; Metropolitan Museum of Art, New York City; 44.6 × 21.9 × 21.8; More images
The Burghers of Calais	1884 to 1889; Bronze; Metropolitan Museum of Art, New York City; 201.6 × 205.4 × 195.9; More images
Kneeling Female Faun	1884; Bronze; Gates of Hell, Musée Rodin, Paris; More images
Torso of Adele	1884; Plaster; Musée Rodin, Paris; 11×37.5; More images
Octave Mirbeau	1885; Marble; Museo Soumaya, Mexico City; 60.5 x 59 x 33; More images
Damned Women	1885 to 1890; Bronze; Museo Soumaya, Mexico City; 20.6 x 28.6 x 12.7; More images
Fugitive Love	1886; Bronze; Musée du Luxembourg; 43.6 x 49.8 x 29.7; More images
Meditation or The Interior Voice	1886; Bronze; Musée Rodin, Paris; 144.5 x 77 x 57; More images
Minotaur or Faun and Nymph	1886; Bronze; Los Angeles County Museum of Art; 33.02 x 27.94 x 24.13; More images
The Cry	1886; Bronze; Musée Rodin, Paris; More images
Ovid's Metamorphoses	1886 to 1889; Bronze; Museo Soumaya, Mexico City; 32.2 x 40.5 x 25.5; More images
Claude Gellée called Le Lorrain	1886 to 1892; Bronze; Musée Rodin, Paris; More images
Head of Saint John the Baptist	1887; Marble; Legion of Honor, San Francisco; 23.9 x 39 x 31.1; More images
The Sirens	1887; Bronze; Museo Soumaya, Mexico City; 22 x 22.2 x 13.5; More images
Orpheus and Eurydice	1887; Bronze; Metropolitan Museum of Art, New York City; 123.8 × 79.1 × 64.5; More images
Female Centaur	1887 to 1889; Bronze; Los Angeles County Museum of Art; 45.72 x 44.45 x 15.55; More images
The Death of Adonis	1888; Bronze; Musée d'arts de Nantes; 14.9 x 27 x 14.6; More images
The Kneeling Man	1888; Bronze; Museo Soumaya, Mexico City; 10.4 x 12.1 x 32.5; More images
Polyphemus	1888; Bronze; Museo Soumaya, Mexico City; 24.2 x 15.8 x 14.5; More images
Standing Mercury	1888; Bronze; Museo Soumaya, Mexico City; 38.8 x 38 x 22.1; More images
Adonis Awakens	1889; White marble Museo Soumaya, Mexico City; 44.6 x 86; More images
The Succubus	1889; Bronze; Museo Soumaya, Mexico City; 23.3 x 17.1 x 16.8; More images
The Eternal Idol	1889; Plaster; Fogg Art Museum, Harvard University; More images
Young Girl Confiding Her Secret to Isis	1889; Bronze; Cleveland Museum of Art; 23 x 12 x 15; More images
Andromeda	1889; Bronze; More images
Pygmalion and Galatea	1889; Marble; Metropolitan Museum of Art, New York City; 97.2 x 88.9 x 76.2; More images
Cybele	1889 to 1890; Bronze; Musée Rodin, Paris; 160 × 79 × 120; More images
She Who Was the Helmet-Maker's Beautiful Wife	1889 to 1890; Bronze; Los Angeles County Museum of Art; 49.5 x 30.5 x 19.7; More images
Glaucus	1889 to 1890; Bronze; Museo Soumaya, Mexico City; 21.9 x 16.5 x 12.5; More images
La Douleur (de La Porte)	1889 to 1892; Bronze; Musée Rodin, Paris; 27.94 x 15.24 x 12.7; More images
Danaid	1890; Marble; Museo Nacional de Bellas Artes (Buenos Aires); 31.7 × 67.2 × 44.9; More images
Despair	1890; Bronze; Musée Rodin, Paris; 35,5 x 36,5 x 30; More images
Brother and Sister	1890; Bronze; Metropolitan Museum of Art, New York City; 38.1 x 21.6 x 20.3; More images
Toilette of Venus and Andromeda	1890; Bronze; Musée Rodin, Paris; More images
Toilette of Venus	1890; Bronze; Musée Rodin, Paris; More images
Pierre Puvis de Chavannes	1890; Bronze; Metropolitan Museum of Art, New York City; 53.3 x 50.8 x 31.8; More images
Henri Rochefort	1890; Bronze; Musée d'Orsay, Paris; 50; More images
Tragic Muse	1890 to 1892; Bronze; Pinacoteca do Estado de São Paulo; More images
The Fall of the Angels	1890 to 1900; Marble; Cleveland Museum of Art; 53.5 x 69.9 x 40.6; More images
Iris, Messenger of the Gods	1891; Bronze; National Museum of Art, Architecture and Design, Oslo; 83.5 x 85; More images
Balzac in the Robe of a Dominican Monk	1892; Bronze; Museo Soumaya, Mexico City; 106.4 × 38.5 × 50.8; More images
Monument to Balzac	1892 to 1897; Bronze; Musée Rodin; 270 x 120.5; More images
Youth Triumphant	1894; Bronze; Portland Museum of Art; 52.1; More images
Bacchantes Embracing	1894; Bronze; Brooklyn Museum, New York City; More images
The Blessings	1894; Bronze; Museo Soumaya, Mexico City; 81 x 70.6 x 57.9; More images
Palais Royal Monument to Victor Hugo	1897; Bronze; Philadelphia Museum of Art; More images
The Hand of God	1897 to 1898; Marble; Metropolitan Museum of Art, New York City; 73.7 x 60.3 x 64.1; More images
The Evil Spirits	1899; Marble; National Gallery of Art, Washington D.C. 71.2 x 75.7 x 59; More images
Man and his Thought	1896 to 1900; Marble; National Gallery (Berlin); 77 x 46; More images
The Spirit of Eternal Repose	1899 to 1902; Bronze; Pinacoteca do Estado de São Paulo; 193 x 100 x 91; More images
Monument to Domingo Sarmiento	by 1900; Bronze; Plaza Sicilia, Barrio de Palermo, Buenos Aires, Argentina; More images
Illusions Received by the Earth	by 1900; Marble; Palais des Beaux-Arts, Lille; 52.1 x 83.2 x 56.5; More images
La Tentation de Saint Antoine	by 1900; Marble; Museum of Fine Arts of Lyon; 61 x 117 x 70; More images
Tête de la douleur	1901; Bronze; Musée d'Orsay, Paris; 52.1 x 83.2 x 56.5; More images
The Athlete	1904; Bronze; Museo Soumaya, Mexico City; 39,4 × 27,5 × 24,3; More images
The Thinker	1904; Bronze; Metropolitan Museum of Art, New York City; 180 × 97 × 140; More images
La France	1904; Bronze; Maryhill Museum of Art, State of Washington; More images
George Wyndham	1904; Bronze; Metropolitan Museum of Art, New York City; More images
Adam and Eve	1905; Bronze; Musée Rodin, Paris; More images
The Prodigal Son	1905; Bronze; Musée Hyacinthe-Rigaud; More images
Psyche Looking at Love	1906; Marble; Museo Soumaya, Mexico City; 74.7 x 67.1 x 32.9; More images
Bust of Marcellin Berthelot	1906; Bronze; Ny Carlsberg Glyptotek, Copenhagen; More images
Bust of George Bernard Shaw	1906; Bronze; Musée Rodin, Paris; More images
The Cathedral	1908; Bronze; Museo Soumaya, Mexico City; 64 x 29.5 x 31.8; More images
The Tempest	1908; Marble; Metropolitan Museum of Art, New York City; 34.6 x 37.8 x 19.7; More images
La Muse Whistler	1908; Bronze; Musée Rodin, Paris; More images
The Prayer	1909; Bronze; Musée Rodin, Paris; 124.3 x 52.8 x 51.4; More images
Bust of Gustav Mahler	1909; Bronze; Albertinum, Dresden; More images
Thomas Fortune Ryan	1909 to 1910; Bronze; National Gallery of Art, Washington D.C. More images
Standing Female Faun	1910; Marble; Museo Soumaya, Mexico City; 70.1 x 44.7 x 38.4; More images
Head of Camille Claudel	1911; Polychrome glass casting Museo Soumaya, Mexico City; 24 x 13 x 17; More images
Georges Clemenceau	1911; Bronze; Musée de l'Orangerie, Paris; More images
Vaslav Nijinsky	1912; Bronze; Metropolitan Museum of Art, New York City; 17.1 x 7.3 x 6.7; More images
The Gates of Hell	1917 Rodin's death Bronze; Museo Soumaya, Mexico City; 600 x 400 x 100; More images

== Museums ==
- Albertinum, Dresden
- Art Gallery of Western Australia, Perth
- Art Institute of Chicago
- Brooklyn Museum, New York City
- Calouste Gulbenkian Museum, Lisbon
- Cantor Arts Center, Stanford
- Cleveland Museum of Art
- Dallas Museum of Art
- Fin-de-Siècle Museum, Brussels
- Fondation Bemberg, Toulouse
- Jardin des Serres d'Auteuil, Paris
- Kunsthaus Zürich
- Legion of Honor (museum), San Francisco
- Los Angeles County Museum of Art
- Maryhill Museum of Art, State of Washington
- Metropolitan Museum of Art, New York City
- Musée d'arts de Nantes
- Musée d'Orsay, Paris
- Musée de l'Orangerie, Paris
- Musée des Beaux-Arts d'Angers
- Musée des Beaux-Arts de Dijon
- Musée du Luxembourg
- Musée Fabre, Montpellier
- Musée Rodin, Paris
- Museo Nacional de Bellas Artes (Buenos Aires)
- Museum of Fine Arts Bern
- Museum of Fine Arts of Lyon
- Museum of Fine Arts, Reims
- National Gallery (Berlin)
- National Gallery of Art, Washington
- National Museum in Warsaw
- National Museum of Art, Architecture and Design, Oslo
- National Museum of Western Art, Tokyo
- Ny Carlsberg Glyptotek, Copenhagen
- Palais des Beaux-Arts de Lille
- Petit Palais, Paris
- Philadelphia Museum of Art
- Pinacoteca do Estado de São Paulo
- Portland Museum of Art
- Royal Museum of Fine Arts Antwerp
- Rupert Museum, Stellenbosch
- São Paulo Museum of Art
- Soumaya Museum, Mexico City
- Tuileries Garden, Paris

== Media ==
- Bronze
- Glass casting
- Manufacture nationale de Sèvres
- Marble
- Plaster
- Polychrome

== See also ==
- Man with the Broken Nose (1863)
- Alsatian Orphan (1871)
- Suzon (1872–73)
- The Age of Bronze (1876)
- La Defense (1879)
- The Maiden Kissed by the Ghost (1880)
- The Shade (1880)
- The Gates of Hell (1880/1917)
- The Thinker (1880, locations)
- Adam (1880–81)
- Eve (1881)
- Crouching Woman (1880–1882)
- Saint John the Baptist (1880/1907)
- Ugolino and His Sons (1881)
- The Kiss (1882)
- I am beautiful (1882)
- The Falling Man (1882)
- Jules Dalou (1883)
- Bust of Maurice Haquette (1883)
- Bust of Victor Hugo (1883)
- Eternal Springtime (1884)
- Torso of Adele (c. 1884)
- The Burghers of Calais (1884–1889)
- Head of Camille Claudel (1884/1911)
- The Prodigal Son (1885)
- Mask of a Weeping Woman (1885)
- The Martyr (1885)
- Psyche Looking at Love (1885)
- Eustache de Saint Pierre (1885–86)
- Jean d'Aire (1885–86)
- Jean de Fiennes (1885–86)
- Avarice and Lust (1885–1887)
- Damned Women (1885–1890)
- The Old Tree (1885)
- Paolo and Francesca (1885)
- Young Mother (1885)
- Young Mother in the Grotto (1885)
- Young Woman with a Serpent (c. 1885)
- The Three Shades (1886)
- Meditation (1886)
- Fugitive Love (1886–87)
- Ovid's Metamorphoses (1886–1889)
- Pierre de Wiessant (1887)
- Head of Saint John the Baptist (1887)
- The Sirens (1887)
- Polyphemus (1888)
- Standing Mercury (1888)
- The Kneeling Man (1888)
- Adonis Awakens (1889)
- Andromeda (1889)
- Glaucus (1889)
- Kneeling Female Faun (1889)
- The Succubus (1889)
- Despair (c. 1890)
- Brother and Sister (1890)
- Danaid (1890)
- Cybele (1890/1904)
- Monument to Balzac (1892–1897)
- Balzac in the Robe of a Dominican Monk (1892)
- Youth Triumphant (c. 1894)
- Octave Mirdeau (1895)
- Iris, Messenger of the Gods (c.1895)
- Bacchantes Embracing (c. 1896)
- The Spirit of Eternal Repose (1898–99)
- Illusions Received by the Earth (pre-1900)
- The Athlete (1901–1904)
- The Death of Adonis (1903–1906)
- Adam and Eve (1905)
- The Walking Man (1907)
- The Cathedral (1908)
- The Prayer (1909)
- Standing Female Faun (1910)
