= Crouching Woman =

Sculpture by Auguste Rodin

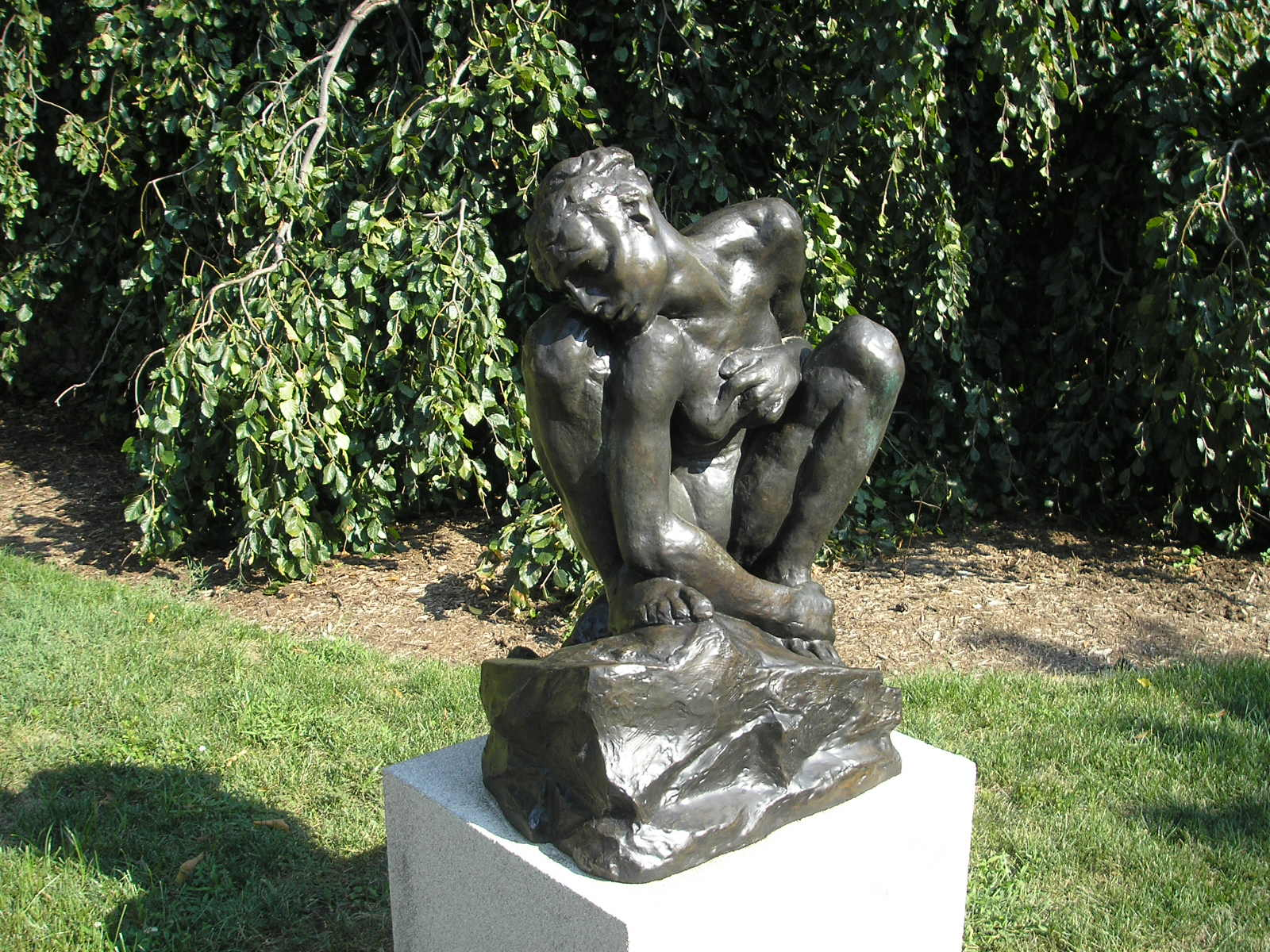
- Sculpture in 2007
- Artist: Auguste Rodin
- Year: 1880–1882
- Type: Bronze
- Dimensions: 95.3 cm × 70.2 cm × 61.6 cm (37 1/2 in × 27 5/8 in × 24 1/4 in)
- Location: Washington, D.C., United States; 38.889094°N 77.023011°W
- Owner: Smithsonian Institution

Crouching Woman is a bronze sculpture by Auguste Rodin.

== Versions ==
Originally modeled in 1880–1882, and enlarged in 1907–1911, it was cast in 1962. It is in the Hirshhorn Museum and Sculpture Garden. The Portland Art Museum has a copy in its Evan H. Roberts Memorial Sculpture Collection.

== See also ==
- List of sculptures by Auguste Rodin
- List of public art in Washington, D.C., Ward 2
