= Suzon (sculpture) =

Sculpture of Auguste Rodin

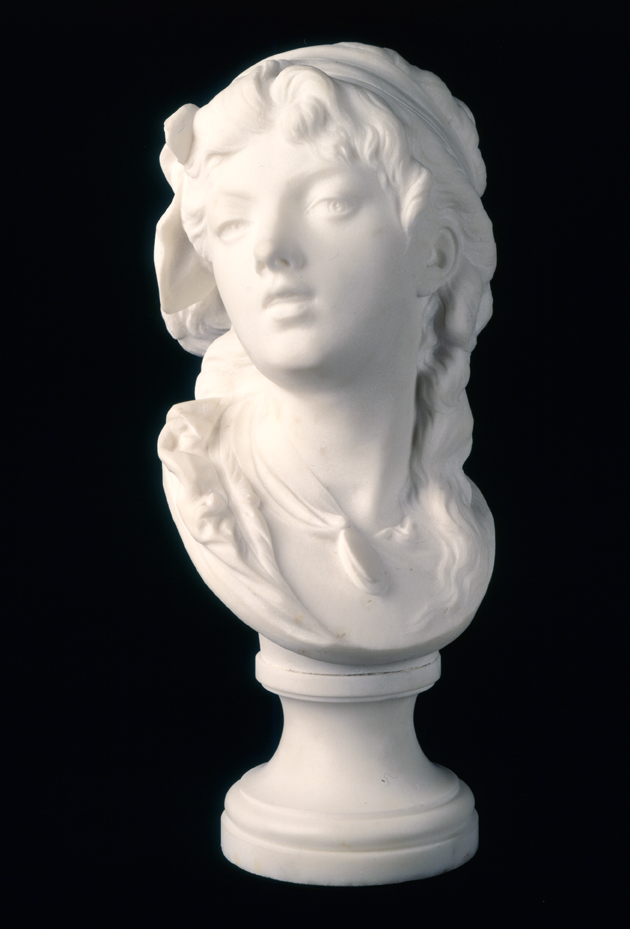
- Suzon in white marble
- Artist: Auguste Rodin
- Year: 1872-1873
- Medium: Plaster; Marble; Sèvres porcelain Bronze
- Location: Museo Soumaya, Mexico City Los Angeles County Museum of Art Brooklyn Museum, New York

Suzon is an early bust of a woman by Auguste Rodin, created between 1872 and 1873 when he wholly worked on commissions. It was inspired by late 18th century Romantic works whilst Rodin was in exile in Brussels due to the Franco-Prussian War. He created it in homage to Albert-Ernest Carrier-Belleuse, another sculptor also in exile there who was highly influential on Rodin's early works.

== Versions ==
He first produced the work in plaster, then in Sevres porcelain and finally in white marble. Later he found himself in financial difficulties and sold the work to the Compagnie des Bronzes in Brussels along with his Dosia. He made them the only company authorised to reproduce the two works, hence the variety of different editions and sizes of the work in public galleries and private collections. After further experimentation Rodin later turned against symmetry in sculpture, stating it had been one of "the sins of my youth".

== See also ==
- List of sculptures by Auguste Rodin
