= Young Mother in the Grotto =

Sculpture by Auguste Rodin

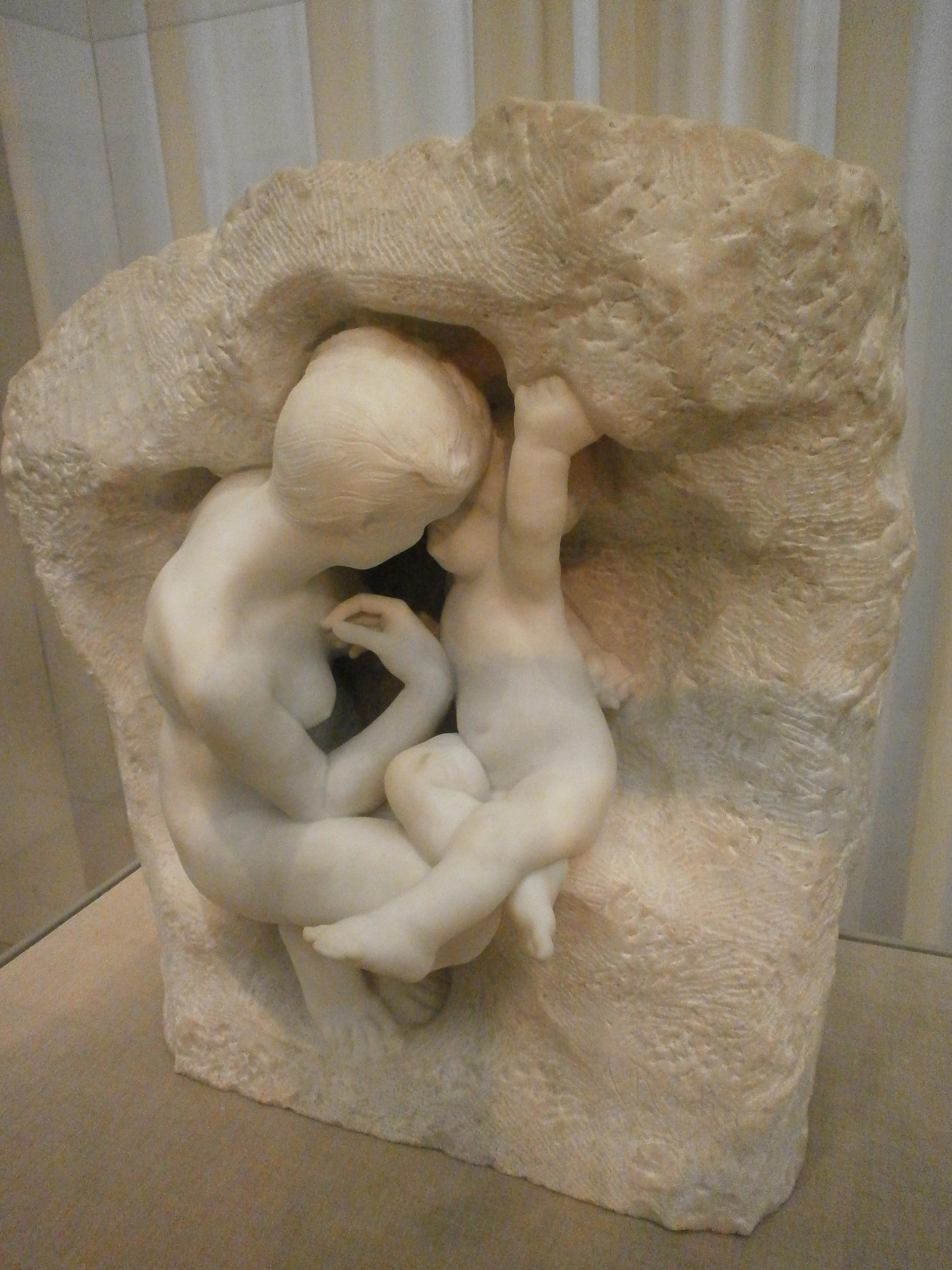
- at Philadelphia Museum of Art
- Artist: Auguste Rodin
- Year: 1885 (conceived) / 1967 (cast)
- Medium: Plaster, later cast in bronze.

Young Mother in the Grotto or Woman and Love is a sculpture by Auguste Rodin, conceived in plaster around 1885. It was first exhibited at the Paris Salon of 1885. John Tweed was very close to Rodin and Young Mother was a strong influence on his 1894 Mother and Child.

== Versions ==
The first versions of the work were made in the 1860s whilst Rodin was working for the Sevres Manufactory. He was allowed to experiment there and explore the possibilities of this work, which culminated in the 1885 piece. Rodin was exploring maternal love at this time, as also seen in Eternal Springtime – both groups originally had a kind of roof which threw them into a deeper shade. That piece also featured on the lower left of the same artist's The Gates of Hell.

Rodin also produced autograph versions of Young Mother in ivory and bronze over the course of his life; these versions were modelled after his wife Rose Beuret and her child Auguste-Eugéne. Rodin contrasts the rough rock with the softness of the figures' skin, evoking a contrast between life and death, with Michelangelo as one of the main influences on the work.

== See also ==
- List of sculptures by Auguste Rodin
