= Camille Claudel 1915 =

2013 film

- Film poster
- Directed by: Bruno Dumont
- Written by: Bruno Dumont
- Produced by: Rachid Bouchareb; Jean Brehat; Muriel Merlin
- Starring: Juliette Binoche
- Cinematography: Guillaume Deffontaines
- Edited by: Bruno Dumont; Basile Belkhiri
- Music by: Johann Sebastian Bach
- Distributed by: ARP Sélection
- Release dates: 12 February 2013 (Berlin); 13 March 2013 (France)
- Running time: 97 minutes
- Country: France
- Language: French

Camille Claudel 1915 is a 2013 French biographical film written and directed by Bruno Dumont. Starring Juliette Binoche, the film premiered in competition at the 63rd Berlin International Film Festival.

== Plot ==
At the end of her career the sculptor Camille Claudel seems to suffer with mental issues. She destroys her own statues and utters repeatedly that her former lover Auguste Rodin intended to make her life miserable.

Consequently, her younger brother Paul sends her to an asylum on the outskirts of Avignon. Claudel tries to convince her doctor she is perfectly sane, while living among patients who obviously are not. She is desperate to see her brother again, hoping he might eventually support her plea to leave the facility.

== Cast ==
- Juliette Binoche as Camille Claudel
- Jean-Luc Vincent as Paul Claudel
- Robert Leroy as the doctor
- Emmanuel Kauffmann as the priest
- Marion Keller as Miss Blanc
- Armelle Leroy-Rolland as the young novice

== Reception ==
Camille Claudel, 1915 has an approval rating of 80% on review aggregator website Rotten Tomatoes, based on 46 reviews, and an average rating of 7.2/10. The website consensus reads: "Camille Claudel, 1915 isn't an easy watch, but Juliette Binoche's excellent performance makes it worth the effort." Metacritic assigned the film a weighted average score of 65 out of 100, based on 16 critics, indicating "generally favourable reviews".

According to Cine Vue's Patrick Gamble, the filmmaker Bruno Dumont has delivered an "incredibly compassionate and humble observation of a tortured artist". Variety's Guy Lodge described the film as a "moving account of a brief period in the later life of the troubled sculptress" and appreciated Juliette Binoche's performance as Camille Claudel as nothing less than "mesmerising". Screen International's Jonathan Romney ranked this film as "an amplification and indeed a deepening" of Dumont's hitherto existing accomplishments and artistic impact. Eric Kohn of IndieWire stated the film had a "concision" which displayed "an exactitude worthy of Robert Bresson". Analysing the film in depth for The Hollywood Reporter, Jordan Mintzer summed up the film in his "bottom line": "An unsettling portrait of the artist as a mad woman, anchored by a riveting lead performance".

== See also ==
- Camille Claudel, 1988 film
- Rodin, 2017 film
