= Camille Claudel (film) =

- Theatrical release poster
- Directed by: Bruno Nuytten
- Written by: Bruno Nuytten; Marilyn Goldin
- Produced by: Isabelle Adjani; Christian Fechner
- Starring: Isabelle Adjani; Gérard Depardieu; Madeleine Robinson; Laurent Grévill; Philippe Clévenot; Katrine Boorman; Roger Planchon; Jean-Pierre Sentier
- Cinematography: Pierre Lhomme
- Edited by: Joëlle Hache; Jeanne Kef
- Music by: Gabriel Yared
- Production companies: Films Christian Fechner; Lilith Films I.A.; Gaumont; Antenne 2 TV France; Films A2; D.D. Productions
- Distributed by: Gaumont Distribution
- Release date: 7 December 1988 (France)
- Running time: 175 minutes
- Country: France
- Language: French
- Box office: $23.7 million

Camille Claudel is a 1988 French biographical drama film about the life of 19th-century sculptor Camille Claudel. The film's screenplay was based on the book by Reine-Marie Paris, granddaughter of Camille's younger brother Paul Claudel, a poet and diplomat.

It was directed by Bruno Nuytten, co-produced by Isabelle Adjani, and starred her and Gérard Depardieu. The film had a total of 2,717,136 admissions in France. Adjani was nominated for the Academy Award for Best Actress for her role, the second in her career.

== Plot ==
The film recounts the life of French sculptor Camille Claudel and her long relationship with the older sculptor Auguste Rodin, with whom she had a common-law marriage. Claudel was the daughter of a devoutly Catholic, socialite mother and a wealthy businessman. Her father encouraged her desire to become an artist and her highly iconoclastic, secular sculpture. Her mother was offended by her choices, including her affair, and deeply disliked her work.

Beginning in the 1880s, when the young Claudel first met Rodin, the film traces the development of their intense romantic and artistic bond. The growth of this relationship coincides with the rise of Claudel's career as she overcomes prejudices against female artists.

However, their romance soon sours due to the increasing pressures of Rodin's fame and his love for another woman. After Claudel's father dies, her mother controls her share of the inheritance and deprives her. These difficulties combine with her failing to get funding and commissions. As she has increasing doubts about the value of her work, Claudel suffers emotional tumult. While her zealot mother wants her institutionalized, her more sympathetic brother tries to comfort her and promote her artwork.

== Cast ==
- Isabelle Adjani as Camille Claudel
- Gérard Depardieu as Auguste Rodin
- Laurent Grévill as Paul Claudel
- Alain Cuny as Louis-Prosper Claudel
- Madeleine Robinson as Louise-Athanaïse Claudel
- Philippe Clévenot as Eugène Blot
- Katrine Boorman as Jessie Lipscomb
- Maxime Leroux as Claude Debussy
- Danièle Lebrun as Rose Beuret
- François Berléand as Doctor Michaux

== Production ==
Principal photography began on 14 September 1987.

== Reception ==
=== Critical response ===
On Rotten Tomatoes, the film has an aggregated score of 92% based on 12 reviews, and an average rating of 8.4/10.

Reviewing the Orion Home Video release in 1990, Randy Pitman gave the film three out of five, describing it as "lavish" and "stately paced" but "a strangely subdued, almost hollow, film", while judging that its cinematography, subtitling and easy-to-follow structure made it "one of the most accessible foreign films for general patrons available". James Travers of Frenchfilms.org called it "a languorous, intense work which many spectators will find slow-moving and stifling", with "pretty respectable (but not great) performances" from Adjani and Depardieu; he wrote that Nuytten used the camera to create mood "masterfully" but did not compensate for "the lack of realism in Adjani's somewhat theatrical portrayal", and called the film "possibly a flawed masterpiece". Reviewing Umbrella Entertainment's DVD release in 2018, Natalie Salvo of Impulse Gamer called it "a detailed and uneven film" and wrote that Adjani "does an excellent job", while noting that the release had not been restored.

=== Awards ===
- 1990 – nominated for two Academy Awards
  - Academy Award for Best Actress
  - Academy Award for Best Foreign Language Film
- 1989 – received five César Awards, including Best Film and Best Actress
- 1989 – Isabelle Adjani received the Silver Bear for Best Actress at the 39th Berlin International Film Festival

== See also ==
- Camille Claudel 1915, 2013 film
- Rodin, 2017 film
- List of submissions to the 62nd Academy Awards for Best Foreign Language Film
- List of French submissions for the Academy Award for Best Foreign Language Film
- Mental illness in films
