= Rodin (film) =

2017 film

- Film poster
- Directed by: Jacques Doillon
- Written by: Jacques Doillon
- Produced by: Kristina Larsen
- Starring: Vincent Lindon
- Cinematography: Christophe Beaucarne
- Edited by: Frédéric Fichefet
- Music by: Philippe Sarde
- Distributed by: Wild Bunch Distribution
- Release dates: 24 May 2017 (Cannes); 24 May 2017 (France)
- Running time: 119 minutes
- Countries: France; Belgium
- Language: French

Rodin is a 2017 drama film directed by Jacques Doillon. It was selected to compete for the Palme d'Or in the main competition section at the 2017 Cannes Film Festival. The film has generally negative reviews from the major review aggregators.

== Plot ==
Auguste Rodin has become among the most celebrated sculptors in the world at the turn of the century and continues to win commissions for major sculptures such as Monument to Balzac, The Kiss, The Burghers of Calais, and The Gates of Hell. His career has progressed to the point where he keeps a major studio operating with multiple students and many models constantly in the studio as he progresses on his current projects. Though a significant success artistically, Rodin's personal life has suffered setbacks. His relationship with his wife has become colder over the years and Rodin takes up a relationship with a younger female sculptor who fills an emotional emptiness which he experiences with his wife.

Rodin goes to visit Honore Balzac to discuss making a life-size sculpture of the prominent French author. His original conception is to see the author as a primal literary figure whom he envisions as standing in a heroic posture and in the nude. As his conceptual drawings for the sculpture progress, Rodin then takes up the preliminary design of the molding structures which will support the sculpture which will grow to its full size as it progresses toward completion. Rodin does not have the benefit of Balzac as a live model for the sculpture and relies on a pregnant model posing in the nude in the heroic pose which Rodin wished to use for the sculpture. Rodin uses the increased mass of the pregnancy to mimick the somewhat oversized girth which Balzac's overweight figure obtained in older age. Meanwhile, his female sculpture assistant, Camille Claudel, confronts him about the prospects of their relationship which has become explicitly intimate, and Rodin tells her that she occupies an unrivaled place in his affections. She confronts him in order for him to sign a paper stating his intentions to leave his wife and marry her which Rodin agrees to do and signs before her eyes.

Rodin's wife is conscious of the fact that her husband is less than faithful and that their relationship has grown colder with the years and with her rapidly diminishing attractiveness and loss of youth. Rodin is uncommunicative about the issue and feels that he should live as if in an open marriage. He continues his relationship with the female sculptor and his wife begins to gather information about his mistress apparently with a mind to confronting her about the realities of Rodin's personal life and family. When the Balzac statue reaches its subsequent stages of completion, Rodin calls the commissioning parties to do a preliminary review of the statue. Their response is unanimously negative and stark in its disapproval. Before them they see an oversized and almost grotesquely obese version of the celebrated French author. The commissioning parties are especially disturbed by the prominently featured male organs which Rodin spent special effort to prominently display. There is no question left in the mind of the reviewers that the statue is to be fully rejected as both poorly conceived by Balzac and poorly executed. Balzac is deeply disturbed by the review though he remains silent through much of the criticism.

His wife has discovered the address of where Balzac's female sculptor friend is staying and goes to confront her. The meeting sours very quickly with verbal animosity overcoming both the wife and the mistress as they try to face each other down. They part company in a high state of distress, and Rodin's mistress then later confronts Rodin about his promises to her about starting a new life with her and leaving his wife. Rodin contemplates for a further moment and states that an ultimatum at this time does not work him or for his career and he decides that they must part ways. Although Rodin remains profligate in his sexual openness with his other models, he still nonetheless at least partially reconciles with his wife and the two continue to make their home together.

Rodin's contemplation about the Balzac statue has been ponderous and one day in his studio he gets help from one of his students to immerse an oversized men's overcoat into a clay bath in order to fully drench it in the wet composite of clay in order to prepare its application. Rodin decides that he will apply the wet clay overcoat by draping over the shoulders of the nude Balzac statue, thereby covering the original nudity of the preliminary pose of the statue and fully covering over the nude male organs which had offended the commissioning parties at the time of the first review. He allows the draped coat to dry and the completed statue takes its final form which he keeps in his country garden in his home outside of town away from his studio. As the film ends, the statue is seen years later in Japan where it is displayed in the Museum of the Open Air (Hakone Open-Air Museum) for the public to contemplate and admire.

== Cast ==
- Vincent Lindon as Auguste Rodin
- Izïa Higelin as Camille Claudel
- Séverine Caneele as Rose Beuret
- Bernard Verley as Victor Hugo
- Anders Danielsen Lie as Rainer Maria Rilke
- Arthur Nauzyciel as Paul Cézanne
- Laurent Poitrenaux as Octave Mirbeau
- Olivier Cadiot as Claude Monet
- Edward Akrout as Edward Steichen

== Production ==
Principal photography began in Chartres on 23 May 2016. Filming also took place in the sculptor's real home in Meudon, the Villa des Brillants.

== Reception ==
On review aggregator Rotten Tomatoes, the film holds an approval rating of 32%, based on 41 reviews with an average rating of 4.8/10. The website's critical consensus states, "Rodin falls prey to the most common pitfall of artist biopics: depicting creative work without ever really unlocking what it means or why it's important." Metacritic gives the film a weighted average score of 39 out of 100, based on 14 critics, indicating "generally unfavorable reviews".

== See also ==
- Camille Claudel, 1988 film
- Camille Claudel 1915, 2013 film
