= Saint John the Baptist (Rodin) =

Sculpture by Auguste Rodin

Saint John the Baptist (preaching)
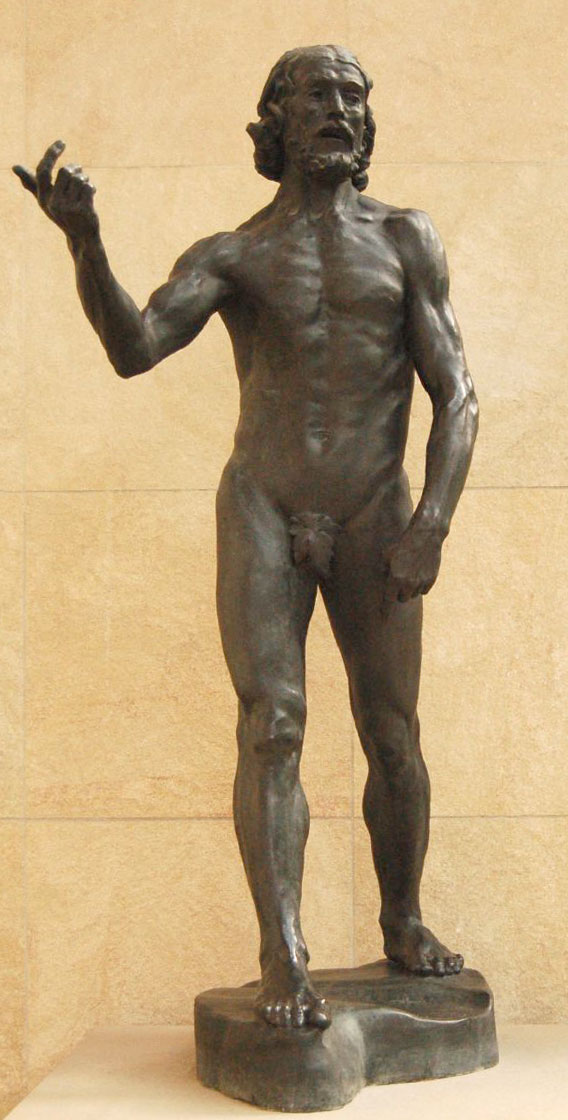
- at the Musée d'Orsay
- Artist: Auguste Rodin
- Year: 1877
- Type: Sculpture
- Medium: Bronze
- Dimensions: 204 cm × 63 cm × 113 cm (80 in × 25 in × 44 in)

Saint John the Baptist (preaching) is a bronze sculpture, by Auguste Rodin.

After the controversy of his Age of Bronze, Rodin began modeling the larger than life figure in 1877. He showed a plaster model at the Salon of 1880.

Rodin described to Dujardin-Beaumetz 1913 how he was inspired to create this sculpture by an Italian peasant named Pignatelli.

As soon as I saw him, I was filled with admiration; this rough, hairy man expressed violence in his bearing… yet also the mystical character of his race. I immediately thought of a Saint John the Baptist, in other words, a man of nature, a visionary, a believer, a precursor who came to announce one greater than himself. The peasant undressed, planted himself firmly on his feet, head up, torso straight, at the same time putting his weight on both legs, open like a compass. The movement was so right, so straightforward and so true that I cried: ‘But it’s a man walking!’ I immediately resolved to model what I had seen.

== Versions ==
Reduced size examples were cast between 1878 and 1907. The Walking Man is a version of the figure without the head and arms.

Examples are in the collections of: Musée d'Orsay, Musée du Luxembourg, Musée Rodin, the Tate Museum, Victoria and Albert Museum, the Metropolitan Museum of Art, the Norton Simon Museum, California Palace of the Legion of Honor, the Glenkiln Sculpture Park, and the Saint Louis Art Museum.

== See also ==
- List of sculptures by Auguste Rodin
