= Rose Beuret =

Auguste Rodin's partner

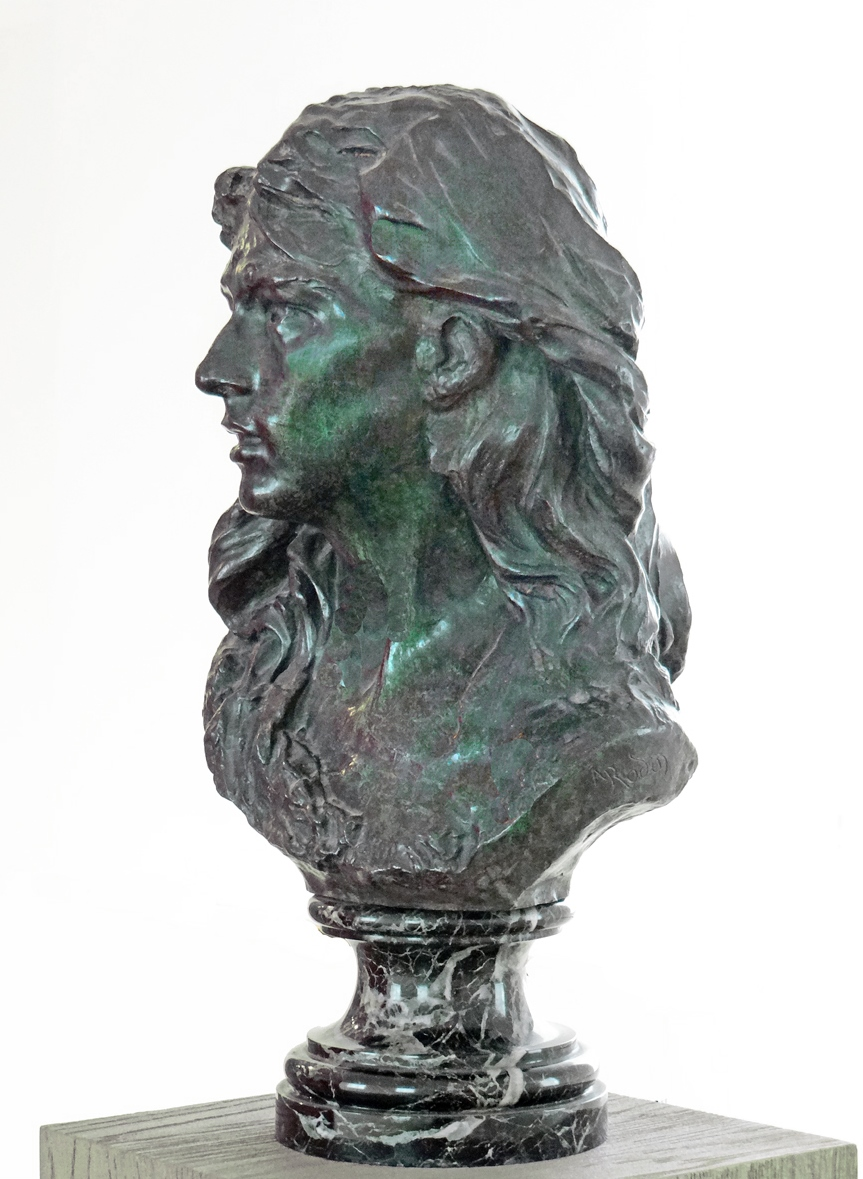
- Mignon or Portrait of Rose Beuret, sculpture by Auguste Rodin (1870, Musée des Beaux-Arts d'Angers)
- Born: Marie Rose Beuret; 9 June 1844; Vecqueville (Haute-Marne), France
- Died: 14 February 1917 (aged 72); Meudon, France
- Burial place: Villa des Brillants
- Occupations: Seamstress, model
- Spouse: Auguste Rodin (m. 1917)

Rose Beuret (French pronunciation: [ʁoz bøʁɛ]; born Marie Rose Beuret; 9 June 1844 – 14 February 1917) was a French seamstress and laundress, known to have been a model for, and for 53 years, the companion of Auguste Rodin, whom she married just weeks before her death in 1917.

== Biography ==
Beuret was born to Scholastique Clausse and Etienne Beuret, a farmer and winemaker from Haute-Marne. Beuret met Rodin in 1864 while he was working on the pediment of the Théâtre des Gobelins.

Rose Beuret was a reserved and shy woman. Rodin was a serious and hard-working man, rustic in his manners and as shy as herself. They moved in together and continued their work, he as a sculptor and she as a seamstress. Beuret took care of the household work and Rodin sometimes helped her sew on buttons. On Sundays, the young lovers took long walks in the woods and the countryside near Paris.

In 1893, Rodin moved with her to Meudon, at No. 8 Scribe Road, in the House of Chiens-Loups.

Beuret gradually became Rodin's faithful companion. She assisted him in the projection and organization of his workshop and posed for him on several occasions. They had a son, Auguste-Eugène Beuret (1866–1934), whom the artist did not recognize. The son also served as a model for Rodin (Mignon, Bellone, L 'Alsacienne) and as a workshop boy. However, their relationship deteriorated during his career as a sculptor.

Despite Rodin having had numerous liaisons (Camille Claudel, Gwen John, and the American-born Duchesse de Choiseul, from 1907 to 1912), the two married on 29 January 1917 in Meudon, sixteen days before her death.

Beuret was Rodin's model several times: in Jeune fille au chapeau fleuri in 1865, Mignon in 1869–1870; Bellone, executed in 1878 after his return from Belgium; and for a 1898 mask.

== Filmography ==
Danièle Lebrun plays Beuret in Camille Claudel (1988). Séverine Caneele portrays her in Rodin (2017).

== Gallery ==
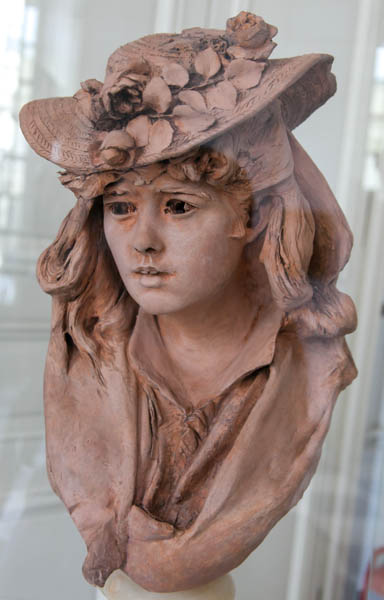
Jeune Fille au chapeau fleuri, 1865

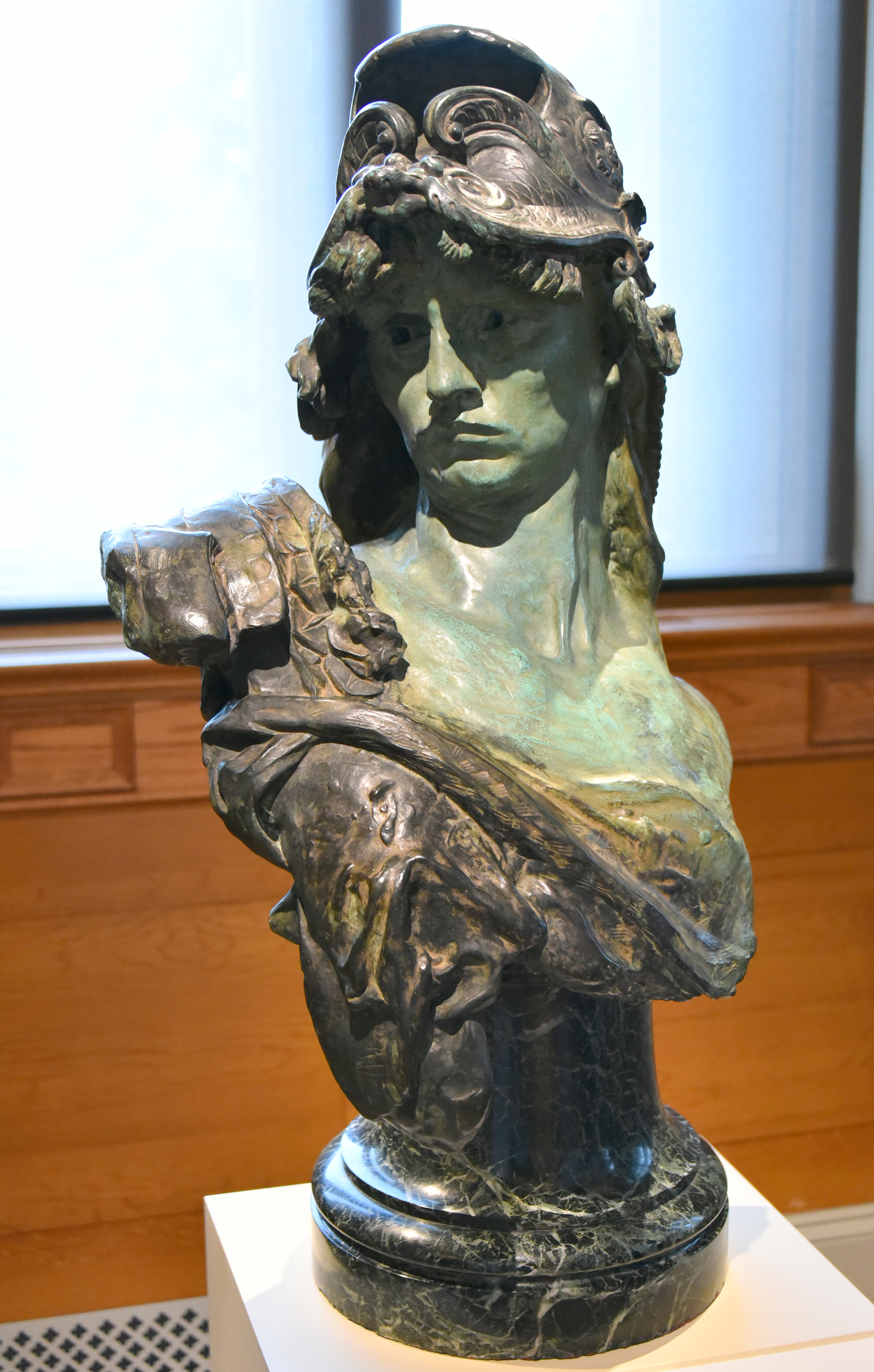
Bellone, 1879

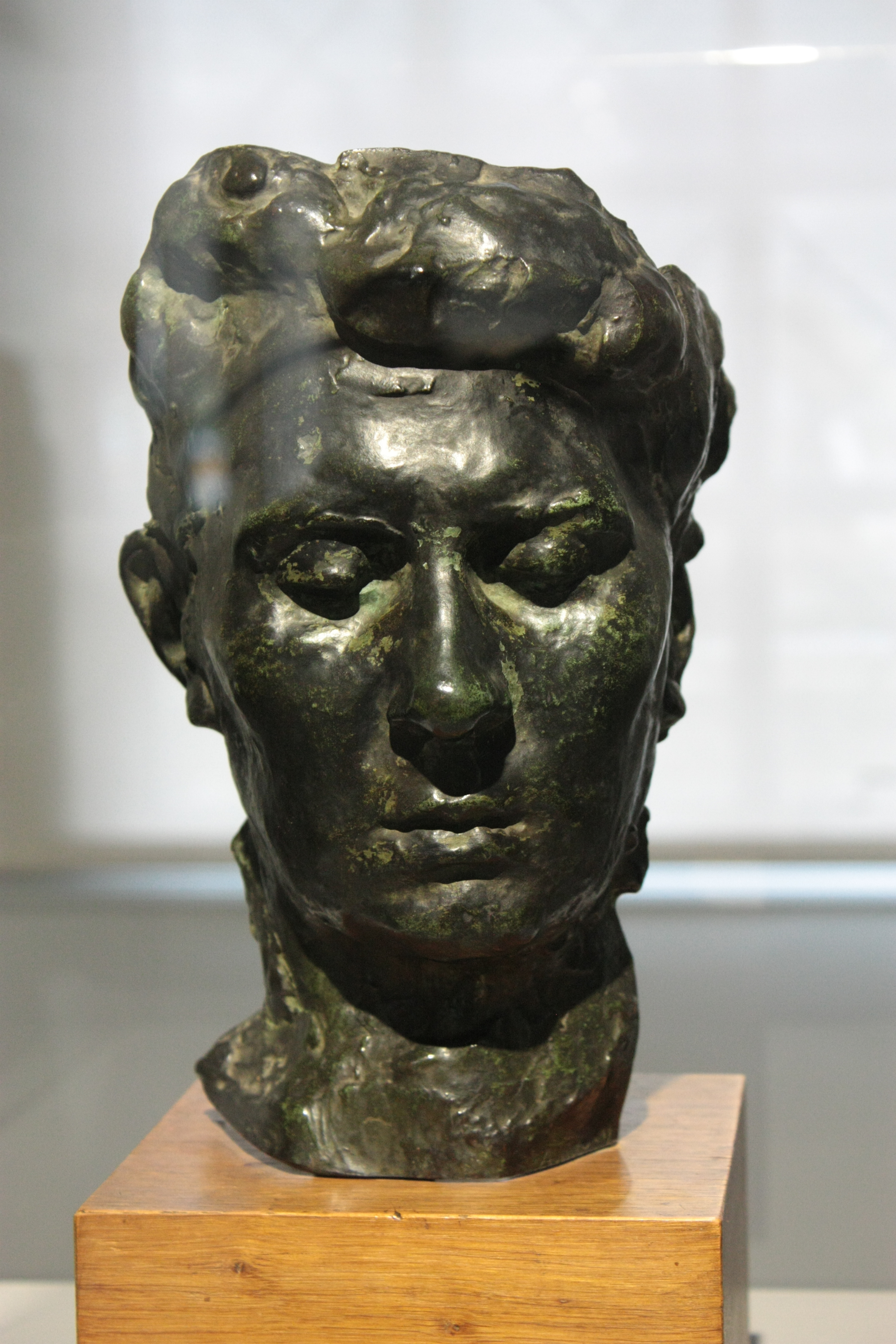
Rose Beuret bust, 1880

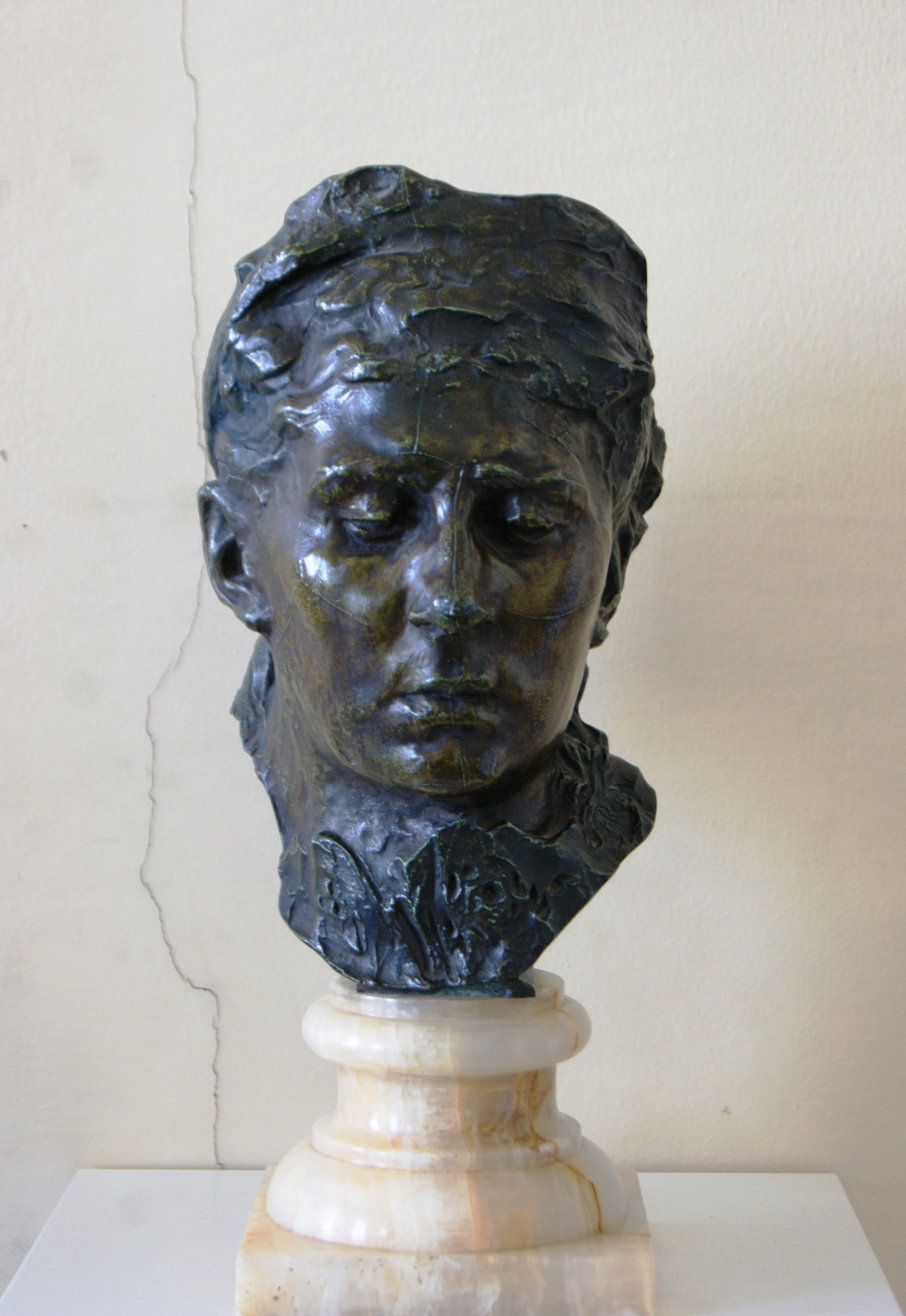
Masque de L'Alsacienne, 1880–1882

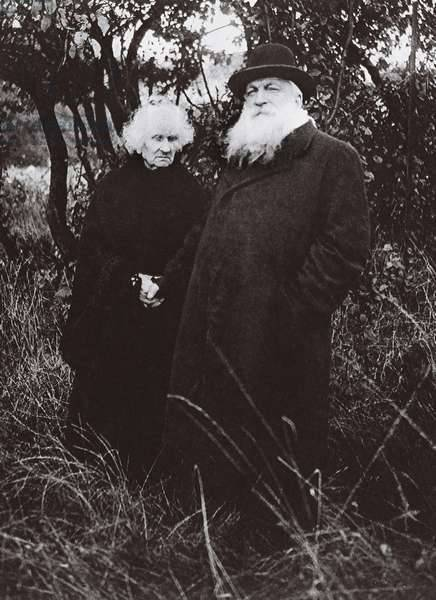
Beuret and Rodin in their Meudon garden, 1916
