= Auguste Rodin =

French sculptor (1840–1917)

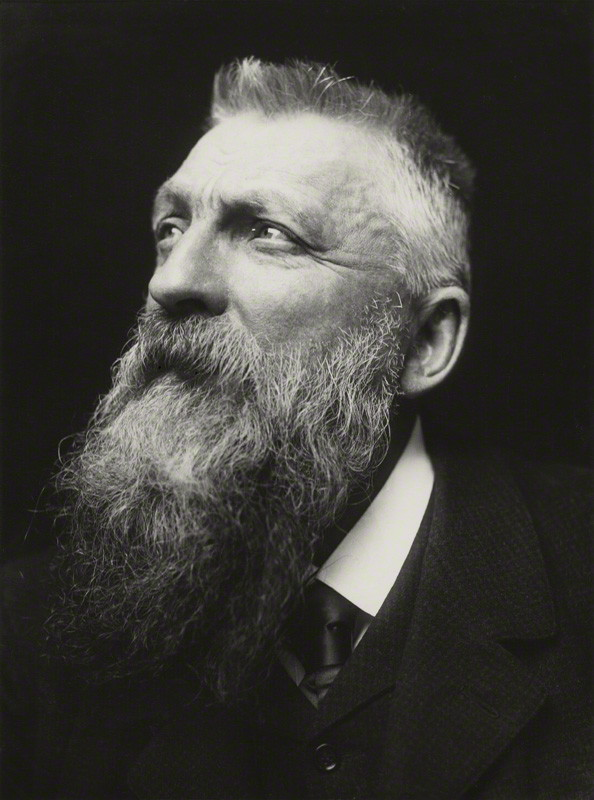
- Portrait photograph by George Charles Beresford, 1902
- Born: François Auguste René Rodin; 12 November 1840; Paris, France
- Died: 17 November 1917 (aged 77); Meudon, France
- Resting place: Villa des Brillants, Meudon
- Known for: Sculpture and drawing
- Notable work: The Age of Bronze (L'age d'airain), 1877; The Walking Man (L'homme qui marche), 1877–78; The Burghers of Calais (Les Bourgeois de Calais), 1889; The Kiss (Le Baiser), 1889; The Thinker (Le Penseur), 1902; The Gates of Hell (La Porte de l'Enfer), 1917
- Spouse: Rose Beuret (m. 1917; died 1917)
- Awards: Grand Cross of the Legion of Honour

François Auguste René Rodin (/roʊˈdæn/; French: [fʁɑ̃swa oɡyst(ə) ʁəne ʁɔdɛ̃]; 12 November 1840 – 17 November 1917) was a French sculptor considered a founder of modern sculpture. Rejected three times from the prestigious École des Beaux Arts, Rodin trained at an applied arts school in Paris and in various studios and workshops before gaining public attention and individual commissions in his late 30s. Rodin is known for the boldly expressive, emotive physicality of his sculptures including Monument to Balzac, The Kiss, The Burghers of Calais, and The Gates of Hell, a sculptural composition that includes a figure later known as The Thinker.

Many of Rodin's sculptures were criticized as unfinished or fragmented and because his work departed from traditional themes of mythology and allegory. Although Rodin was sensitive to the controversy surrounding his work, he refused to change his style, and his continued output brought increasing favor from the government and the artistic community.

From the unexpected naturalism of Rodin's first major figure – inspired by his 1875 trip to Italy – to the unconventional memorials whose commissions he later sought, his reputation grew, and Rodin became the preeminent French sculptor of his time. By 1900, he was a world-renowned artist. Wealthy private clients sought Rodin's work after his World's Fair exhibit, and he kept company with a variety of high-profile intellectuals and artists. His student, Camille Claudel, became his associate, lover, and creative rival. Rodin's other students included Antoine Bourdelle, Constantin Brâncuși, and Charles Despiau. He married his lifelong companion, Rose Beuret, in the last year of both their lives. His sculptures suffered a decline in popularity after his death in 1917, but within a few decades his legacy solidified. Rodin remains one of the few sculptors widely known outside the visual arts community.

== Biography ==
=== Formative years ===
Rodin was born on 12 November 1840 into a working-class family in Paris, the second child of Marie Cheffer and Jean-Baptiste Rodin, who was a police department clerk. He was largely self-educated, and began to draw at age 10. Between ages 14 and 17, he attended the Petite École, a school specializing in art and mathematics where he studied drawing and painting. His drawing teacher Horace Lecoq de Boisbaudran believed in first developing the personality of his students so that they observed with their own eyes and drew from their recollections, and Rodin expressed appreciation for his teacher much later in life. It was at Lecoq's studio that he met Jules Dalou and Alphonse Legros.

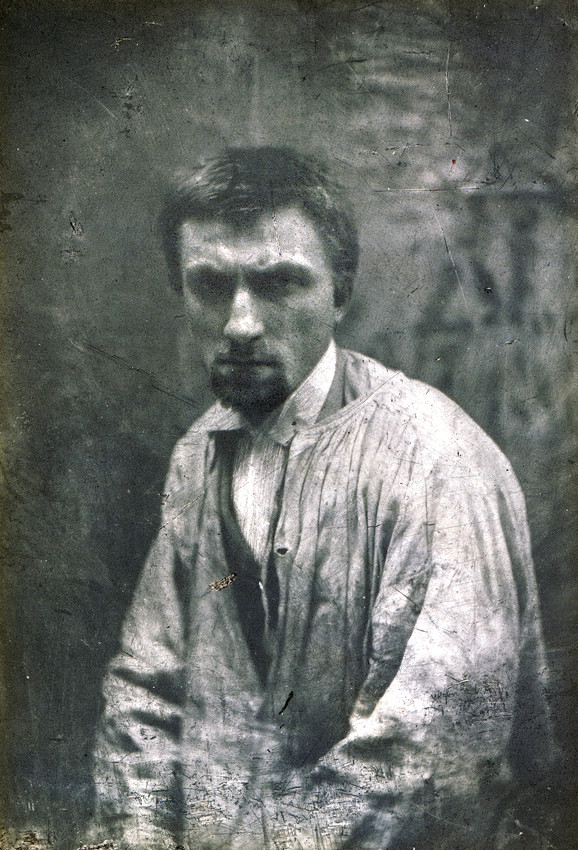
Rodin c. 1862

In 1857, Rodin submitted a clay model of a companion to the École des Beaux-Arts in an attempt to win entrance; he did not succeed, and two further applications were also denied. Entrance requirements were not particularly high at the Grande École, so the rejections were considerable setbacks. Rodin's inability to gain entrance may have been due to the judges' Neoclassical tastes, while Rodin had been schooled in light, 18th-century sculpture. He left the Petite École in 1857 and earned a living as a craftsman and ornamenter for most of the next two decades, producing decorative objects and architectural embellishments.

Rodin's sister Maria, two years his senior, died of peritonitis in a convent in 1862, and Rodin was anguished with guilt because he had introduced her to an unfaithful suitor. He turned away from art and joined the Catholic order of the Congregation of the Blessed Sacrament as a laybrother. Father (later Saint) Peter Julian Eymard, founder and head of the congregation, recognized Rodin's talent and sensed his lack of suitability for the order. He encouraged Rodin to continue with sculpture, offering the order's garden shed as a studio to aid his transition back to life outside the church. In 1863, before he left the order, Rodin produced his first clearly datable work, a bust of Eymard, in thanks for the priest's counsel and support. Eymard, conscious of anticlerical sentiment, felt the coiffed hair and widow's peak suggested 'the horns of the devil' and asked Rodin to alter the bust. Rodin refused, and the order hid Eymard's copy of the bust away. Today the congregation holds a more positive view, and displays casts in order houses throughout the world. Rodin returned that same year to work as a decorator while taking classes with animal sculptor Antoine-Louis Barye. The teacher's attention to detail and his finely rendered musculature of animals in motion significantly influenced Rodin.

In 1864, Rodin began to live with a young seamstress named Rose Beuret (born in June 1844), with whom he stayed for the rest of his life, with varying commitment. The couple had a son named Auguste-Eugène Beuret (1866–1934). That year, Rodin offered his first sculpture for exhibition and entered the studio of Albert-Ernest Carrier-Belleuse, a successful mass producer of objets d'art. Rodin worked as Carrier-Belleuse' chief assistant until 1870, designing roof decorations and staircase and doorway embellishments. With the arrival of the Franco-Prussian War, Rodin was called to serve in the French National Guard, but his service was brief due to his near-sightedness. Decorators' work had dwindled because of the war, yet Rodin needed to support his family, as poverty was a continual difficulty for him until about the age of 30. Carrier-Belleuse soon asked him to join him in Belgium, where they worked on ornamentation for the Bourse Palace in Brussels in 1871.

Rodin planned to stay in Belgium a few months, but he spent the next six years outside of France. It was a pivotal time in his life. He had acquired skill and experience as a craftsman, but no one had yet seen his art, which sat in his workshop since he could not afford castings. His relationship with Carrier-Belleuse had deteriorated, but he found other employment in Brussels, displaying some works at salons, and his companion Rose soon joined him there. Having saved enough money to travel, Rodin visited Italy for two months in 1875, where he was drawn to the work of Donatello and Michelangelo. Their work had a profound effect on his artistic direction. Rodin said, "It is Michelangelo who has freed me from academic sculpture." Returning to Belgium, he began work on The Age of Bronze, a life-size male figure whose naturalism brought Rodin attention but led to accusations of sculptural cheating – its naturalism and scale was such that critics alleged he had cast the work from a living model. Much of Rodin's later work was explicitly larger or smaller than life, in part to demonstrate the folly of such accusations.

=== Artistic independence ===
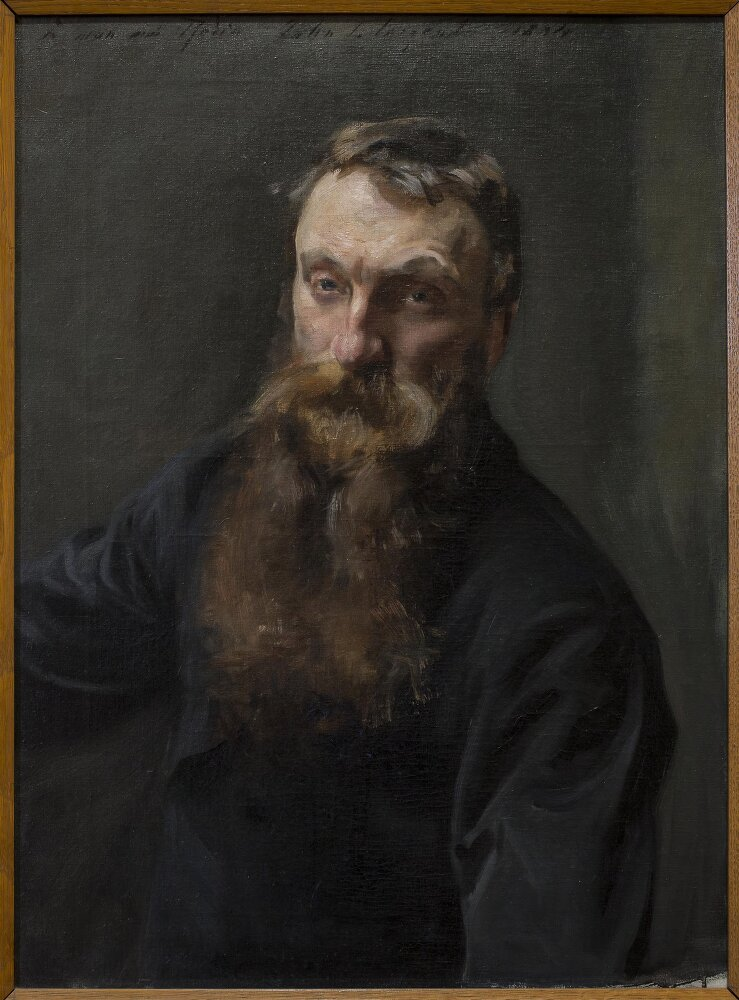
Auguste Rodin, John Singer Sargent, 1884

Rose Beuret and Rodin returned to Paris in 1877, moving into a small flat on the Left Bank. Misfortune surrounded Rodin: his mother, who had wanted to see her son marry, was dead, and his father was blind and senile, cared for by Rodin's sister-in-law, Aunt Thérèse. Rodin's eleven-year-old son Auguste, possibly developmentally delayed, was also in the ever-helpful Thérèse's care. Rodin had essentially abandoned his son for six years, and would have a very limited relationship with him throughout his life. Father and son joined the couple in their flat, with Rose as caretaker. Charges of fakery surrounding The Age of Bronze continued. Rodin increasingly sought soothing female companionship in Paris, and Rose stayed in the background.

Rodin earned his living collaborating with more established sculptors on public commissions, primarily memorials and neo-baroque architectural pieces in the style of Carpeaux. In competitions for commissions he submitted models of Denis Diderot, Jean-Jacques Rousseau, and Lazare Carnot, all to no avail. On his own time, he worked on studies leading to the creation of his next important work, St. John the Baptist Preaching.

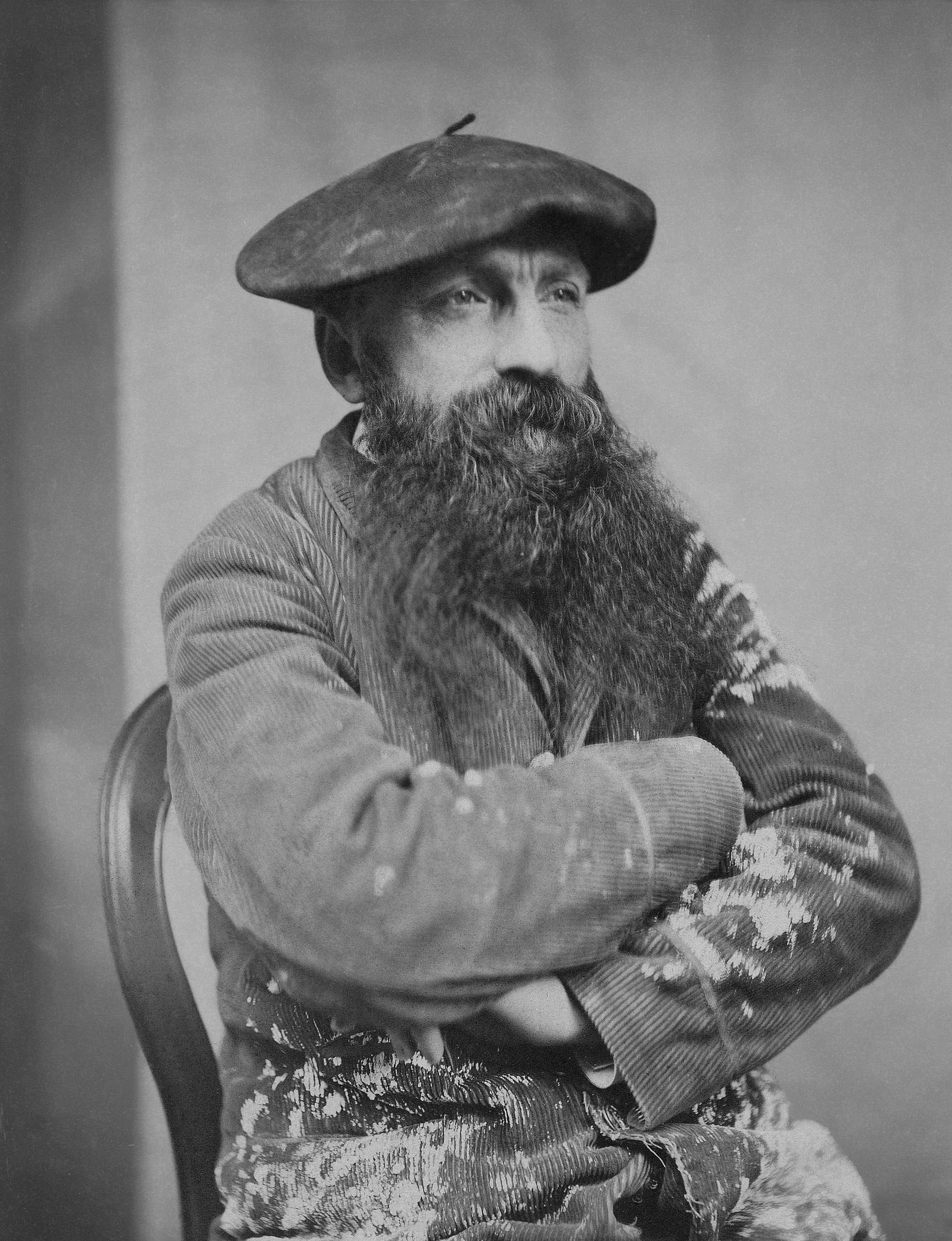
Rodin, c. 1875–1880

In 1880, Carrier-Belleuse, then art director of the Sèvres national porcelain factory, offered Rodin a part-time position as a designer. Rodin accepted and made designs for vases and table ornaments that brought the factory renown across Europe.

The artistic community appreciated his work and Rodin was invited to Paris Salons by friends like writer Léon Cladel. During his early appearances at these social events, Rodin seemed shy; French statesman Leon Gambetta expressed a desire to meet Rodin, and the sculptor impressed him when they met at a salon. Gambetta spoke of Rodin in turn to several government ministers, likely including Edmund Turquet, the Undersecretary of the Ministry of Fine Arts, whom Rodin eventually met.

Through Turquet, Rodin won a 1880 commission to create a portal for a planned museum of decorative arts. Rodin dedicated much of the next four decades to his elaborate Gates of Hell, an unfinished portal for a museum that was never built. Many of the portal's figures became sculptures in themselves, including Rodin's most famous, The Thinker and The Kiss. With the museum commission came a free studio, granting Rodin a new level of artistic freedom. Soon, he stopped working at the porcelain factory in 1882; his income came from private commissions.

In 1883, Rodin agreed to supervise a course for sculptor Alfred Boucher in his absence, where he met the 18-year-old Camille Claudel. The two formed a passionate but stormy relationship and influenced each other artistically. Claudel inspired Rodin as a model for many of his figures, and she was a talented sculptor, assisting him on commissions as well as creating her own works. Her Bust of Rodin was displayed to critical acclaim at the 1892 Salon.

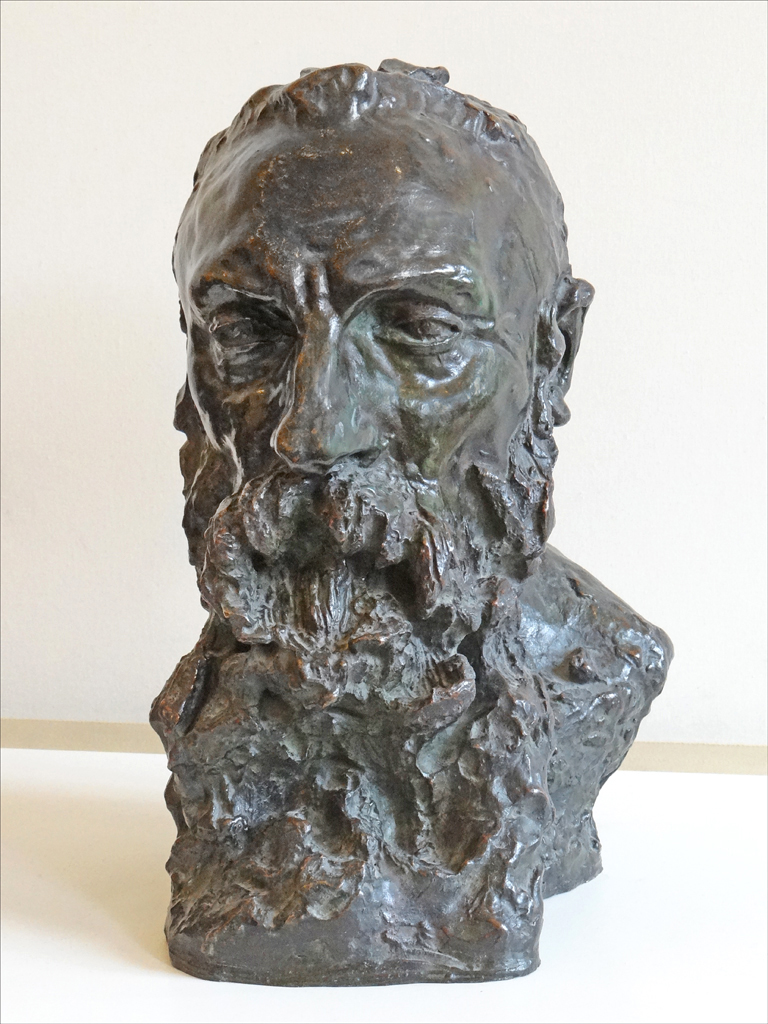
Bust of Rodin (1888–89) by Camille Claudel

Although busy with The Gates of Hell, Rodin won other commissions. He pursued an opportunity to create a historical monument for the town of Calais. For a monument to French author Honoré de Balzac, Rodin was chosen in 1891. His execution of both sculptures clashed with traditional tastes and met with varying degrees of disapproval from the organizations that sponsored the commissions. Still, Rodin was gaining support from diverse sources that propelled him toward fame.

In 1889, the Paris Salon invited Rodin to be a judge on its artistic jury. Though Rodin's career was on the rise, Claudel and Beuret were becoming increasingly impatient with Rodin's "double life". Claudel and Rodin shared an atelier at a small old castle (the Château de l'Islette in the Loire), but Rodin refused to relinquish his ties to Beuret, his loyal companion during the lean years, and mother of his son. During one absence, Rodin wrote to Beuret, "I think of how much you must have loved me to put up with my caprices ... I remain, in all tenderness, your Rodin."

In 1893-1894, Rodin was noted as writing to the anarchist and sculptor Appoline Schrader by the French police when they raided her home.

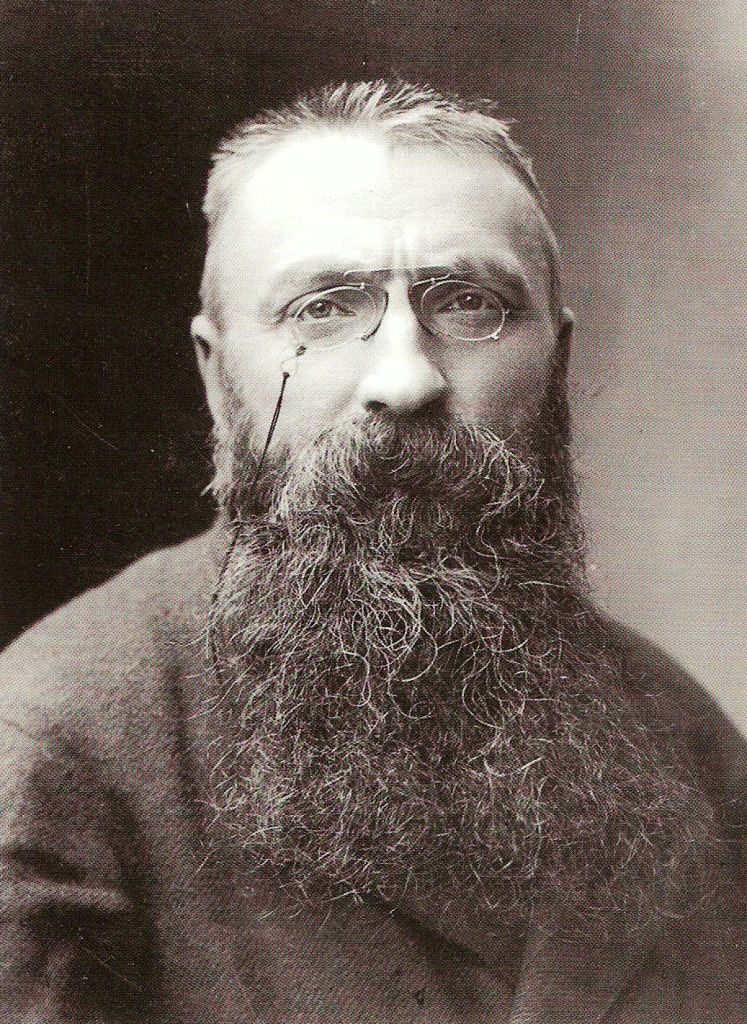
A photograph of Rodin in 1891 by Nadar

Claudel and Rodin parted in 1898. Claudel suffered an alleged nervous breakdown several years later and was confined to an institution for 30 years by her family, until her death in 1943, despite numerous attempts by doctors to explain to her mother and brother that she was sane.

In 1904, Rodin was introduced to the Welsh artist, Gwen John, who modelled for him and became his lover after being introduced by student and assistant Hilda Flodin. John had a fervent attachment to Rodin and would write to him thousands of times over the next ten years. As their relationship came to a close, despite his genuine feeling for her, Rodin eventually resorted to the use of concièrges and secretaries to keep her at a distance.

== Works ==
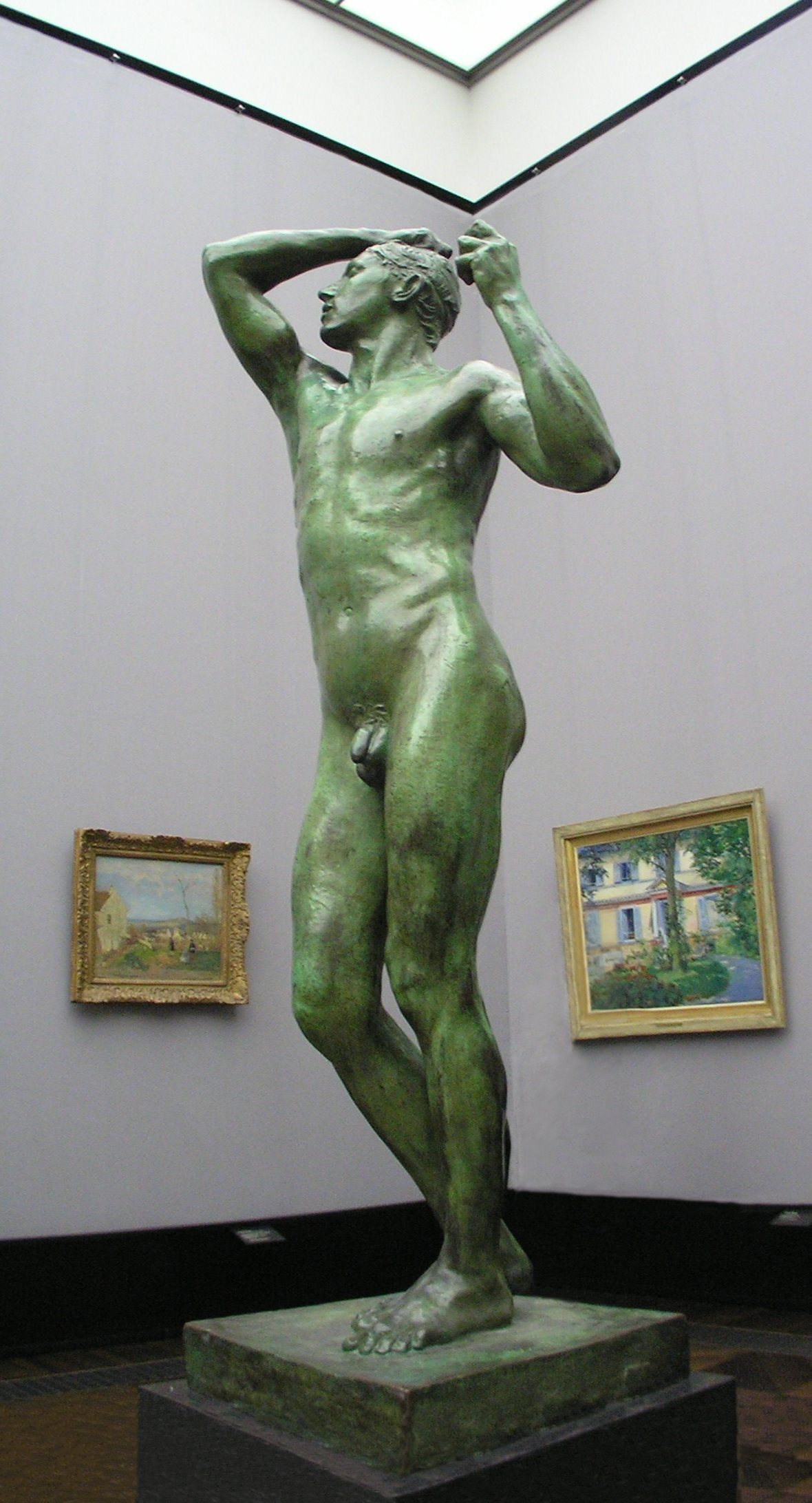
The Age of Bronze (1877)

In 1864, Rodin submitted his first sculpture for exhibition, The Man with the Broken Nose, to the Paris Salon. The subject was an elderly neighborhood street porter. The unconventional bronze piece was not a traditional bust, but instead the head was "broken off" at the neck, the nose was flattened and crooked, and the back of the head was absent, having fallen off the clay model in an accident. The work emphasized texture and the emotional state of the subject; it illustrated the "unfinishedness" that would characterize many of Rodin's later sculptures. The Salon initially rejected the piece, though it would accept a version carved in marble by an assistant of Rodin's in 1875.

=== Early figures: the inspiration of Italy ===
In Brussels, Rodin created his first full-scale work, The Age of Bronze, having returned from Italy. Modeled after a Belgian soldier, the figure drew inspiration from Michelangelo's Dying Slave, which Rodin had observed at the Louvre. Attempting to combine Michelangelo's mastery of the human form with his own sense of human nature, Rodin studied his model from all angles, at rest and in motion; he mounted a ladder for additional perspective, and made clay models, which he studied by candlelight. The result was a life-size, well-proportioned nude figure, posed unconventionally with his right hand atop his head, and his left arm held out at his side, forearm parallel to the body.

In 1877, the work debuted in Brussels and then was shown at the Paris Salon. The statue's apparent lack of a theme was troubling to critics – commemorating neither mythology nor a noble historical event – and it is not clear whether Rodin intended a theme. He first titled the work The Vanquished, in which form the left hand held a spear, but he removed the spear because it obstructed the torso from certain angles. After two more intermediary titles, Rodin settled on The Age of Bronze, suggesting the Bronze Age, and in Rodin's words, "man arising from nature". Later, however, Rodin said that he had had in mind "just a simple piece of sculpture without reference to subject".

Its mastery of form, light, and shadow made the work look so naturalistic that Rodin was accused of surmoulage – having taken a cast from a living model. Rodin vigorously denied the charges, writing to newspapers and having photographs taken of the model to prove how the sculpture differed. He demanded an inquiry and was eventually exonerated by a committee of sculptors. Leaving aside the false charges, the piece polarized critics. It had barely won acceptance for display at the Paris Salon, and criticism likened it to "a statue of a sleepwalker" and called it "an astonishingly accurate copy of a low type". Others rallied to defend the piece and Rodin's integrity. The government minister Turquet admired the piece, and The Age of Bronze was purchased by the state for 2,200 francs – what it had cost Rodin to have it cast in bronze.

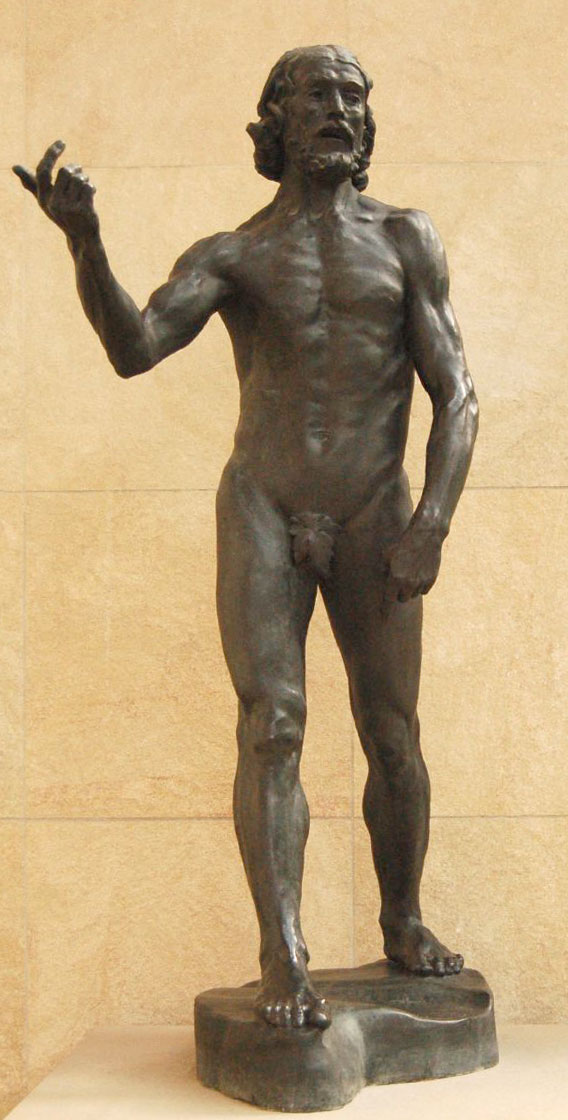
St. John the Baptist Preaching (1878)

A second male nude, St. John the Baptist Preaching, was completed in 1878. Rodin sought to avoid another charge of surmoulage by making the statue larger than life: St. John stands almost 6 feet 7 inches (2.01 m). While The Age of Bronze is statically posed, St. John gestures and seems to move toward the viewer. The effect of walking is achieved despite the figure having both feet firmly on the ground – a technical achievement that was lost on most contemporary critics. Rodin chose this contradictory position to, in his words, "display simultaneously...views of an object which in fact can be seen only successively".

Despite the title, St. John the Baptist Preaching did not have an obviously religious theme. The model, an Italian peasant who presented himself at Rodin's studio, possessed an idiosyncratic sense of movement that Rodin felt compelled to capture. Rodin thought of John the Baptist and carried that association into the title of the work. In 1880, Rodin submitted the sculpture to the Paris Salon. Critics were still mostly dismissive of his work, but the piece finished third in the Salon's sculpture category.

=== The Gates of Hell ===
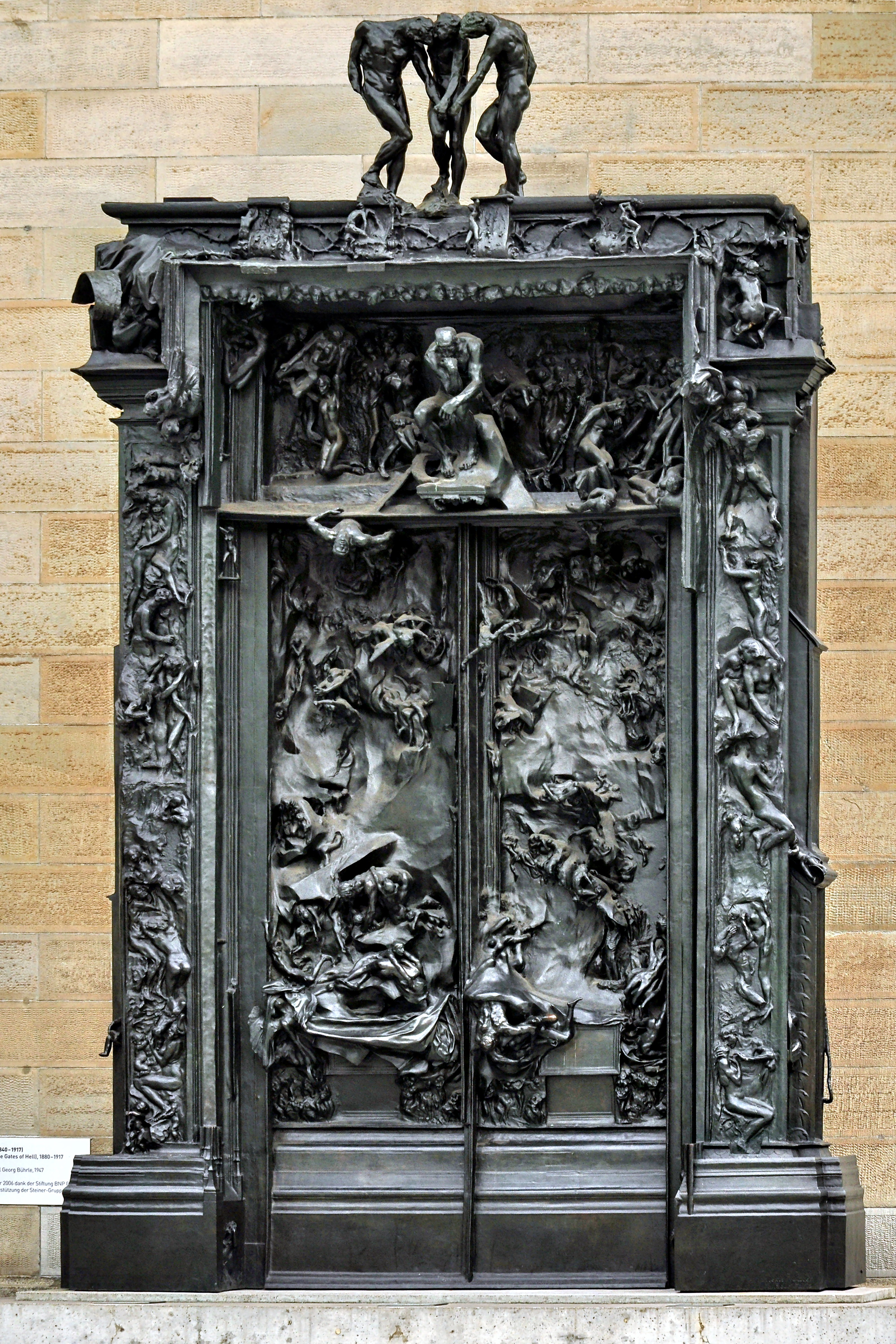
The Gates of Hell (unfinished), Kunsthaus Zürich

A commission to create a portal for Paris' planned Museum of Decorative Arts was awarded to Rodin in 1880. Although the museum was never built, Rodin worked throughout his life on The Gates of Hell, a monumental sculptural group depicting scenes from Dante's Inferno in high relief. Often lacking a clear conception of his major works, Rodin compensated with hard work and a striving for perfection.

He conceived The Gates with the surmoulage controversy still in mind: "...I had made the St. John to refute [the charges of casting from a model], but it only partially succeeded. To prove completely that I could model from life as well as other sculptors, I determined...to make the sculpture on the door of figures smaller than life." Laws of composition gave way to the Gates' disordered and untamed depiction of Hell. The figures and groups in this, Rodin's meditation on the condition of man, are physically and morally isolated in their torment.

The Gates of Hell comprised 186 figures in its final form. Many of Rodin's best-known sculptures started as designs of figures for this composition, such as The Thinker, The Three Shades, and The Kiss, and were only later presented as separate and independent works. Other well-known works derived from The Gates are Ugolino, Fallen Caryatid Carrying her Stone, Fugit Amor, She Who Was Once the Helmet-Maker's Beautiful Wife, The Falling Man, and The Prodigal Son.

=== The Thinker ===
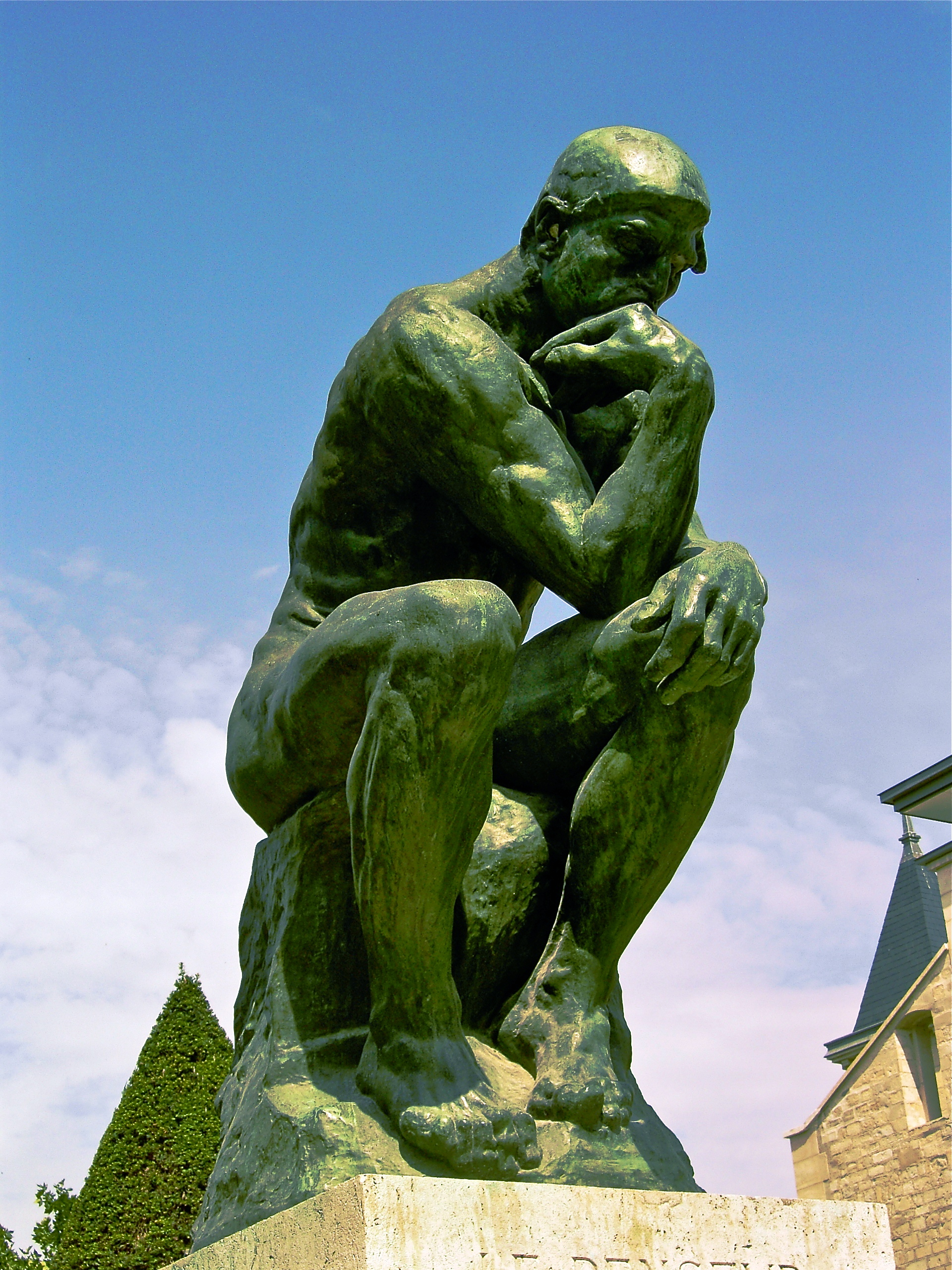
Rodin's The Thinker (1879–1889) is among the most recognized works in all of sculpture.

The Thinker (originally titled The Poet, after Dante) was to become one of the best-known sculptures in the world. The original was a 27.5-inch (700 mm) high bronze piece created between 1879 and 1889, designed for the Gates' lintel, from which the figure would gaze down upon Hell. While The Thinker most obviously characterizes Dante, aspects of the Biblical Adam, the mythological Prometheus, and Rodin himself have been ascribed to him. Other observers de-emphasize the apparent intellectual theme of The Thinker, stressing the figure's rough physicality and the emotional tension emanating from it.

=== The Burghers of Calais ===
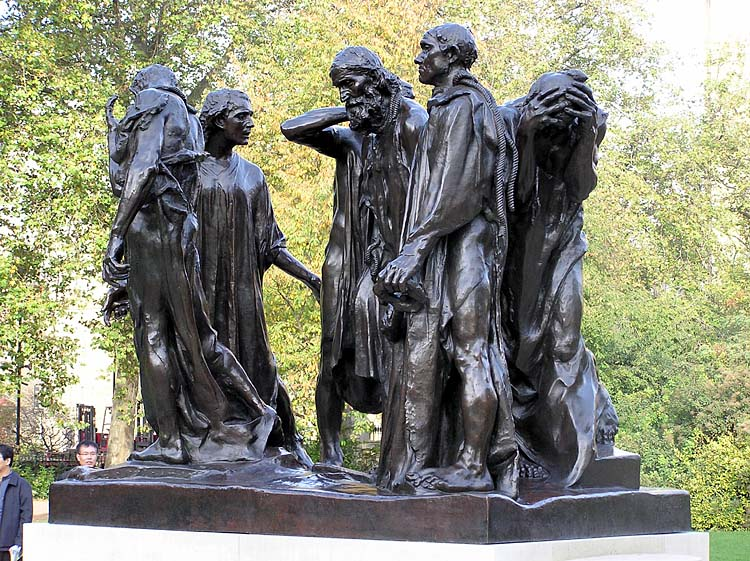
The Burghers of Calais (1884 – c. 1889) in Victoria Tower Gardens, London, England

The town of Calais had contemplated a historical monument for decades when Rodin learned of the project. He pursued the commission, interested in the medieval motif and patriotic theme. The mayor of Calais was tempted to hire Rodin on the spot upon visiting his studio, and soon the memorial was approved, with Rodin as its architect. It would commemorate the six townspeople of Calais who offered their lives to save their fellow citizens.

During the Hundred Years' War, the English army of King Edward III besieged Calais, and Edward ordered that the town's population be killed en masse. He agreed to spare them if six of the principal citizens would come to him prepared to die, bareheaded and barefooted and with ropes around their necks. When they came, he ordered that they be executed, but pardoned them when his queen, Philippa of Hainault, begged him to spare their lives. The Burghers of Calais depicts the men as they are leaving for the king's camp, carrying keys to the town's gates and citadel.

Rodin began the project in 1884, inspired by the chronicles of the siege by Jean Froissart. Though the town envisioned an allegorical, heroic piece centered on Eustache de Saint-Pierre, the eldest of the six men, Rodin conceived the sculpture as a study in the varied and complex emotions under which all six men were laboring. One year into the commission, the Calais committee was not impressed with Rodin's progress. Rodin indicated his willingness to end the project rather than change his design to meet the committee's conservative expectations, but Calais said to continue.

In 1889, The Burghers of Calais was first displayed to general acclaim. It is a bronze sculpture weighing two short tons (1,814 kg), and its figures are 6.6 ft (2.0 m) tall. The six men portrayed do not display a united, heroic front; rather, each is isolated from his brothers, individually deliberating and struggling with his expected fate. Rodin soon proposed that the monument's high pedestal be eliminated, wanting to move the sculpture to ground level so that viewers could "penetrate to the heart of the subject". At ground level, the figures' positions lead the viewer around the work, and subtly suggest their common movement forward.

The committee was incensed by the untraditional proposal, but Rodin would not yield. In 1895, Calais succeeded in having Burghers displayed in their preferred form: the work was placed in front of a public garden on a high platform, surrounded by a cast-iron railing. Rodin had wanted it located near the town hall, where it would engage the public. Only after damage during the First World War, subsequent storage, and Rodin's death was the sculpture displayed as he had intended. It is one of Rodin's best-known and most acclaimed works.

=== Commissions and controversy ===
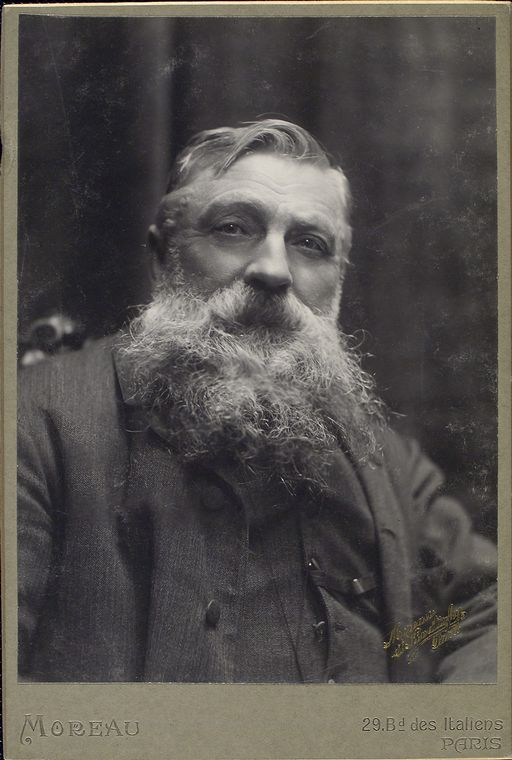
Rodin in mid-career

Commissioned to create a monument to French writer Victor Hugo in 1889, Rodin dealt extensively with the subject of artist and muse. Like many of Rodin's public commissions, Monument to Victor Hugo was met with resistance because it did not fit conventional expectations. Commenting on Rodin's monument to Victor Hugo, The Times in 1909 expressed that "there is some show of reason in the complaint that [Rodin's] conceptions are sometimes unsuited to his medium, and that in such cases they overstrain his vast technical powers". The 1897 plaster model was not cast in bronze until 1964.

The Société des Gens des Lettres, a Parisian organization of writers, planned a monument to French novelist Honoré de Balzac immediately after his death in 1850. The society commissioned Rodin to create the memorial in 1891, and Rodin spent years developing the concept for his sculpture. Challenged in finding an appropriate representation of Balzac given the author's rotund physique, Rodin produced many studies: portraits, full-length figures in the nude, wearing a frock coat, or in a robe – a replica of which Rodin had requested. The realized sculpture displays Balzac cloaked in the drapery, looking forcefully into the distance with deeply gouged features. Rodin's intent had been to show Balzac at the moment of conceiving a work – to express courage, labor, and struggle.

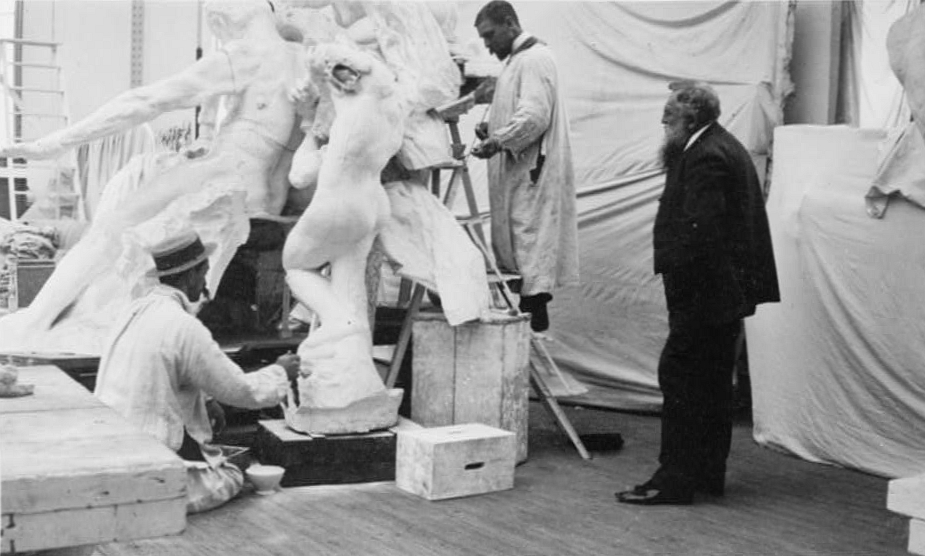
Rodin observing work on the monument to Victor Hugo at the studio of his assistant Henri Lebossé in 1896

When Monument to Balzac was exhibited in 1898, the negative reaction was not surprising. The Société rejected the work, and the press ran parodies. Criticizing the work, Morey (1918) reflected, "there may come a time, and doubtless will come a time, when it will not seem outre to represent a great novelist as a huge comic mask crowning a bathrobe, but even at the present day this statue impresses one as slang." A modern critic, indeed, claims that Balzac is one of Rodin's masterpieces.

The monument had its supporters in Rodin's day; a manifesto defending him was signed by Monet, Debussy, and future Premier Georges Clemenceau, among many others. In the BBC series Civilisation, art historian Kenneth Clark praised the monument as "the greatest piece of sculpture of the 19th Century, perhaps, indeed, the greatest since Michelangelo". Rather than try to convince skeptics of the merit of the monument, Rodin repaid the Société his commission and moved the figure to his garden. After this experience, Rodin did not complete another public commission. Only in 1939 was Monument to Balzac cast in bronze and placed on the Boulevard du Montparnasse at the intersection with Boulevard Raspail.

=== Other works ===
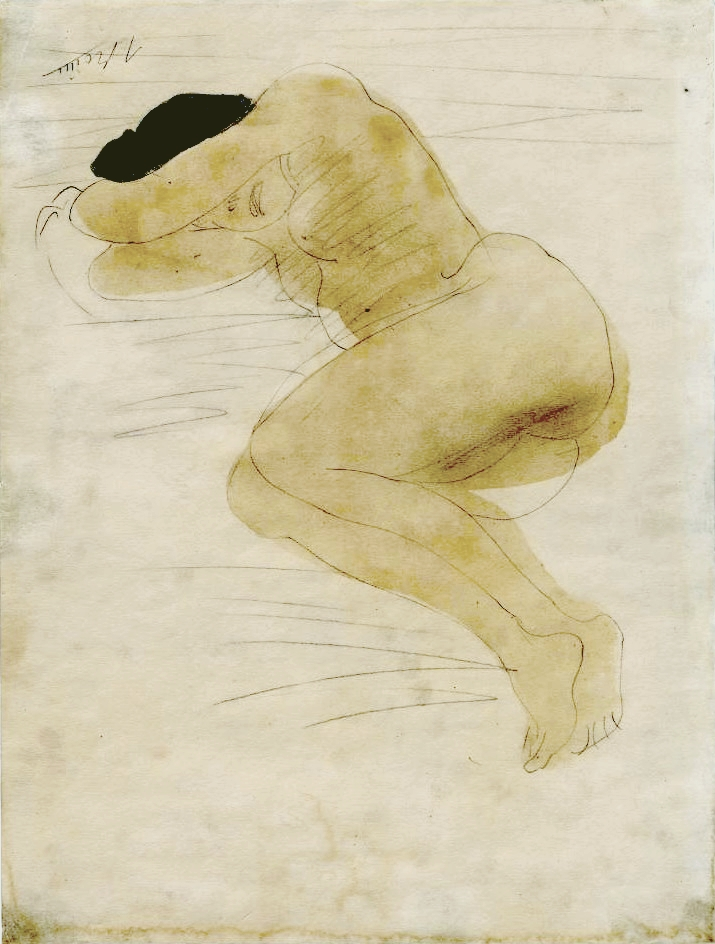
Reclining Woman (1890s) in the National Museum, Warsaw

The popularity of Rodin's most famous sculptures tends to obscure his total creative output. A prolific artist, he created thousands of busts, figures, and sculptural fragments over more than five decades. He painted in oils (especially in his thirties) and in watercolors. The Musée Rodin holds 7,000 of his drawings and prints, in chalk and charcoal, and thirteen vigorous drypoints.

Portraiture was an important component of Rodin's oeuvre, helping him to win acceptance and financial independence. His first sculpture was a bust of his father in 1860, and he produced at least 56 portraits between 1877 and his death in 1917. Early subjects included fellow sculptor Jules Dalou (1883) and companion Camille Claudel (1884).

Later, with his reputation established, Rodin made busts of prominent contemporaries such as English politician George Wyndham (1905), Irish playwright George Bernard Shaw (1906), socialist (and former mistress of the Prince of Wales) Countess of Warwick (1908), Austrian composer Gustav Mahler (1909), former Argentine president Domingo Faustino Sarmiento and French statesman Georges Clemenceau (1911).

His undated drawing Study of a Woman Nude, Standing, Arms Raised, Hands Crossed Above Head is one of the works seized in 2012 from the collection of Cornelius Gurlitt.

== Aesthetic ==
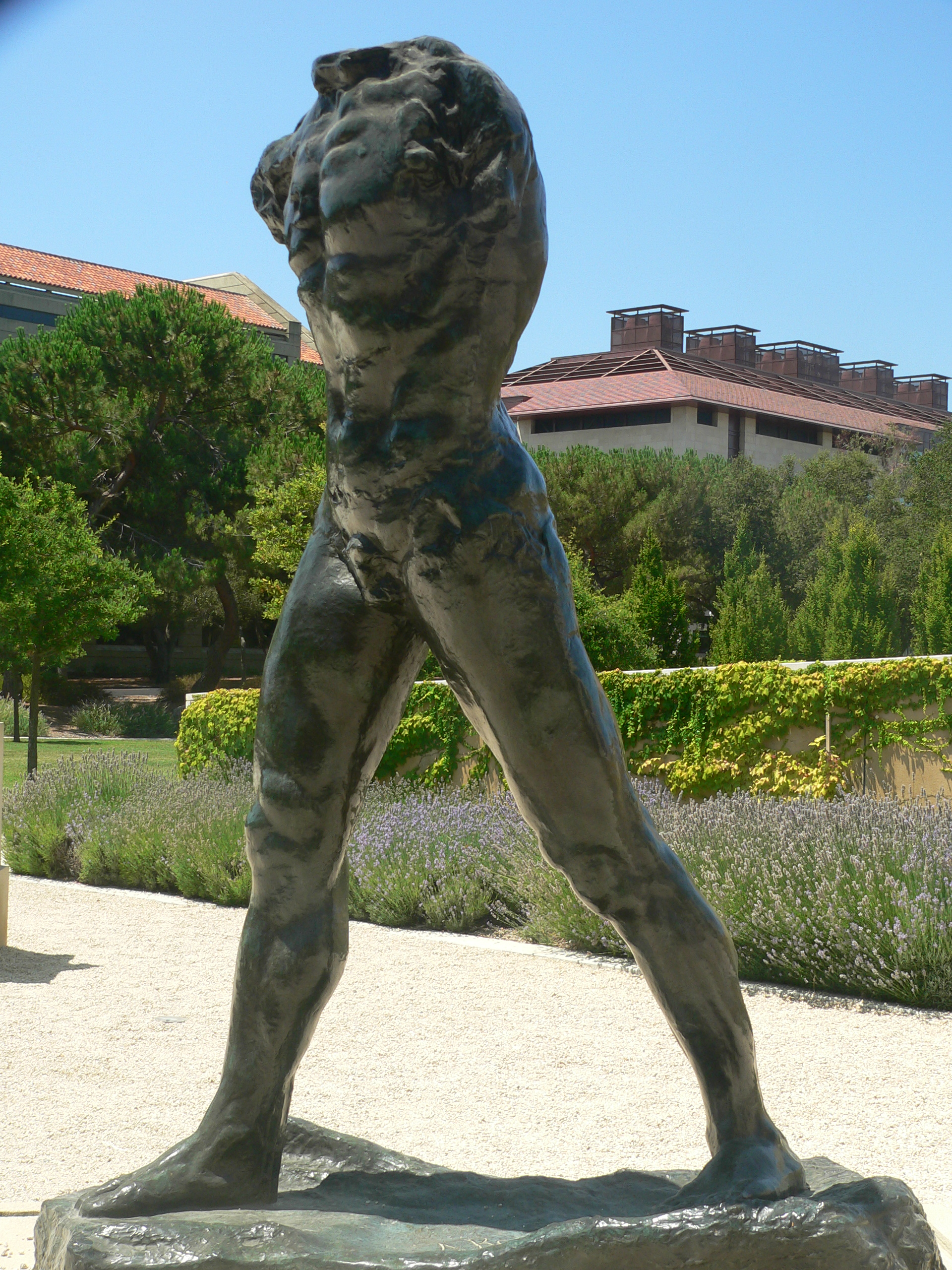
A famous "fragment": The Walking Man (1877–78)

Rodin was a naturalist, less concerned with monumental expression than with character and emotion. Departing with centuries of tradition, he turned away from the idealism of the Greeks, and the decorative beauty of the Baroque and neo-Baroque movements. His sculpture emphasized the individual and the concreteness of flesh, and suggested emotion through detailed, textured surfaces, and the interplay of light and shadow. To a greater degree than his contemporaries, Rodin believed that an individual's character was revealed by his physical features.

Rodin's talent for surface modeling allowed him to let every part of the body speak for the whole. The male's passion in The Thinker is suggested by the grip of his toes on the rock, the rigidness of his back, and the differentiation of his hands. Speaking of The Thinker, Rodin illuminated his aesthetic: "What makes my Thinker think is that he thinks not only with his brain, with his knitted brow, his distended nostrils and compressed lips, but with every muscle of his arms, back, and legs, with his clenched fist and gripping toes."

Like other artists associated with the Symbolist movement, Rodin viewed suffering and conflict as hallmarks of modern art. "Nothing, really, is more moving than the maddened beast, dying from unfulfilled desire and asking in vain for grace to quell its passion." Charles Baudelaire echoed those themes and was among Rodin's favorite poets. Rodin enjoyed music, especially the opera composer Gluck, and wrote a book about French cathedrals. He owned a work by the as-yet-unrecognized Vincent van Gogh and admired El Greco.

=== Method ===
Instead of copying traditional academic postures, Rodin preferred his models to move naturally around his studio (despite their nakedness). The sculptor often made quick sketches in clay that were later fine-tuned, cast in plaster, and cast in bronze or carved from marble. Rodin's focus was on the handling of clay.

George Bernard Shaw sat for a portrait and gave an idea of Rodin's technique: "While he worked, he achieved a number of miracles. At the end of the first fifteen minutes, after having given a simple idea of the human form to the block of clay, he produced by the action of his thumb a bust so living that I would have taken it away with me to relieve the sculptor of any further work."

He described the evolution of his bust over a month, passing through "all the stages of art's evolution": first, a "Byzantine masterpiece", then "Bernini intermingled", then an elegant Houdon. "The hand of Rodin worked not as the hand of a sculptor works, but as the work of Elan Vital. The Hand of God is his own hand."

After he completed his work in clay, he employed highly skilled assistants to re-sculpt his compositions at larger sizes (including any of his large-scale monuments such as The Thinker), to cast the clay compositions into plaster or bronze, and to carve his marbles. Rodin's major innovation was to capitalize on such multi-staged processes of 19th century sculpture and their reliance on plaster casting.

Since clay deteriorates rapidly if not kept wet or fired into a terra-cotta, sculptors used plaster casts as a means of securing the composition they would make from the fugitive material that is clay. This was common practice amongst Rodin's contemporaries, and sculptors would exhibit plaster casts with the hopes that they would be commissioned to have the works made in a more permanent material. Rodin, however, would have multiple plasters made and treat them as the raw material of sculpture, recombining their parts and figures into new compositions, and new names.

As Rodin's practice developed into the 1890s, he became more and more radical in his pursuit of fragmentation, the combination of figures at different scales, and the making of new compositions from his earlier work. A prime example of this is the bold The Walking Man (1899–1900), which was exhibited at his major one-person show in 1900. This is composed of two sculptures from the 1870s that Rodin found in his studio – a broken and damaged torso that had fallen into neglect and the lower extremities of a statuette version of his 1878 St. John the Baptist Preaching he was having re-sculpted at a reduced scale.

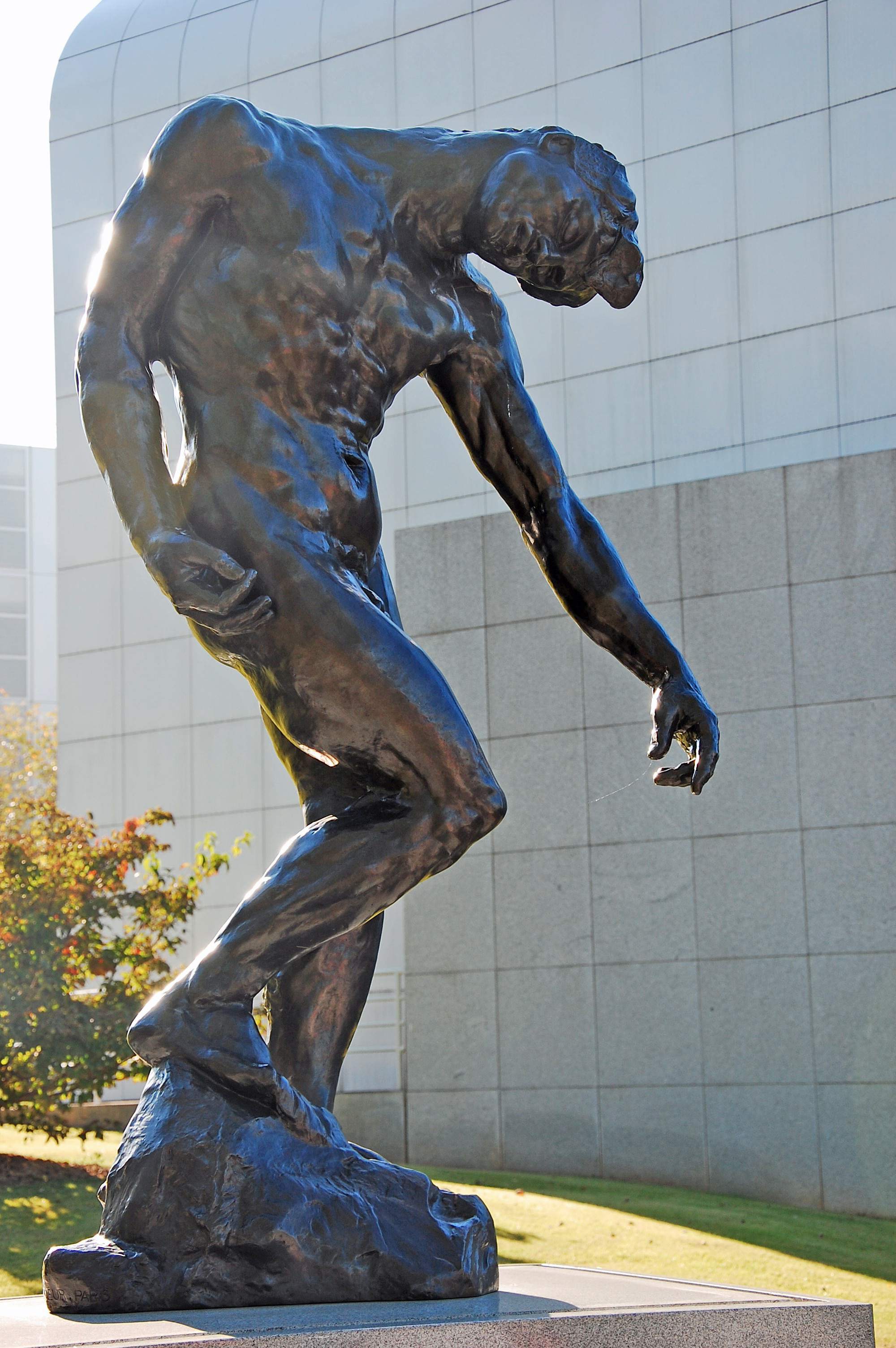
The Shade (1880–81), High Museum of Art, Atlanta

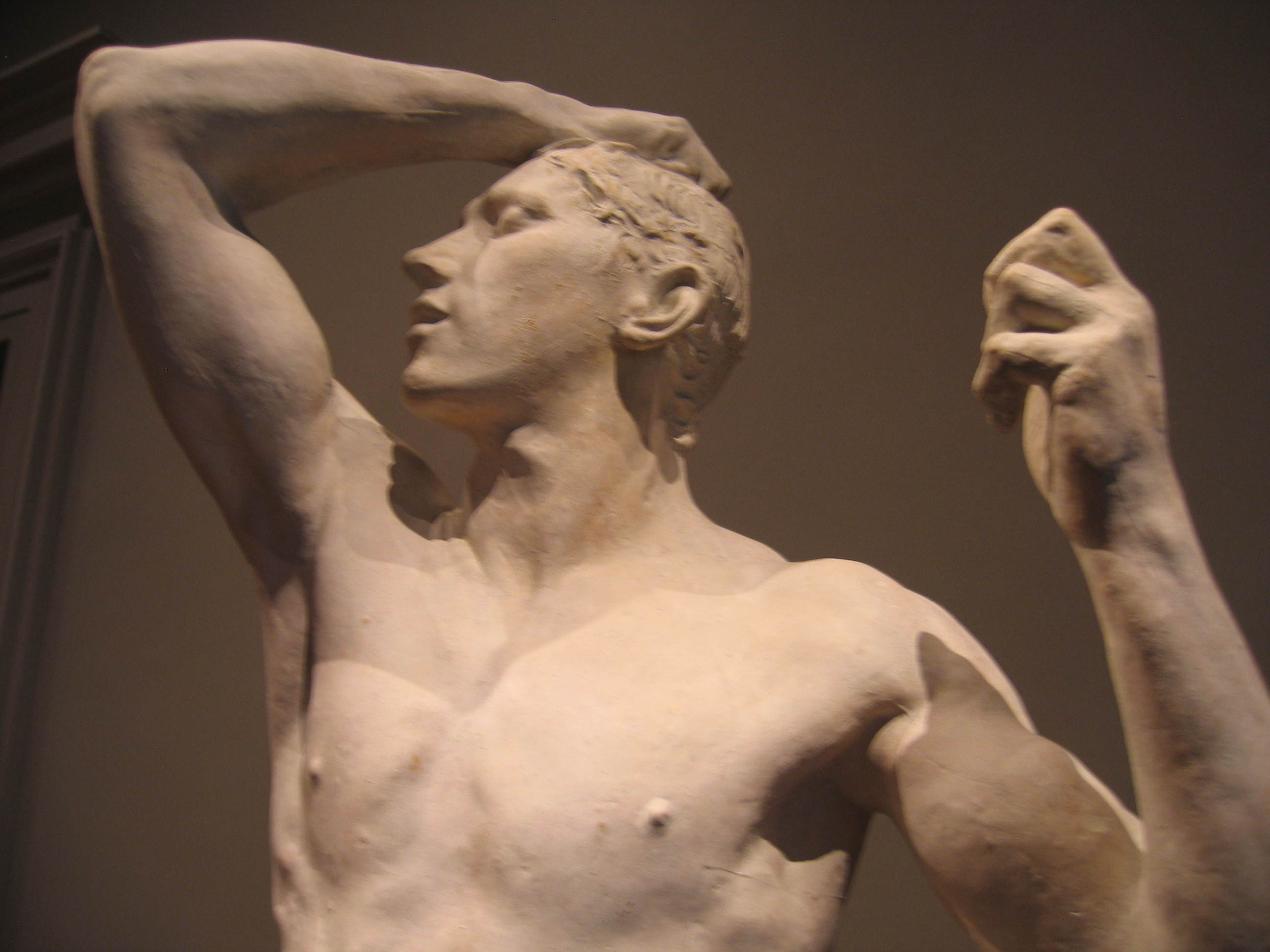
A plaster of The Age of Bronze

== Later years (1900–1917) ==
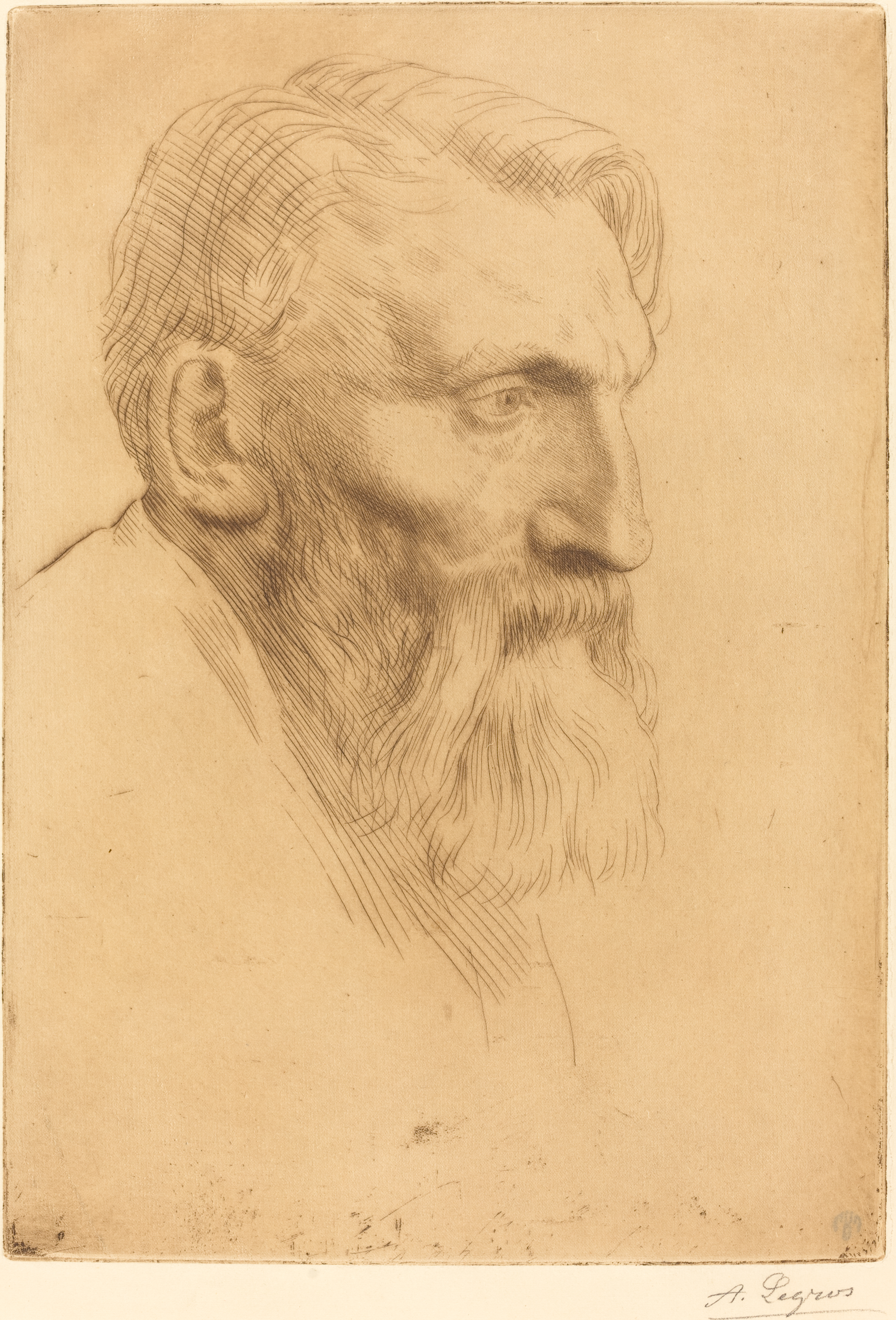
A portrait of Rodin by his friend Alphonse Legros

By 1900, Rodin's artistic reputation was established. Gaining exposure from a pavilion of his artwork set up near the 1900 World's Fair (Exposition Universelle) in Paris, he received requests to make busts of prominent people internationally, while his assistants at the atelier produced duplicates of his works. His income from portrait commissions alone totaled probably 200,000 francs a year. As Rodin's fame grew, he attracted many followers, including the German poet Rainer Maria Rilke, and authors Octave Mirbeau, Joris-Karl Huysmans, and Oscar Wilde.

Rilke stayed with Rodin in 1905 and 1906 and did administrative work for him; he would later write a laudatory monograph on the sculptor. Rodin and Beuret's modest country estate in Meudon, purchased in 1897, was a host to such guests as King Edward VII, dancer Isadora Duncan, and harpsichordist Wanda Landowska. A British journalist who visited the property noted in 1902 that in its complete isolation, there was "a striking analogy between its situation and the personality of the man who lives in it". Rodin moved to the city in 1908, renting the main floor of the Hôtel Biron, an 18th-century townhouse. He left Beuret in Meudon and began an affair with the American-born Duchesse de Choiseul. From 1910, he mentored the Russian sculptor, Moissey Kogan.

=== United States ===
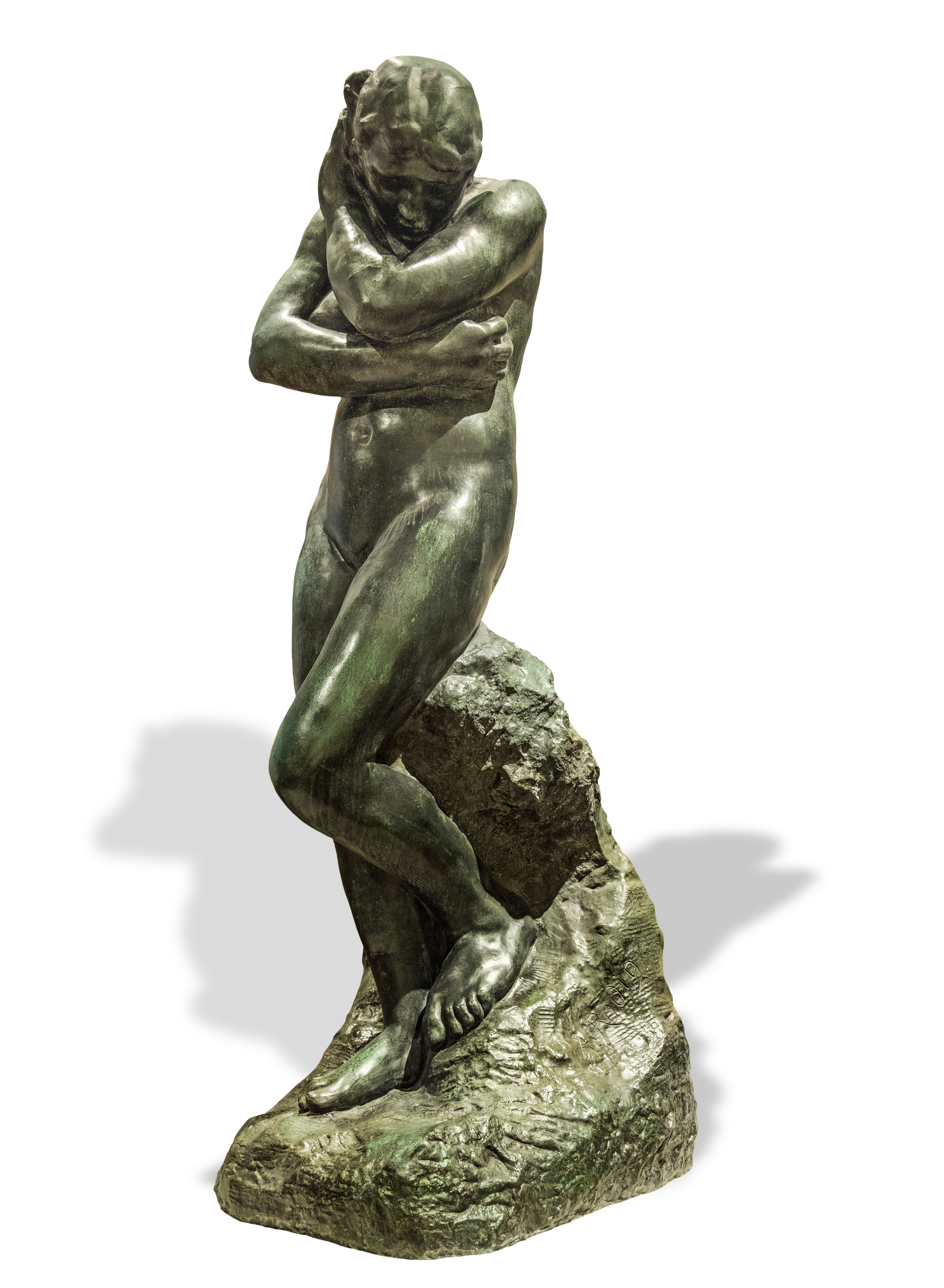
Ève au rocher, 1881 – c. 1899 bronze, Jardin des Tuileries, Paris

While Rodin was beginning to be accepted in France by the time of The Burghers of Calais, he had not yet conquered the American market. Because of his technique and the frankness of some of his work, he did not have an easy time selling his work to American industrialists. However, he came to know Sarah Tyson Hallowell (1846–1924), a curator from Chicago who visited Paris to arrange exhibitions at the large Interstate Expositions of the 1870s and 1880s. Hallowell was not only a curator but an adviser and a facilitator who was trusted by a number of prominent American collectors to suggest works for their collections, the most prominent of these being the Chicago hotelier Potter Palmer and his wife, Bertha Palmer (1849–1918).

The next opportunity for Rodin in America was the 1893 Chicago World's Fair. Hallowell wanted to help promote Rodin's work and he suggested a solo exhibition, which she wrote him was beaucoup moins beau que l'original but impossible, outside the rules. Instead, she suggested he send a number of works for her loan exhibition of French art from American collections and she told him she would list them as being part of an American collection. Rodin sent Hallowell three works, Cupid and Psyche, Sphinx and Andromeda. All nudes, these works provoked great controversy and were ultimately hidden behind a drape with special permission given for viewers to see them.

Bust of Dalou and Burgher of Calais were on display in the official French pavilion at the fair and so between the works that were on display and those that were not, he was noticed. However, the works he gave Hallowell to sell found no takers, but she soon brought the controversial Quaker-born financier Charles Yerkes (1837–1905) into the fold and he purchased two large marbles for his Chicago manse; Yerkes was likely the first American to own a Rodin sculpture.

Other collectors soon followed including the tastemaking Potter Palmers of Chicago and Isabella Stewart Gardner (1840–1924) of Boston, all arranged by Sarah Hallowell. In appreciation for her efforts at unlocking the American market, Rodin eventually presented Hallowell with a bronze, a marble and a terra cotta. When Hallowell moved to Paris in 1893, she and Rodin continued their warm friendship and correspondence, which lasted to the end of the sculptor's life. After Hallowell's death, her niece, the painter Harriet Hallowell, inherited the Rodins and after her death, the American heirs could not manage to match their value in order to export them, so they became the property of the French state.

=== Great Britain ===
After the start of the 20th century, Rodin was a regular visitor to Great Britain, where he developed a loyal following by the beginning of World War I. He first visited England in 1881, where his friend, the artist Alphonse Legros, had introduced him to the poet William Ernest Henley. With his personal connections and enthusiasm for Rodin's art, Henley was most responsible for Rodin's reception in Britain. Rodin later returned the favor by sculpting a bust of Henley that was used as the frontispiece to Henley's collected works and, after his death, on his monument in London.

Through Henley, Rodin met Robert Louis Stevenson and Robert Browning, in whom he found further support. Encouraged by the enthusiasm of British artists, students, and high society for his art, Rodin donated a selection of his works to the nation in 1914.

After the revitalization of the Société Nationale des Beaux-Arts in 1890, Rodin served as the body's vice-president. In 1903, Rodin was elected president of the International Society of Painters, Sculptors, and Engravers. He replaced its former president, James Abbott McNeill Whistler, upon Whistler's death. His election to the prestigious position was largely due to the efforts of Albert Ludovici, father of English philosopher Anthony Ludovici, who was private secretary to Rodin for several months in 1906, but the two men parted company after Christmas, "to their mutual relief".

During his later creative years, Rodin's work turned increasingly toward the female form, and themes of more overt masculinity and femininity. He concentrated on small dance studies, and produced numerous erotic drawings, sketched in a loose way, without taking his pencil from the paper or his eyes from the model. Rodin met American dancer Isadora Duncan in 1900, attempted to seduce her, and the next year sketched studies of her and her students. In July 1906, Rodin was also enchanted by dancers from the Royal Ballet of Cambodia and produced some of his most famous drawings from the experience.

=== Marriage and death ===
Fifty-three years into their relationship, Rodin married Rose Beuret. They married on 29 January 1917, and Beuret died two weeks later, on 14 February. Rodin was ill that year; in January, he suffered weakness from influenza, and on 16 November his physician announced that "congestion of the lungs has caused great weakness. The patient's condition is grave." Rodin died the next day, aged 77, at his villa in Meudon, Île-de-France, on the outskirts of Paris.

A cast of The Thinker was placed next to his tomb in Meudon; it was Rodin's wish that the figure served as his headstone and epitaph. In 1923, Marcell Tirel, Rodin's secretary, published a book alleging that Rodin's death was largely due to cold, and the fact that he had no heat at Meudon. Rodin requested permission to stay in the Hotel Biron, a museum of his works, but the director of the museum refused.

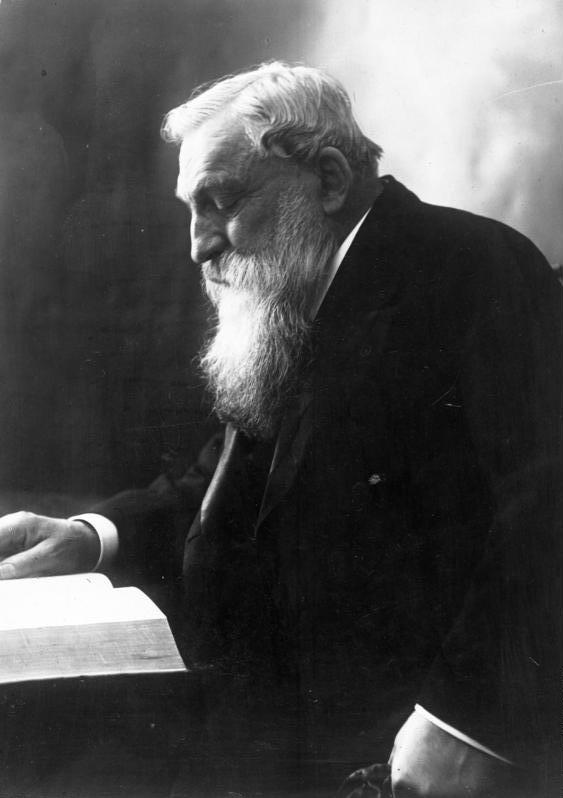
Rodin in 1914

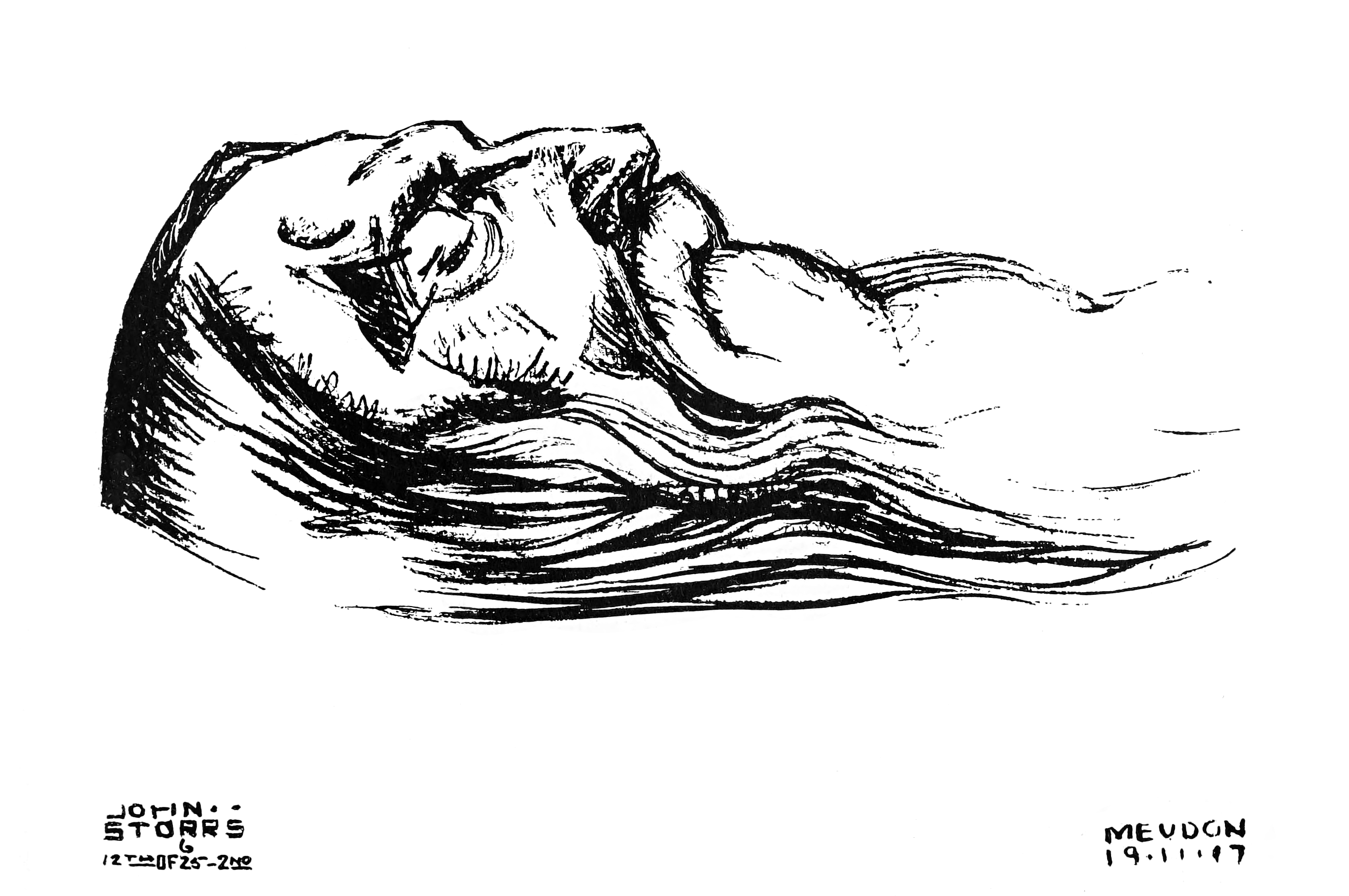
Rodin on His Deathbed (1917), lithograph by John Storrs

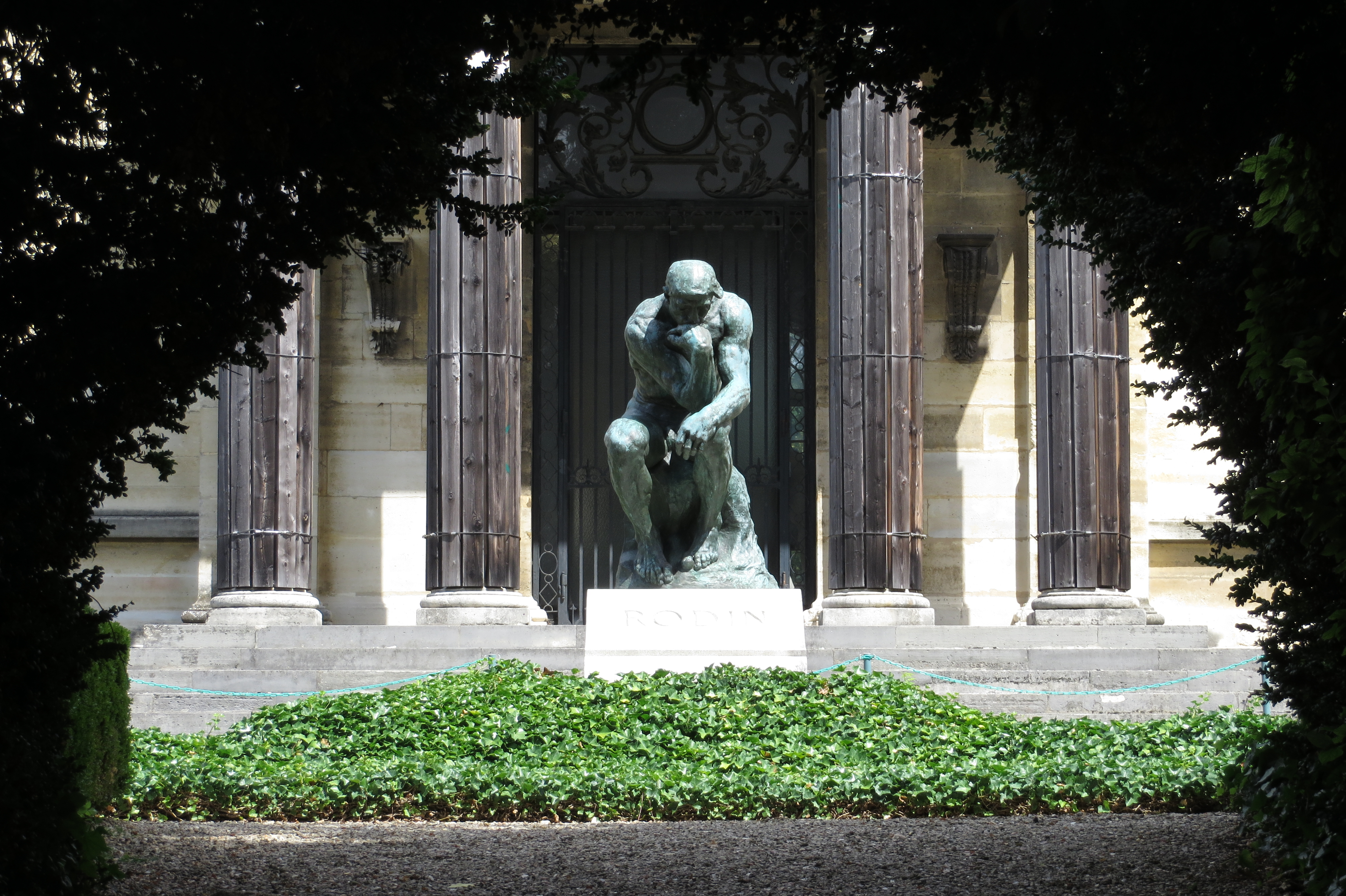
Rodin's gravesite at the Musée Rodin de Meudon

== Legacy ==
Rodin willed to the French state his studio and the right to make casts from his plasters. Because he encouraged the edition of his sculpted work, Rodin's sculptures are represented in many public and private collections. The Musée Rodin was founded in 1916 and opened in 1919 at the Hôtel Biron, where Rodin had lived, and it holds the largest Rodin collection, with more than 6,000 sculptures and 7,000 works on paper. The French order Légion d'honneur made him a Commander, and he received an honorary doctorate from the University of Oxford in 1907.

During his lifetime, Rodin was compared to Michelangelo and praised as the greatest artist of the era. In the three decades following his death, his popularity waned with changing aesthetic values. Since the 1950s, Rodin's work gained public appreciation and admiration again and has been the subject of much scholarly work. The unfinished nature offered by some of his sculpture, such as The Walking Man, influenced the increasingly abstract sculptural forms of the 20th century.

Rodin captured the physical and emotional force of the human subject and provided foundations for greater expressionism in the 20th century. His best known works, including The Kiss and The Thinker, are known in popular culture as symbols of human emotion and character. To honor Rodin's artistic legacy, the Google search engine homepage displayed a Google Doodle featuring The Thinker to celebrate his 172nd birthday on 12 November 2012.

Rodin was an influential mentor to a generation of sculptors who studied in his workshop. These include Gutzon Borglum, Antoine Bourdelle, Constantin Brâncuși, Camille Claudel, Charles Despiau, Malvina Hoffman, Carl Milles, François Pompon, Rodo, Gustav Vigeland, Clara Westhoff and Margaret Winser, even though Brancusi later rejected his legacy. Rodin also promoted the work of other sculptors, including Aristide Maillol and Ivan Meštrović whom Rodin once called "the greatest phenomenon amongst sculptors". Other sculptors whose work has been described as owing to Rodin include Joseph Csaky, Alexander Archipenko, Joseph Bernard, Henri Gaudier-Brzeska, Georg Kolbe, Wilhelm Lehmbruck, Jacques Lipchitz, Pablo Picasso, Adolfo Wildt, and Ossip Zadkine. Henry Moore acknowledged Rodin's seminal influence on his work.

Several films have been made that portray Rodin as a heroic subject, but also a controversial presence. Two films, Camille Claudel, a 1988 film with Gérard Depardieu as Rodin, and Camille Claudel 1915 from 2013, consider Rodin's relationship with Claudel, a young sculptor in his studio who was his artistic collaborator and romantic partner before being institutionized.

In Rodin, a 2017 film starring Vincent Lindon as Rodin. Rodin is the subject of the 2026 comic book Sculpter l'éternité by Xavier Coste. The Rodin Studios artists' cooperative housing in New York City, completed in 1917 to designs by Cass Gilbert, was named after Rodin.

The Kiss, 1889

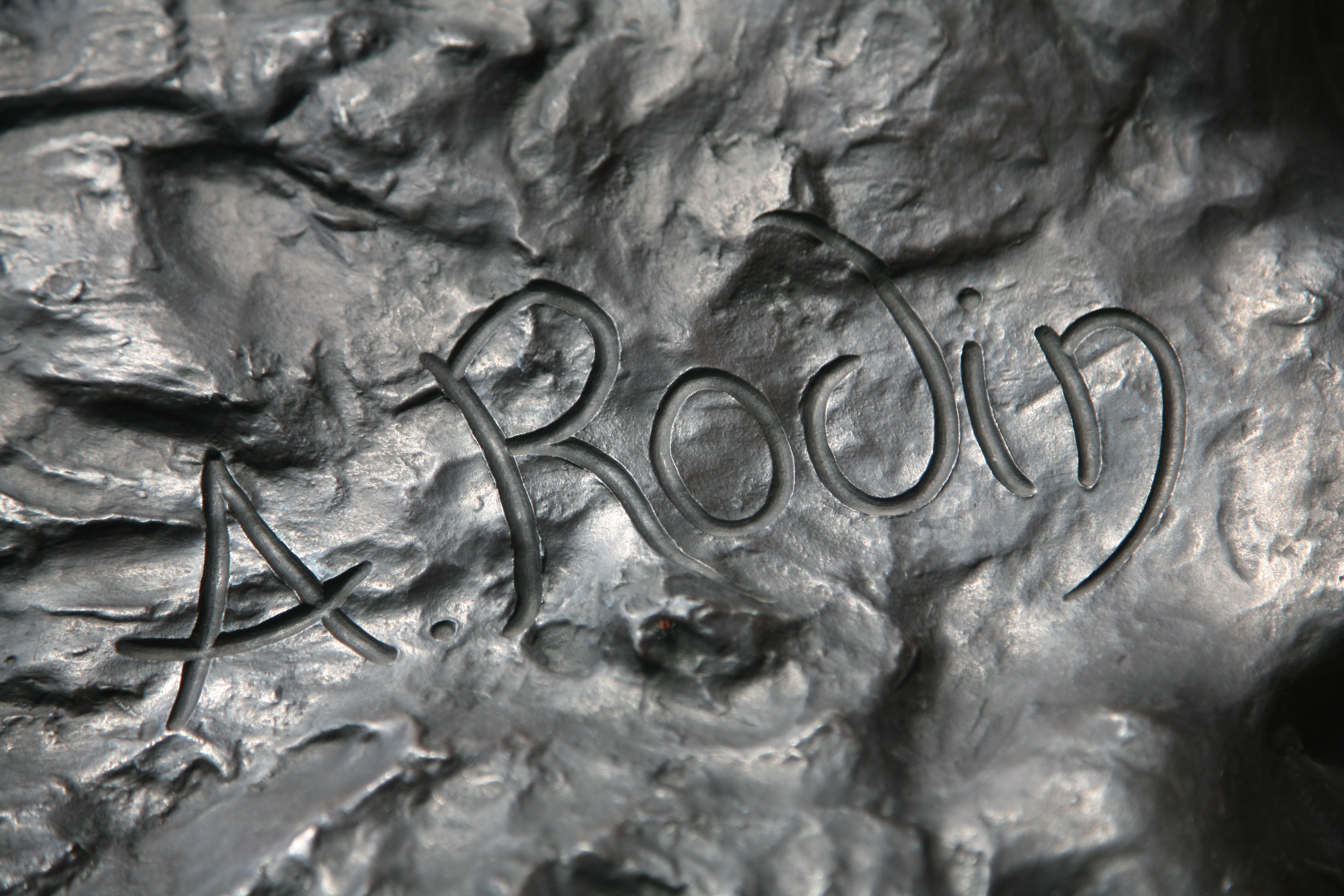
Rodin's signature on The Thinker

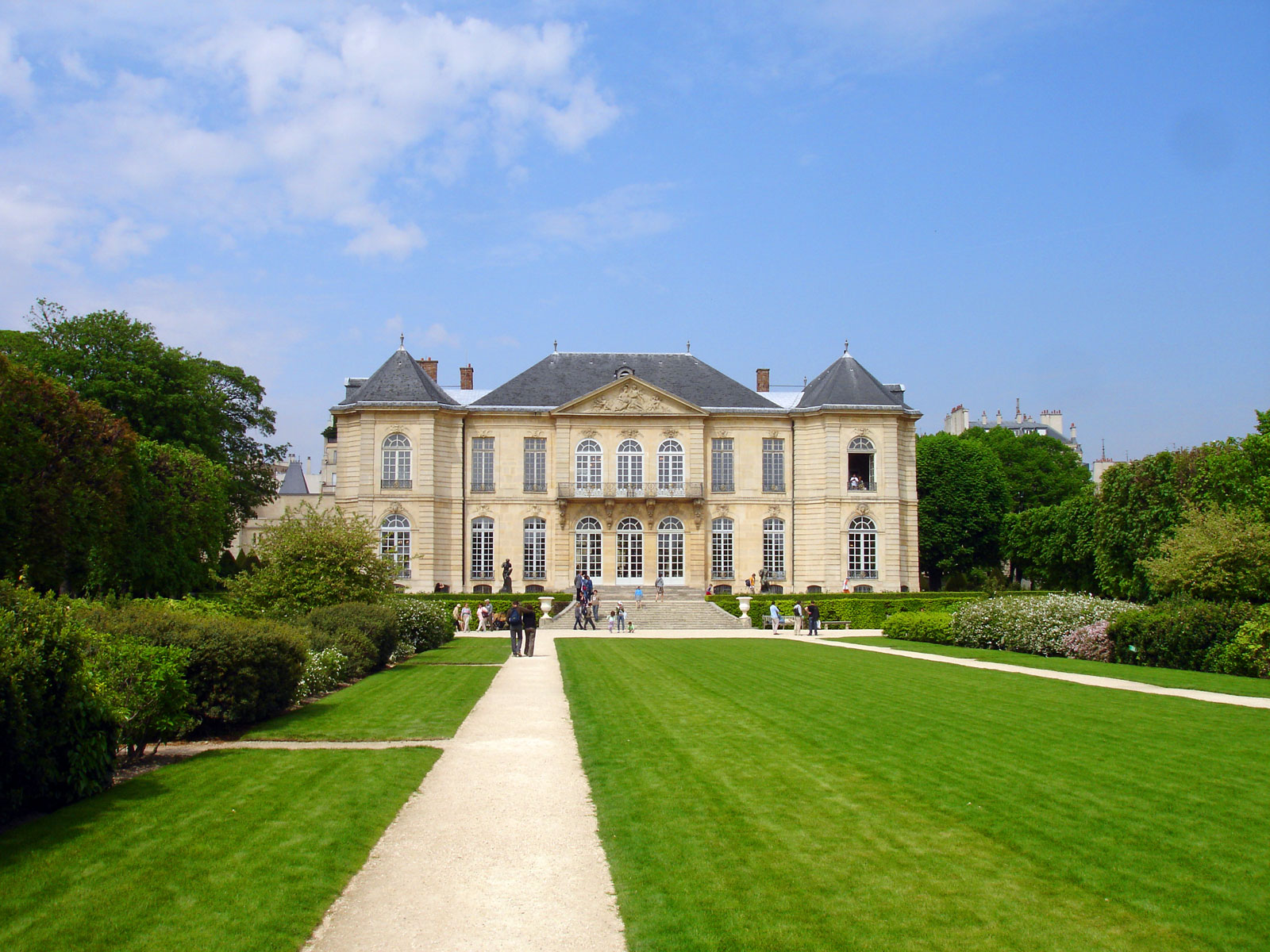
The grounds of Musée Rodin

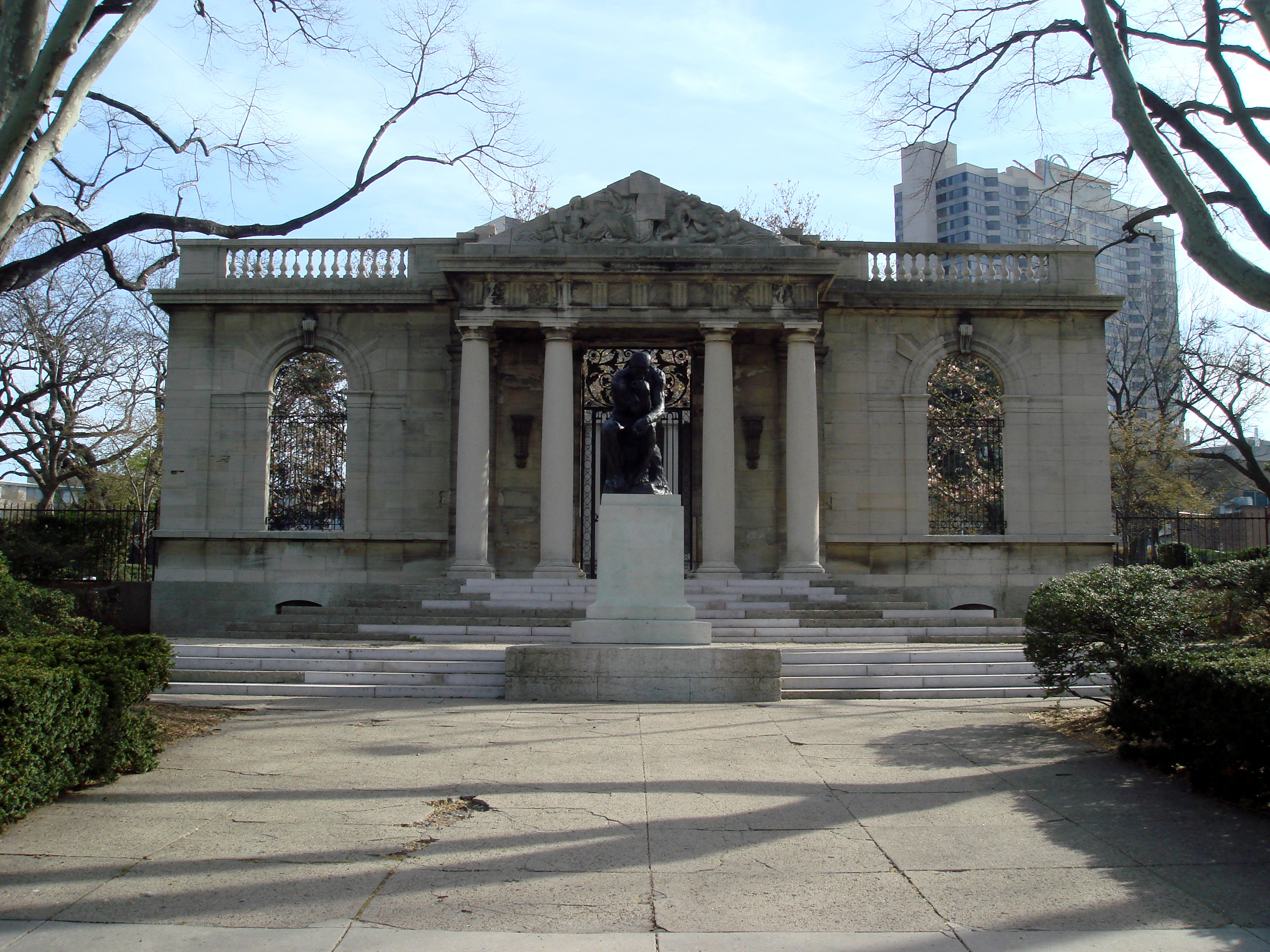
Rodin Museum, Philadelphia, Pennsylvania

=== Forgeries ===
The relative ease of making reproductions has also encouraged many forgeries: a survey of expert opinion placed Rodin among the top ten most-faked artists. Rodin fought against forgeries of his works as early as 1901, and since his death, many cases of organized, large-scale forgeries have been revealed. A massive forgery was discovered by French authorities in the early 1990s and led to the conviction of art dealer Guy Hain.

To deal with the complexity of bronze reproduction, France has promulgated several laws since 1956 which limit reproduction to twelve casts – the maximum number that can be made from an artist's plasters and still be considered his work. As a result of this limit, The Burghers of Calais, for example, is found in fourteen cities.

In the market for sculpture, plagued by fakes, the value of a piece increases significantly when its provenance can be established. A Rodin work with a verified history sold for US$4.8 million in 1999, and Rodin's bronze Ève, grand modele – version sans rocher sold for $18.9 million at a 2008 Christie's auction in New York. Art critics concerned about authenticity have argued that taking a cast does not equal reproducing a Rodin sculpture – especially given the importance of surface treatment in Rodin's work.

A number of drawings previously attributed to Rodin are now known to have been forged by Ernest Durig.

== Honours and awards ==
- Chevalier of the Order of Legion of Honour (1889)
- Officier of the Order of Legion of Honour (1892)
- Commandeur of the Order of Legion of Honour (1903)
- Grand Officier of the Order of Legion of Honour (1910)

== See also ==
- List of sculptures by Auguste Rodin
- Auguste Rodin left many sculptural traces in Brussels | Focus on Belgium
- FRENCH SCULPTURE CENSUS - French sculpture 1500-1960 in North American public collections

== Sources ==
- Crone, Rainer; Salzmann, Siegfried, eds. (1992). Rodin: Eros and Creativity. Munich: Prestel. ISBN 978-3-7913-1809-7.
- Elsen, Albert E. (1963). Rodin. New York: The Museum of Modern Art. LCCN 63014847.
- Getsy, David (2010). Rodin: Sex and the Making of Modern Sculpture. New Haven: Yale University Press. ISBN 978-0-300-16725-2.
- Hale, William Harlan (1973) [1969]. World of Rodin, 1840–1917 (Time-Life Library of Art ed.). New York: Time-Life Books. LCCN 70105511.
- Janson, H.W. (1986). History of Art (3rd ed.). New York: Harry N. Abrams. ISBN 978-0-8109-1094-2.
- Jianou, Ionel & Goldscheider, C. (1967). Rodin. Paris: Arted, Editions d'Art. LCCN 68084071.
- Lampert, Catherine (1986). Rodin: Sculpture and Drawings. New Haven: Yale University Press. ISBN 978-0-7287-0504-3.
- Le Normand-Romain, Antoinette (2007). The Bronzes of Rodin. Paris: Editions de la Réunion des Musées Nationaux.
- Ludovici, Anthony (1926). Personal Reminiscences of Auguste Rodin. London: John Murray.
- Morseburg, Jeffrey (2010). The Indefatigable Miss Hallowell. (Online Essay)
- Taillandier, Yvon (1977). Rodin. New York: Crown Trade Paperbacks. ISBN 978-0-517-88378-5.
- Tucker, William (1974). Early Modern Sculpture. New York: Oxford University Press. ISBN 978-0-19-519773-0.
- Weisberg, Gabriel (1987). The Documented Image, Visions in Art History. New York: Syracuse University Press. ISBN 978-0-8156-2410-3.
- Rodin, Auguste (1984). Art: Conversations with Paul Gsell. Berkeley: University of California Press. ISBN 978-0-520-05887-3.
- Royal Academy of Arts (2006). Rodin. London: Royal Academy of Arts.
