= The Walking Man =

Sculpture by Auguste Rodin

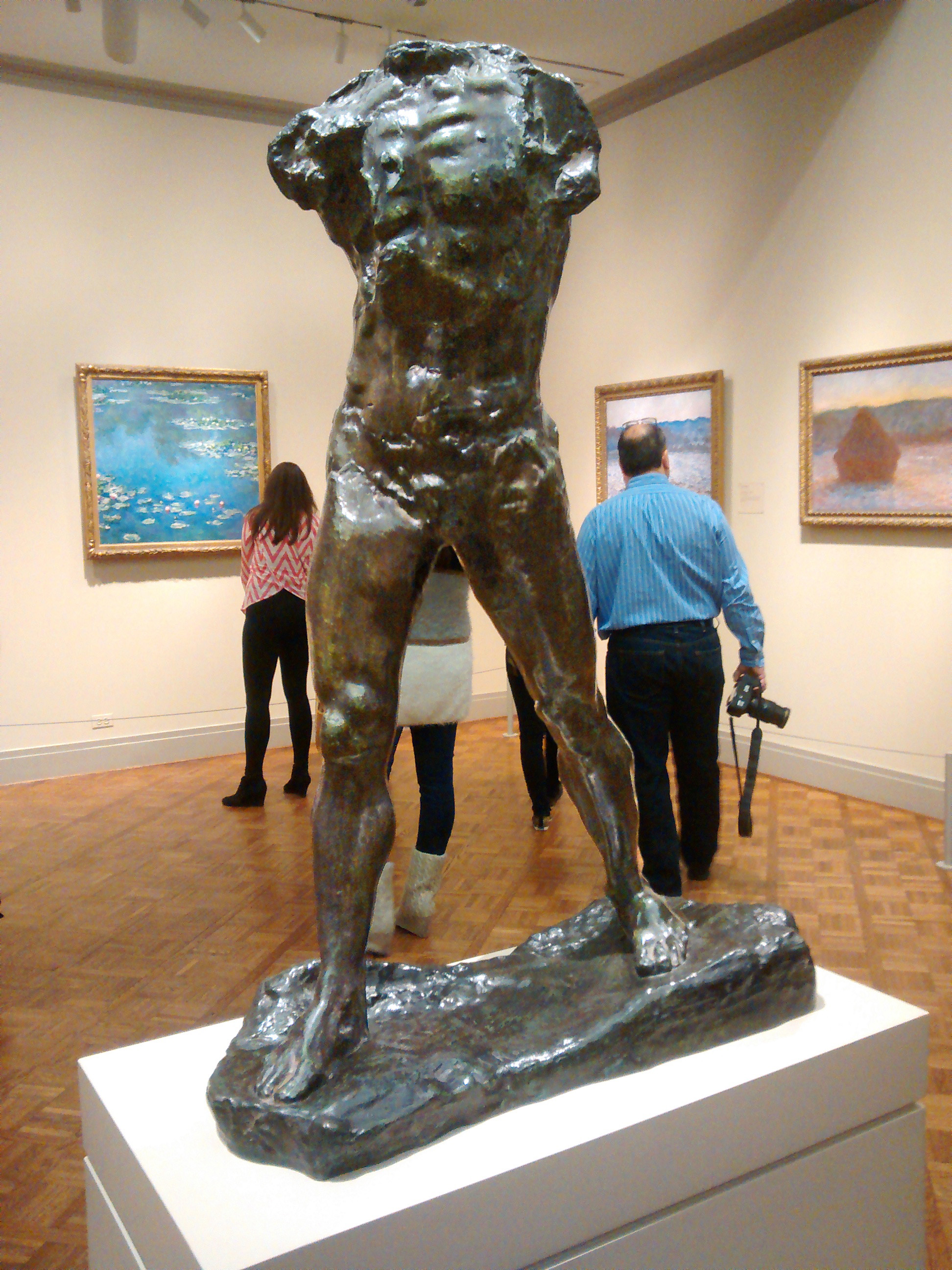
- at the Art Institute of Chicago
- Artist: Auguste Rodin
- Medium: Bronze

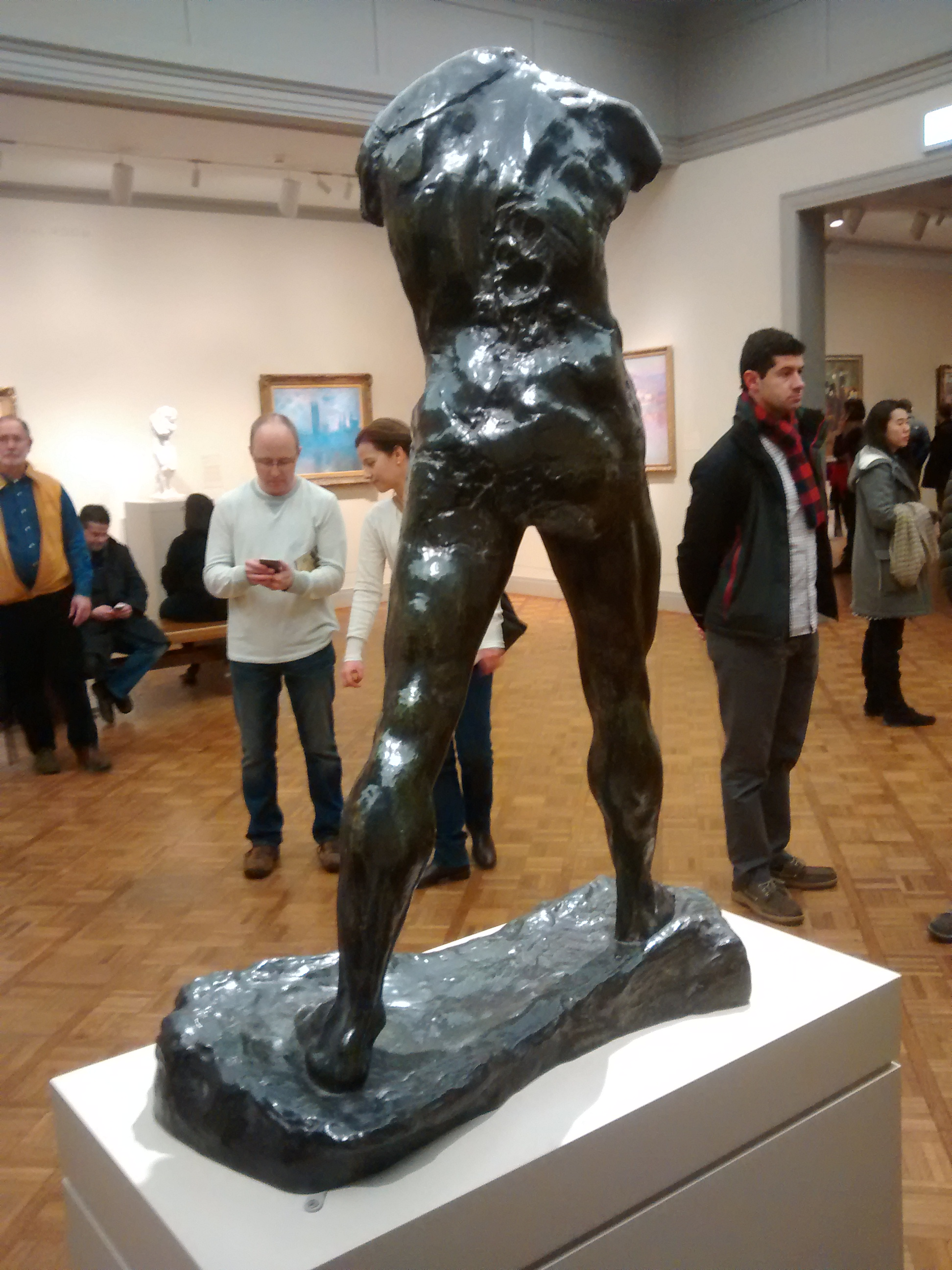
The Walking Man's rear

The Walking Man (French: L'homme qui marche) is a bronze sculpture by the French sculptor Auguste Rodin. This sculpture was made in 1907.

The best example of Rodin’s ‘sketchy’ impressionist sculpture also happens to be his most well-known ‘incomplete’ figure. This work personifies the latter part of Rodin’s career: the dynamic pose of a partial figure. Deriving much from Rodin’s earlier work St. John the Baptist Preaching, including the powerful stance, Rodin had stripped all academic associations from his figure, and instead focused on what he considered essential: the dynamic pose.

According to the bibliography supplied by the National Gallery of Art, The Walking Man is a version of St. John without head and arms. This sculpture was previously considered a preliminary study for the complete Baptist and was based on the movement of that piece. According to Albert Elsen and Henry Moore's suggestions, The Walking Man was created for the purpose of a Roman or Greek art without any live reference.

== Praise ==
The art historian Leo Steinberg said of The Walking Man’s pose:

The stance is profoundly unclassical, especially in the digging-in conveyed by the pigeon-toed stride and the rotation of the upper torso. Unlike the balanced, self-possessed classical posture with both feet turned out, Rodin uses the kind of step that brings all power to bear on the moment’s work

== Inspiration ==
The statue has served as the inspiration for the works of other artists, such as Carl Sandburg, who described it in his 1916 poem, "The Walking Man of Rodin":

THE WALKING MAN OF RODIN
Legs hold a torso away from the earth.
And a regular high poem of legs is here.
Powers of bone and cord raise a belly and lungs
Out of ooze and over the loam where eyes look and ears hear
And arms have a chance to hammer and shoot and run motors.
You make us
Proud of our legs, old man.

And you left off the head here,

The skull found always crumbling neighbor of the ankles.

== See also ==
- List of sculptures by Auguste Rodin
- List of public art in Houston
