= Paul Pálffy ab Erdöd =

Hungarian sportsman

Count Paul Pálffy
- Born: Franz Paul Rudolf Maria Josef Pálffy ab Erdöd; 12 February 1890; Vienna, Austria-Hungary
- Died: 11 October 1968 (aged 78); Munich, Bavaria, West Germany
- Occupations: Sportsman, author, landowner
- Spouses: Countess Mária Esterházy (m. 1915; div. 1920) Dorothy Deacon (ex-Princess Radziwiłł) (m. 1922; div. 1928) Eleanor Roelker Tweed (m. 1928; div. 1934) Countess Etti von Wurmbrand-Stuppach (ex-Mrs. Ryan) (m. 1935; div. 1937) Louise Levêque de Vilmorin (m. 1938; div. 1943) Edith Hoch (m. 1946; div. 1949) Countess Marie-Therese von Herberstein (m. 1951; div. 1956) Carin Braun von Stumm (m. 1956)
- Children: 3
- Parent(s): Janos Pálffy ab Erdöd; Elisabeth von Schlippenbach

Count Franz Paul Rudolf Maria Josef Pálffy ab Erdöd (12 February 1890 – 11 October 1968) was a Hungarian aristocrat, landowner, and author best known for his eight marriages.

== Early life ==
Franz Paul Rudolf Maria Josef was born on 12 February 1890 in Vienna into the Pálffy ab Erdöd family, an Austro-Hungarian noble family of which several members of the family held significant positions in the Habsburg monarchy. He was the son of Count Janos Pálffy ab Erdöd (1857–1934) and Countess Elisabeth von Schlippenbach (1872–1938). His parents divorced in 1900 and his mother, who died in a car accident in 1938, remarried to Don Alfredo, Prince Dentice di Frasso, who died in a plane crash in 1940.

His paternal grandparents were Count Moritz Pálffy ab Erdöd, a Knight of the Golden Fleece, and Countess Paulina von Wilczek. His maternal grandparents were Count Arthur von Schlippenbach and Luise von Drasche-Wartinberg. In 1926, his cousin, Count Joseph Palffy-Daun, Prince of Teano, attempted suicide following his divorce from his second wife, Countess Erdödy de Monyorókerék et Monoszló. Another cousin, Count Fidél Pálffy (the former Hungarian Minister of Agriculture), was sentenced to death as a Fascist war criminal in 1945.

== Career ==
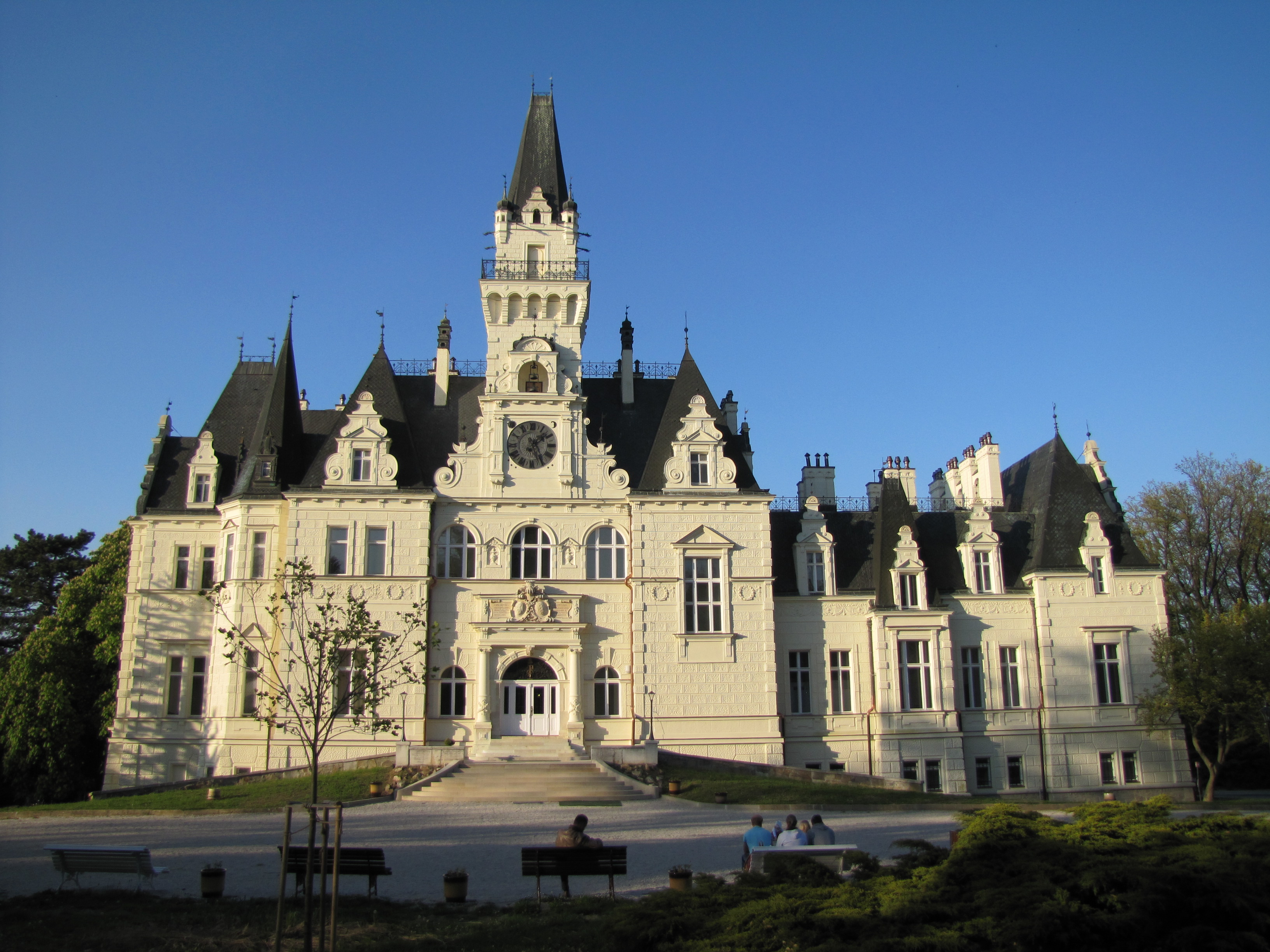
Budmerice Castle

In addition to owning several estates around Hungary and Czechoslovakia, Count Pálffy was a part owner of the Three Hussars, a fashionable Vienna nightclub. His preferred residence, however, was Pudmerice Castle near Bratislava in the Carpathians (today in southwestern Slovakia), built in 1889.

At the end of World War II, Pálffy abandoned all his possessions and went into exile in Western Europe fleeing the Soviet occupation. In 1961, Count Pálffy published: Cinquante ans de chasse: 1900-1950 (Fifty Years of Hunting), a memoir, in German, of his lifelong fascination with hunting and a "vibrant tribute to wild nature." It was republished in 2021 in French.

== Personal life ==
Throughout his lifetime, Count Pálffy married eight times. His first marriage was to Countess Mária Franziska Romana Esterházy de Galántha (1890–1935) on 25 September 1915 in Budapest. Countess Maria was a daughter of Count Moritz Esterházy de Galántha and Countess Pauline von Stockau. They were divorced in December 1920 and she married Prince Béla Odescalchi, in 1924.

His second marriage was on 15 January 1922 to American heiress Dorothy Evelyn "Dolly" Deacon (1891–1960) in Rome, the divorced wife of Prince Albert Radziwiłł (a grandson of Prince Antoni Wilhelm Radziwiłł). She was the youngest daughter of Edward Parker Deacon and sister to Gladys Spencer-Churchill, Duchess of Marlborough. Before their divorce in 1928, they were the parents of:

- Count Janos Miklos "John" Pálffy ab Erdöd (b. 1922), who married Lila Kerr, a daughter of Frank Kerr and Eliane Ines de Loriol (daughter of Perceval de Loriol), in 1960.
- Countess Clara(Caja) Charlotte Edith Helene Pálffy ab Erdöd (b. 1927), who married Sam Fischer Hays in 1947. They divorced in 1950 and she married Silvano Valtorta de Ceroni in 1953.

On 25 August 1928, he married American author Eleanor Jenckes (née Roelker) Tweed (1890–1952) in Turnov, Czechoslovakia. The former wife of lawyer and civic leader Harrison Tweed, Eleanor was the daughter of Rhode Island politician William Greene Roelker and Eleanor (née Jenckes) Roelker. From her first marriage, she had two children, Eleanor Tweed, who married Nelson W. Aldrich (a grandson of U.S. Senator Nelson W. Aldrich); and Katharine Winthrop Tweed, married Archibald Bulloch Roosevelt Jr. (a grandson of U.S. President Theodore Roosevelt). They divorced in 1934.

In 1935, he married, as his fourth wife, his "childhood sweetheart" Etti Ryan (née Countess von Wurmbrand-Stuppach) (1914–2003) in Bratislava. Etti, who was married and divorced from American heir Clendenin J. Ryan, was the elder daughter of Count Ferdinand von Wurmbrand-Stuppach and his wife, the former May Baltazzi. They lived in Slovakia and their life was taken up with tiger hunts in India; they both became good shots, killing stags, elephants, and antelopes. They attended the World Exposition of Shooting at Berlin, hosted by Hermann Göring. Shortly afterwards, Pálffy became smitten with writer Louise de Vilmorin in Paris, which led to their divorce in December 1937.

After his divorce from Etti, he married the French writer Louise Levêque de Vilmorin (1902–1969), the younger daughter of Philippe de Vilmorin, in Bratislava on 27 January 1938. She had previously been married to American real-estate heir Henry Leigh Hunt (the only son of Leigh S. J. Hunt), with whom she had three daughters. They divorced in 1943 and Louise began a relationship with Pálffy's fourth wife's third husband, Count Paul Esterházy de Galántha, who was also a relative of Pálffy's first wife.

On 12 August 1946, he married German Edith Hoch (b. 1923) in the northern Italian city of Merano. They divorced in 1949.

On 28 March 1951, he married Countess Marie-Therese von Herberstein (b. 1928) in Paris. She was a daughter of Friedrich, Count of Herberstein-Proskau (heir of Joseph Franz, Prince of Dietrichstein) and Baroness Elisabeth Korb von Weidenheim. They divorced five years later in 1956.

His eighth, and final, marriage was to Carin Braun von Stumm (1923–2008) on 28 June 1956 in Munich. She was a daughter of Dr. Gunther Braun von Stumm and Mira von Keudell. Together, they were the parents of one son:

- Count Andor Paul Joseph Nikolaus Pálffy ab Erdöd (b. 1957)

Count Pálffy died in Munich on 11 October 1968.
