= Beyond the Woods =

- Film poster
- Directed by: Seán Breathnach
- Written by: Seán Breathnach
- Produced by: Seán Breathnach
- Starring: John Ryan Howard; Irene Kelleher; Claire Loy; Alan Riordan; Ruth Hayes; Ross Mac Mahon; Seán McGillicuddy; Mark Lawrence
- Cinematography: Páraic English
- Production company: Ego Productions Ireland
- Distributed by: Left Films
- Release dates: October 2016 (Indie Cork Film Festival); 28 February 2018
- Running time: 82 minutes
- Country: Ireland
- Language: English

Beyond the Woods is a 2016 Irish horror film, written and directed by Sean Breathnach. and distributed internationally by Left Films It was shot in County Cork, Ireland.

== Plot ==
Beyond The Woods is a supernatural horror film set in a secluded holiday home on the eve of the opening of a mysterious fiery sinkhole that locals are calling "The Gates of Hell". Marissa and Jason invited their friends to Marissa's father's old house, which is now used as a holiday home. As the weekend progresses some of the friends start acting out of character. A few of them get very amorous. One of them disappears. One gets lost in the woods.

== Reception ==
Glenn Tolle of Rue Morgue wrote that the film was "disorienting, at times brilliant, at others inept, always strange", and described it as "an indie exercise in derealization".

== Release ==
Beyond the Woods premiered October 2016 at the Indie Cork Film Festival in Ireland, and won Best Feature (International) at the UVHFF in London. It was released in February 2018 on DVD.

"Beyond the Woods" was also nominated for "Best Thriller" at the National Film Awards UK in 2019
