= Edward Parker Deacon =

American heir and murderer

Edward Parker Deacon (October 2, 1844 – July 5, 1901) was an American heir known for killing his wife's lover in her apartments at Cannes, France.

== Early life ==
Deacon was born in Paris on October 2, 1844, the "descendant of an old and once distinguished family" from Boston. His parents were Edward Preble Deacon (1813–1851) and Sarah Annabella (née Parker) Deacon (1821–1900). He had a brother named Austin Deacon. His father had served as an attaché of the U.S. Legation in Paris under General Lewis Cass.

His paternal grandparents were Commodore David Deacon and Anna Hutchinson Deacon. His maternal grandparents were Peter Parker and Elizabeth Allston (née Read) Parker. His maternal aunt, Ellen Parker, was the wife of Albert Gallatin Van Zandt, and his uncle, Harleston Parker, married Adeline Ellen Reynolds and was the father of architect J. Harleston Parker.

== Personal life ==
On April 29, 1879, he married Florence Baldwin (1859–1919) in New York City. Florence, who spent much of her life in Rome, was the daughter of Rear Admiral Charles Henry Baldwin and Pamelia Caroline (née Tolfree) Baldwin. Before their eventual divorce, (Note: In his application for divorce, Deacon claimed that "at St. Moritz, Switzerland during August and September, 1891, Mrs. Deacon was guilty of improper conduct with Emile Abeille, known by the assumed name of Edmond Adam and Payella. It is also alleged that Mrs. Deacon was guilty of improper conduct with Abeille at various places in Italy in 1891, at 12 Rue de Penthièvre, Paris in December 1891, and January, 1892; at the Hôtel de Noailles, Marseille, in January and February, 1892: at the Hôtel Windsor at Cannes, in February, 1892, and at the Hôtel Splendide, at Cannes, in January 1892.") they were the parents of four girls (and one boy who died in infancy):

- Gladys Marie Deacon (1881–1977), who married Charles Spencer-Churchill, 9th Duke of Marlborough in 1921 after his divorce from Consuelo Vanderbilt. (Note: She was rumoured to have been engaged to Wilhelm, German Crown Prince, Hermann von Keyserling, and to Henry Fitzalan-Howard, 15th Duke of Norfolk.)
- Ida Audrey Deacon (1884–1904), who died unmarried at age 19 of heart disease.
- Edith Florence Deacon (1887–1965), who was engaged to George Lee Peabody but he died before they married; she later married Henry Gunther Gray, son of John Clinton Gray, in 1919.
- Dorothy Evelyn Deacon (1891–1960), who married Prince Albert Radziwiłł, a grandson of Prince Antoni Wilhelm Radziwiłł, in 1910. They divorced and she married Count Paul Pálffy ab Erdöd; (Note: Count Paul Pálffy ab Erdöd (1890–1968) was married to eight different woman throughout his life, including Etti Ryan (née Countess von Wurmbrand-Stuppach), Louise de Saint-Exupéry (née Vilmorin).) they also divorced.

=== Manslaughter and imprisonment ===
On February 19, 1892, Deacon discovered Emile Abeille, his wife's lover, in his wife's apartments at the Hôtel Splendide at Cannes. After breaking down the door to the apartment, Abeille hid behind a chair and Deacon shot several times, killing the man. Deacon, who surrendered to the police immediately after the shooting, had "the sympathy of the entire American colony," and was released on 10,000 francs bail. When Edward surrendered himself to the court, Florence left France "in order to avoid the possibility of being subpoeaned as a witness at the trial." "In court at Nice a verdict of manslaughter was handed in and Mr. Deacon was sentenced to one year's imprisonment."

Deacon was "confined in the prison adjacent to the Palace of Justice" in Nice, France, where he was "entertained like a guest," After he was released from prison, he was pardoned by President Sadi Carnot, Edward and Florence were divorced in 1893, and Edward was awarded custody of the three older children. He took them to the United States, where he remained for the next three years.

=== Mental illness and death ===
Deacon became mentally unstable and in 1899 he was "sent to the McLean Hospital for the Insane. He was at Newport when his derangement was first noticed and was expelled from a reading room there because he persisted in taking ice from a water pitcher to cool his head." Deacon died at McLean Hospital in Belmont, Massachusetts on July 5, 1901. After a funeral at Trinity Church, Newport, he was interred at Island Cemetery. Shortly before his own death, he "came into possession, through the death of his mother, of a large trust fund." His estate was left in four equal shares to his children with William P. Blake of Boston as executor.

Deacon and her sisters returned to France to live with their mother.
