= Standing Mercury =

Sculpture by Auguste Rodin

- French: Mercure debout
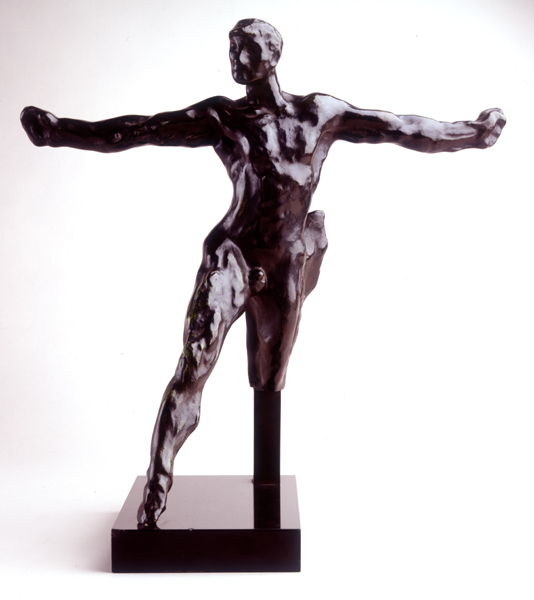
- Artist: Auguste Rodin
- Year: 1888
- Type: Sculpture
- Medium: Bronze
- Subject: Mercury
- Dimensions: 36 cm × 37.8 cm × 20.6 cm (14 in × 14.9 in × 8.1 in)
- Location: Museo Soumaya, Mexico City

Standing Mercury is a bronze sculpture by French artist Auguste Rodin, first exhibited in 1888. Rodin depicts the mythological god Mercury, son of Maia and Jupiter—messenger of the gods and guide to the Underworld—as a young man, representing eloquence and reason. This depiction is opposite to the traditional representation of Hermes, its Greek counterpart, as a mature man.

== Description ==
Descending from high above, Mercury barely touches the ground with his toe and his body rests lightly on it with outstretched arms and vigorous musculature. This sculpture is based on Fauness, which can be seen at the top right of the maquettes for The Gates of Hell. The missing part of Mercury's body is embedded on a cloud or mound, however, curator John L. Tancock affirms that in early sketches for The Gates, Mercury emerged from the rocks.

== Gates of Hell ==
Mercury was placed on the right side of The Gates upside down. Due to Rodin's humanist preferences, the messenger of the gods doesn't have its characteristic winged feet, but is depicted more like a mortal man. In the sculptural group, Mercury is no longer a deity, but another soul among the multitude waiting to be cast to the abyss.

== Praise ==
For Camille Claudel, Rodin's pupil and lover, the graceful ease of this piece made it one of the "happiest" ones of the artist.

== Inspiration ==
Standing Mercury was also used by Rodin as inspiration for his Study of Apollo, one of the pieces on the base of the monument to Domingo Faustino Sarmiento, former Argentinean president.
