= Sodium (horse) =

Irish-bred Thoroughbred racehorse

- Sire: Psidium
- Grandsire: Pardal
- Dam: Gambade
- Damsire: Big Game
- Sex: Stallion
- Foaled: 1963
- Country: Ireland
- Colour: Bay
- Breeder: Kilcarn Stud
- Owner: Radha Sigtia
- Trainer: George Todd
- Record: 17: 3-3-2 (incomplete)

Major wins
- Irish Derby (1966); St Leger Stakes (1966)

Awards
- Timeform rating 128

Sodium (1963–1983) was an Irish-bred, British-trained Thoroughbred racehorse and sire best known for winning the classic St Leger Stakes in 1966. After running well without winning in 1965 he improved to become one of the best European colts of his generation in 1966 when he developed a rivalry with Charlottown. Sodium finished fourth behind Charlottown in The Derby but reversed the form to win both the Irish Derby and St Leger. He failed to reproduce his best form as a four-year-old and was retired to stud, where he had little success as a sire of winners in France and Japan.

== Background ==
Sodium was a bay horse bred by the Kilcarn Stud near Navan in County Meath, Ireland. He was from the first crop of foals sired by Psidium the 66/1 winner of the 1961 Epsom Derby. Sodium's dam Gambade showed no ability as a racehorse, but came from a successful family, being a full sister to the 1953 Oaks winner Ambiguity. As a yearling Sodium was offered for sale and bought for 3,500 guineas by the veteran British trainer George Todd on behalf the Indian textile importer Radha Sigtia. Todd trained the colt at Manton in Wiltshire.

== Racing career ==
=== 1965: two-year-old season ===
Sodium ran four times as a two-year-old in 1965 but failed to win a race. He showed some promise racing over one mile in autumn, finishing second to the filly Soft Angels in the Royal Lodge Stakes at Ascot Racecourse and fourth to Pretendre in the Observer Gold Cup at Doncaster.

=== 1966: three-year-old season ===
On his first appearance as a three-year-old, Sodium was moved up in distance and finished third to Right Noble in the White Rose Stakes over one and a half miles at Ascot in April. He then recorded his first victory when winning the Derby Trial Stakes at Brighton Racecourse from Crisp and Even.

In the Derby at Epsom Downs Racecourse Sodium was expected to run well by his trainer and started at odds of 13/1 in a field of twenty-five runners. Ridden by the Liverpool-born jockey Frankie Durr, the colt looked to be travelling strongly two furlongs from the finish but weakened in the closing stages and finished fourth, beaten a total of seven lengths behind Charlottown, Pretendre and Black Prince. His disappointing finish was attributed by some to his becoming highly agitated ("he worked himself into a lather") in the paddock before the race. Sodium met Charlottown for the second time in the Irish Derby at the Curragh. Starting at odds of 9/1 he took the lead from Paveh early in the straight and held the late challenge of Charlottown to win by a length. Two weeks later, Sodium started 6/4 favourite for Britain's most prestigious all-aged race the King George VI and Queen Elizabeth Stakes at Ascot. He finished second of the five runners, beaten half a length by the four-year-old filly Aunt Edith.

Sodium prepared for a run in the St Leger Stakes by running in a highly anticipated race for the thirteen furlong Oxfordshire Stakes at Newbury Racecourse on 13 August. He ran very poorly, and finished in third place, thirteen lengths behind Charlottown. A subsequent veterinary examination revealed that the colt had been suffering from a kidney ailment. Sodium and Charlottown met or the fourth time in just over three months in the St Leger on 7 September. The Derby winner was favoured in the betting, with Sodium starting at odds of 7/1. Durr restrained the Irish Derby winner in the early stages as Black Prince led the field of nine runners. Charlottown took the lead in the straight, but Sodium produced a strong late run to catch his rival in the final strides to win by a head. It was a first British classic win both for Durr and for George Todd, who had been training racehorses for thirty-eight years.

=== 1967: four-year-old season ===
Sodium stayed in training, but failed to win in six races which included the Coronation Cup (sixth behind Charlottown), the Hardwicke Stakes (second to Salvo).

== Assessment ==
In their book A Century of Champions, John Randall and Tony Morris rated Sodium an "average" St Leger winner. The independent Timeform organisation rated Sodium on 128, one pound ahead of Charlottown, but the Derby winner was preferred in the voting for British Horse of the Year by 176 votes to 174.

== Stud record ==
At the end of his racing career, Sodium, was sold for approximately £100,000 and was exported to stand as a breeding stallion in France. The best of his progeny was Virunga (foaled 1970) a filly who won the Prix de Malleret and finished second in the Yorkshire Oaks. At stud Virunga produced several good winners including Vin de France Prix Jacques le Marois and Vacarme Mill Reef Stakes. Sodium was sold again in 1972 and was sent to Japan, where he had little success before his death in 1983.

== Pedigree ==
Pedigree of Sodium (IRE), bay stallion, 1963
Sire Psidium (GB) 1958	Pardal (FR); 1947	Pharis	Pharos
Sire Psidium (GB) 1958	Pardal (FR); 1947	Pharis	Carissima
Sire Psidium (GB) 1958	Pardal (FR); 1947	Ardagatis	Asterus
Sire Psidium (GB) 1958	Pardal (FR); 1947	Ardagatis	Helene de Troie
Sire Psidium (GB) 1958	Dinarella (ITY); 1947	Niccolo dell'Arca	Coronach
Sire Psidium (GB) 1958	Dinarella (ITY); 1947	Niccolo dell'Arca	Nogara
Sire Psidium (GB) 1958	Dinarella (ITY); 1947	Dagherotipica	Manna
Sire Psidium (GB) 1958	Dinarella (ITY); 1947	Dagherotipica	Dossa Dossi
Dam Gambade (GB) 1951	Big Game (GB); 1939	Bahram	Blandford
Dam Gambade (GB) 1951	Big Game (GB); 1939	Bahram	Friar's Daughter
Dam Gambade (GB) 1951	Big Game (GB); 1939	Myrobella	Tetratema
Dam Gambade (GB) 1951	Big Game (GB); 1939	Myrobella	Dolabella
Dam Gambade (GB) 1951	Amber Flash (GB); 1942	Precipitation	Hurry On
Dam Gambade (GB) 1951	Amber Flash (GB); 1942	Precipitation	Double Life
Dam Gambade (GB) 1951	Amber Flash (GB); 1942	Traffic Light	Solario
Dam Gambade (GB) 1951	Amber Flash (GB); 1942	Traffic Light	Point Duty (Family 1-p)
