= Psidium (horse) =

Irish-bred Thoroughbred racehorse

- Racing silks of Etti Plesch
- Sire: Pardal
- Grandsire: Pharis
- Dam: Dinarella
- Damsire: Niccolo dell’Arca
- Sex: Stallion
- Foaled: 1958
- Country: Ireland
- Colour: Chestnut
- Breeder: Etti Plesch
- Owner: Etti Plesch
- Trainer: Harry Wragg
- Record: 11: 2-2-1
- Earnings: £

Major wins
- Epsom Derby (1961)

Psidium (foaled 1958) was an Irish-bred, British-trained Thoroughbred racehorse and sire. In a racing career that lasted from 1960 to 1961 Psidium ran 11 times and won twice. He is best known for his win, as a 66/1 outsider, in the 1961 Epsom Derby. He later became a successful stallion.

== Background ==
Psidium, a chestnut horse with a narrow white blaze, standing 16.1 hands high, was bred in Ireland by his owner Etti Plesch. His sire Pardal was a high class racehorse who won the Jockey Club Stakes and the Princess of Wales's Stakes. Psidium's dam, the Italian mare Dinarella finished fourth in the Oaks d'Italia and also produced the Poule d'Essai des Poulains winner Thymus. Mme Plesch named all her horses after flowers, with Psidium being named after the guava flower

Psidium was sent into training with Harry Wragg at his Abington Place stable at Newmarket, Suffolk.

== Racing career ==
=== 1960: Two-year-old season ===
Psidium ran seven times as a two-year-old in 1960. He won the Duke of Edinburgh Stakes at Kempton and finished third in the Dewhurst Stakes at Newmarket and the Horris Hill Stakes at Newbury. In the Free Handicap, an assessment of the year's best two-year-olds, Psidium was given a rating of 116 lb, 17 lb below the top weight Opaline.

=== 1961: Three-year-old season ===
On his three-year-old debut, Psidium finished third in the 2000 Guineas Trial at Kempton. He then finished 18th of the 22 runners behind Rockavon in the 2000 Guineas. For his next start, he was sent to France for the Prix Daru over 2100 m, in which he finished fourth behind Moutiers. He was ridden in the race by Lester Piggott, who expressed his view that Psidium did not stay the distance.

At Epsom, Psidium was ridden by French jockey Roger Poincelet. He was not considered a serious contender, starting at odds of 66/1 in a field of 28. The race was run on rock-hard ground in front of a crowd estimated at 250,000, which included the Queen and the Queen Mother. Psidium was held up towards the back of the field, and was not in contention when the leaders turned into the straight. In the final quarter of a mile, Poincelet moved Psidium to the wide outside and the colt produced a sudden burst of acceleration to move past the field. He overtook Dicta Drake inside the final furlong and won going away by two lengths, with Poincelet easing down. Mme Plesch was reportedly astonished by her colt's performance, saying that she "never expected he would finish in the first ten." Shortly after his victory, Psidium was injured in training and never ran again.

== Assessment ==
In their book A Century of Champions, John Randall and Tony Morris rated Psidium a "poor" Derby winner.

Timeform awarded Psidium a rating of 130, which is considered the minimum mark for an above average European Group One winner.

== Stud career ==
Psidium stood as a stallion at the Cheveley Park Stud at Newmarket. He was the leading British sire (in winning prize money) in 1966, thanks to the achievements of his son Sodium, which won the Irish Derby and the St Leger. Psidium was exported to Argentina in 1970.

== Pedigree ==
Pedigree of Psidium (IRE), chestnut stallion, 1958
Sire Pardal (FR) 1947	Pharis; 1936	Pharos	Phalaris
Sire Pardal (FR) 1947	Pharis; 1936	Pharos	Scapa Flow
Sire Pardal (FR) 1947	Pharis; 1936	Carissima	Clarissimus
Sire Pardal (FR) 1947	Pharis; 1936	Carissima	Casquetts
Sire Pardal (FR) 1947	Adargatis; 1931	Asterus	Teddy
Sire Pardal (FR) 1947	Adargatis; 1931	Asterus	Astrella
Sire Pardal (FR) 1947	Adargatis; 1931	Helene de Troie	Helicon
Sire Pardal (FR) 1947	Adargatis; 1931	Helene de Troie	Lady of Pedigree
Dam Dinarella (ITY) 1947	Niccolo dell'Arca; 1938	Coronach	Hurry On
Dam Dinarella (ITY) 1947	Niccolo dell'Arca; 1938	Coronach	Wet Kiss
Dam Dinarella (ITY) 1947	Niccolo dell'Arca; 1938	Nogara	Havresac
Dam Dinarella (ITY) 1947	Niccolo dell'Arca; 1938	Nogara	Catnip
Dam Dinarella (ITY) 1947	Dagherotipia; 1936	Manna	Phalaris
Dam Dinarella (ITY) 1947	Dagherotipia; 1936	Manna	Waffles
Dam Dinarella (ITY) 1947	Dagherotipia; 1936	Dossa Dossi	Spike Island
Dam Dinarella (ITY) 1947	Dagherotipia; 1936	Dossa Dossi	Delleana(Family: 14)
