= Charles H. Baldwin House =

Historic house

- U.S. National Register of Historic Places
- U.S. National Historic Landmark District – Contributing property
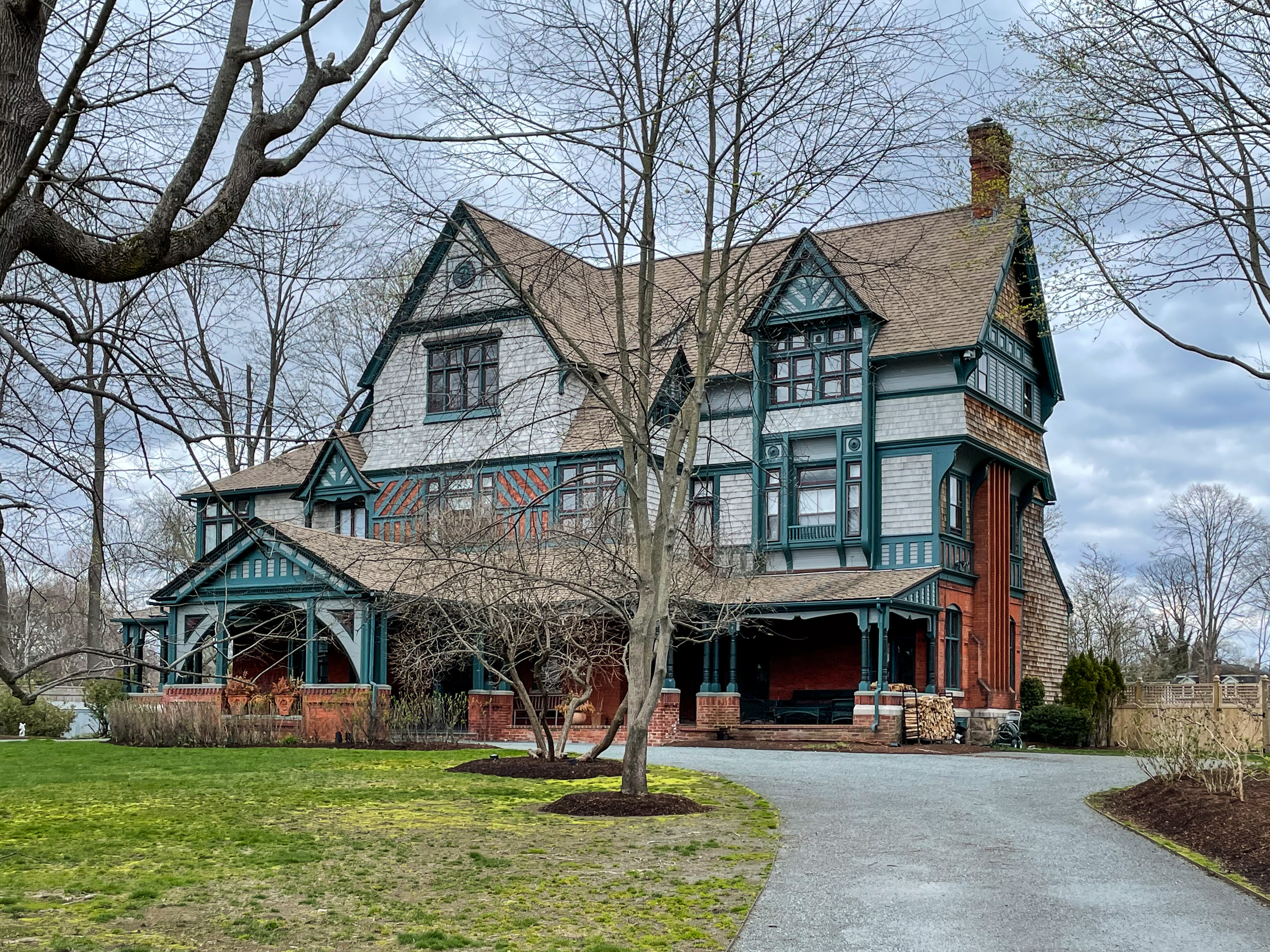
- Charles H. Baldwin House, April 2022

- Location within Rhode Island Location within the United States
- Location: Bellevue Avenue, opposite Perry Street, in Newport, Rhode Island; United States
- Coordinates: 41°28′44″N 71°18′31″W
- Area: 2 acres (0.81 ha)
- Built: 1877
- Architect: Potter & Robinson
- Architectural style: Queen Anne; Shingle Style
- Part of: Bellevue Avenue Historic District (ID72000023)
- NRHP reference No.: 71000018

Significant dates
- Added to NRHP: May 06, 1971
- Designated NHLDCP: December 8, 1972

Charles H. Baldwin House is a historic house on Bellevue Avenue in Newport, Rhode Island, United States, that is part of the Bellevue Avenue Historic District, but is individually listed on the National Register of Historic Places (NRHP).

== Description ==
The house is a 2 1/2-story wood-frame structure, finished on the exterior in brick, clapboards, and shingles. It was designed by William Appleton Potter and Robert Anderson and built in 1877–78, and is an excellent example of a transitional style between the Queen Anne and Shingle styles. The building features the asymmetrical and busy massing, with many gables, an extended porch with turned columns, and brick chimneys with decorative tops. The house was built for United States Navy Admiral Charles H. Baldwin as a summer house.

The house was listed on the NRHP December 8, 1971.

== See also ==
- National Register of Historic Places listings in Newport County, Rhode Island
