= Kneeling Female Faun =

1884 sculpture by Auguste Rodin

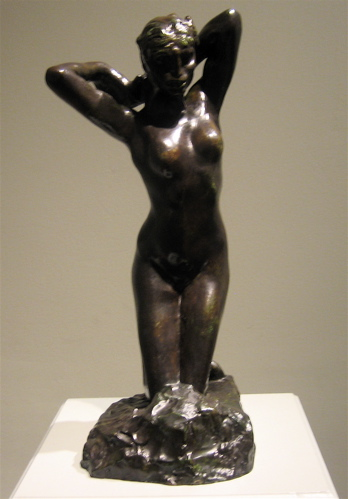
- Bronze cast at the Los Angeles County Museum of Art
- Artist: Auguste Rodin
- Year: 1884

Kneeling Female Faun (French: Femme Faune agenouillée) is a sculpture by the French artist Auguste Rodin. A variant of his work The Martyr, it is made of bronze. It was originally conceived in 1884 and exhibited in 1889 in Georges Petit's gallery.

== Versions ==
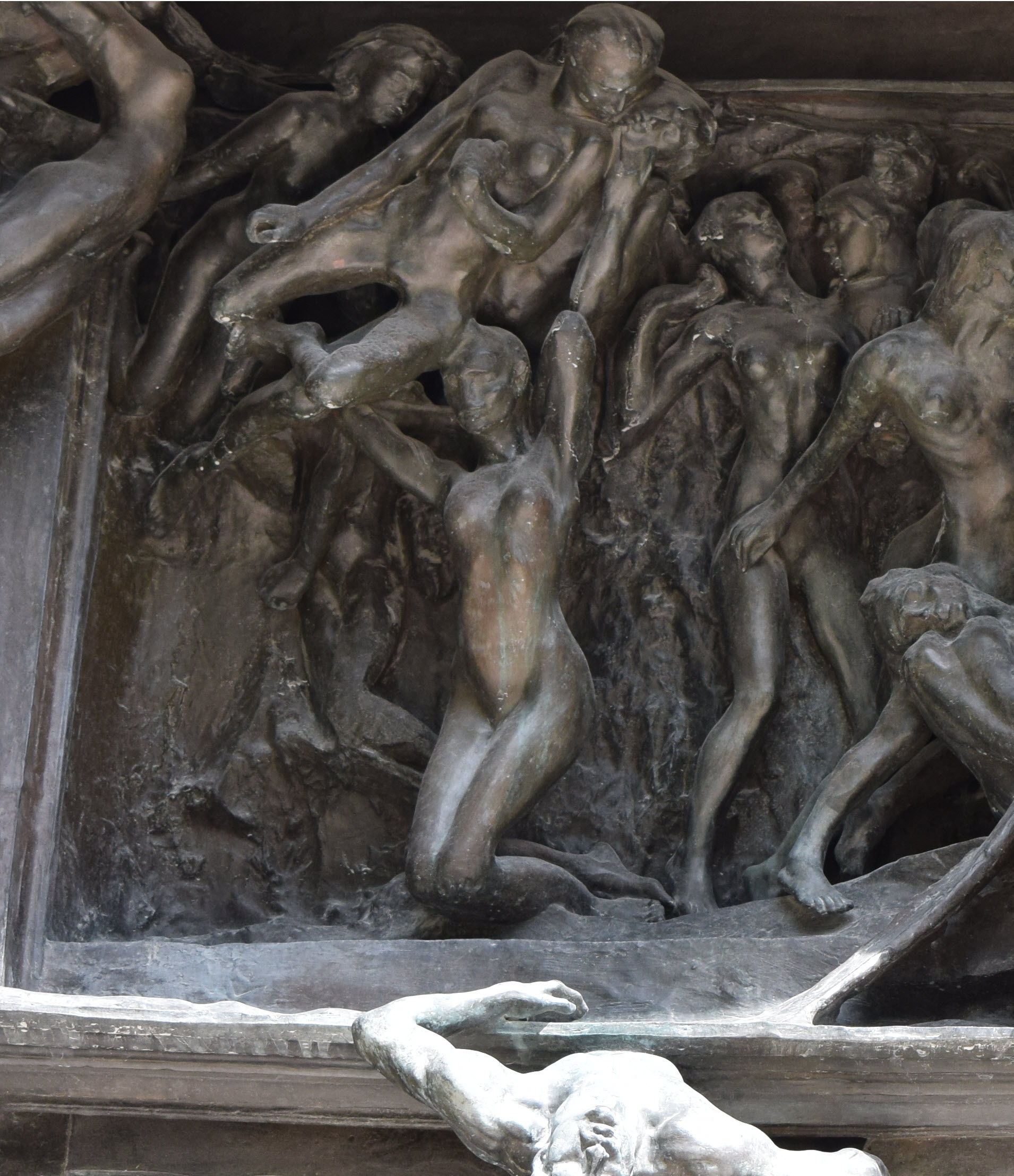
Detail of the Gates of Hell

It exists in two contemporary variants. The first has animal features and an upright head, whilst the second leans her head to the right with a sweeter expression. Both were possibly modelled on Carmen Visconti from Fiesole in Italy, who modelled for Rodin between 1880 and 1893. It was used in the left half of the top panel of his The Gates of Hell.

== See also ==
- Standing Female Faun
- List of sculptures by Auguste Rodin
