= Standing Female Faun =

Sculpture by Auguste Rodin

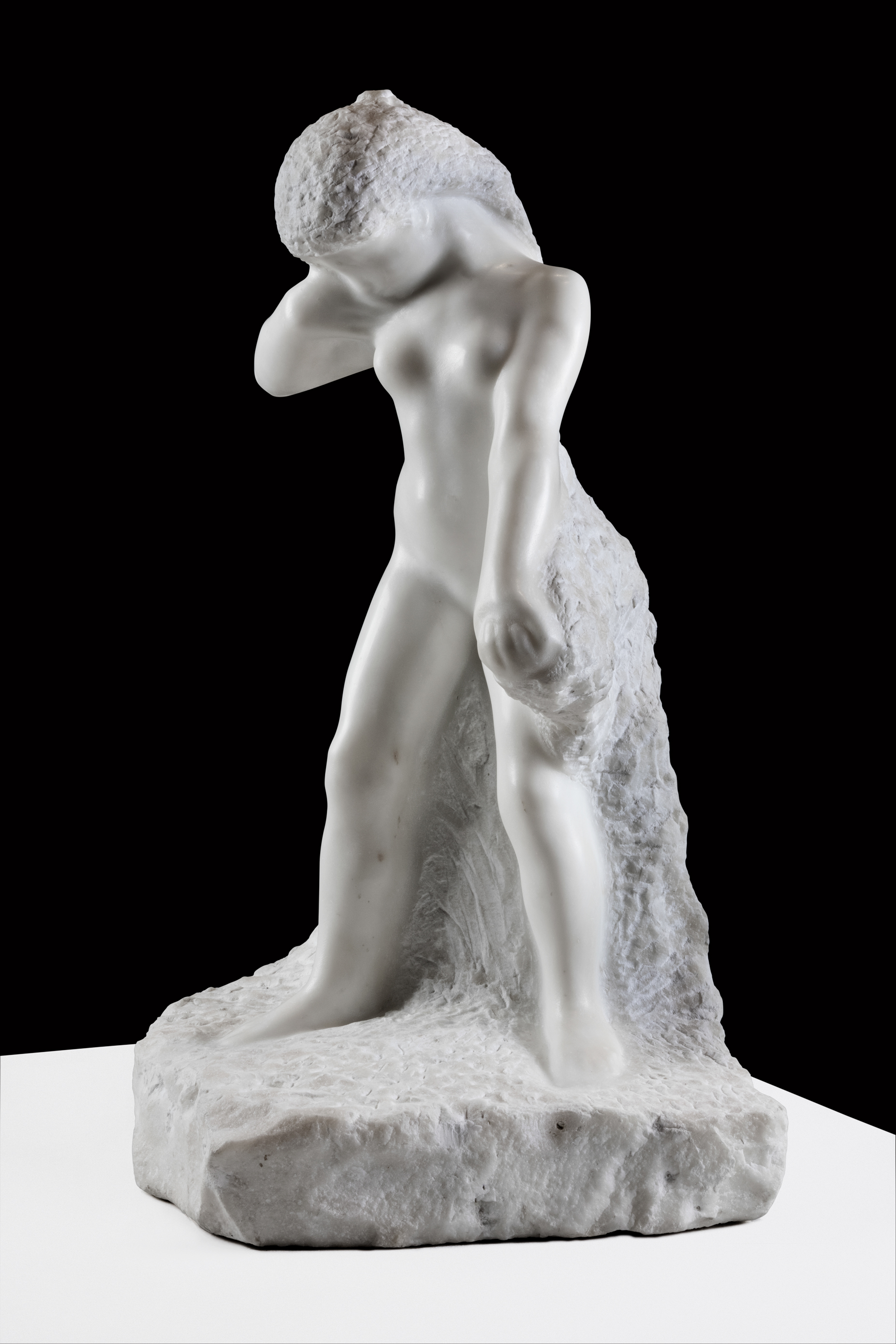
- Standing Faunesse in Museo Soumaya
- Artist: Auguste Rodin
- Year: 1910
- Medium: white marble

Standing Female Faun or Standing Fauness is a sculpture by Auguste Rodin in 1910. It is sculpted from white marble and its dimensions are 70.1 x 44.7 x 38.4 cm.

== Description ==
The work represents the conception of a being of hybrid nature which is half human and half ram. On the left-hand-side of the base it is signed "A Miss Gladys Deacon / Auguste Rodin", testifying to the close relationship between the artist and Gladys Deacon.

== See also ==
- List of sculptures by Auguste Rodin
- Kneeling Female Faun
