= Fugitive Love =

Sculpture by Auguste Rodin

- L'amour Fugitive (French)
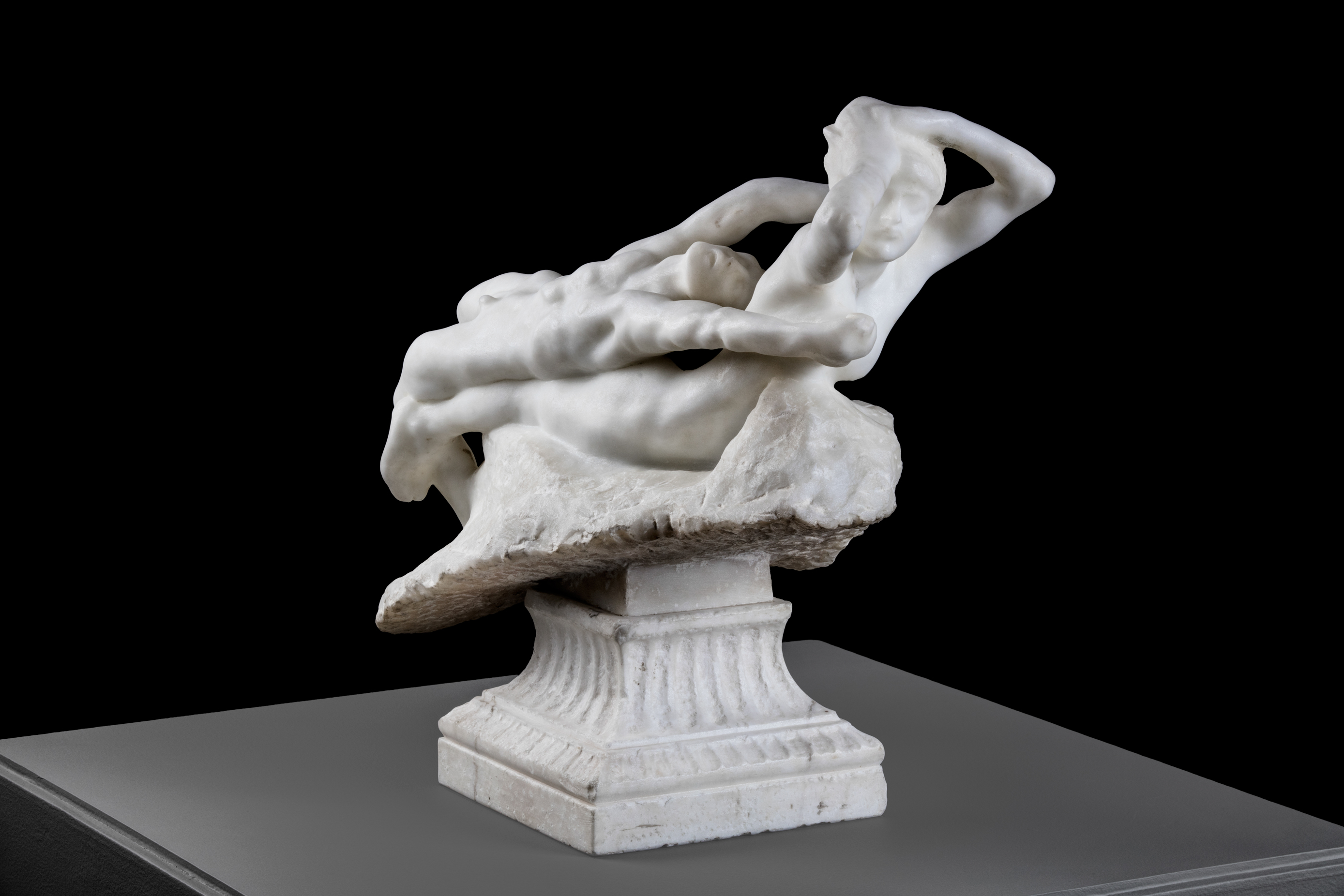
- Fugitive Love in white marble
- Artist: Auguste Rodin
- Year: 1886
- Type: sculpture
- Medium: marble, bronze
- Dimensions: 43.6 cm × 49.8 cm × 29.7 cm (17.7 in × 19.6 in × 11.7 in)
- Location: Museo Soumaya

Fugitive Love is a sculpture by Auguste Rodin made between 1886 and 1887, both sculpted in marble and cast in bronze. It represents a man and a woman embracing each other on top of a rock. More specifically, the author was inspired by the story of Francesca da Rimini's love affair with Paolo Malatesta, an allusion to Dante Alighieri's depiction of lust on the second circle of Hell in his Inferno.

== Gates of hell ==
The sculpture is also part of Rodin's monumental group The Gates of Hell, where it can be found in the right gate. Even though the group was already recognized on its own, Rodin decided to put it in his Gates partly to replace another iconic sculpture: The Kiss which had been removed due to its theme being inconsistent with the rest of the group. (Note: Rodin deemed The Kiss too idyllic and romantic to be depicted in the middle of repentant souls. He decided to take it away from The Gates but was decided to work on it separately.) The sculpture shows a man trying to hold a woman who is trying to escape, whose posture is reminiscent of water or air. This is the "fugitive love".

Fugitive Love appeared in the Georges Petit gallery in 1887. There, it was discovered and appreciated by art critic Gustave Geffroy, who wrote: "the group presents the impatient and fierce race of a woman who carries at her back, as if chained, her victim, an inanimate and rigid man. The woman's back sinks, the man's torso flattens, his legs dangle and an arabesque of limbs is drawn".

The sculpture was exhibited again at the Georges Petit gallery in 1889, along with the exhibition of impressionist artist Claude Monet. It was so acclaimed that it was reproduced both in white marble and bronze.

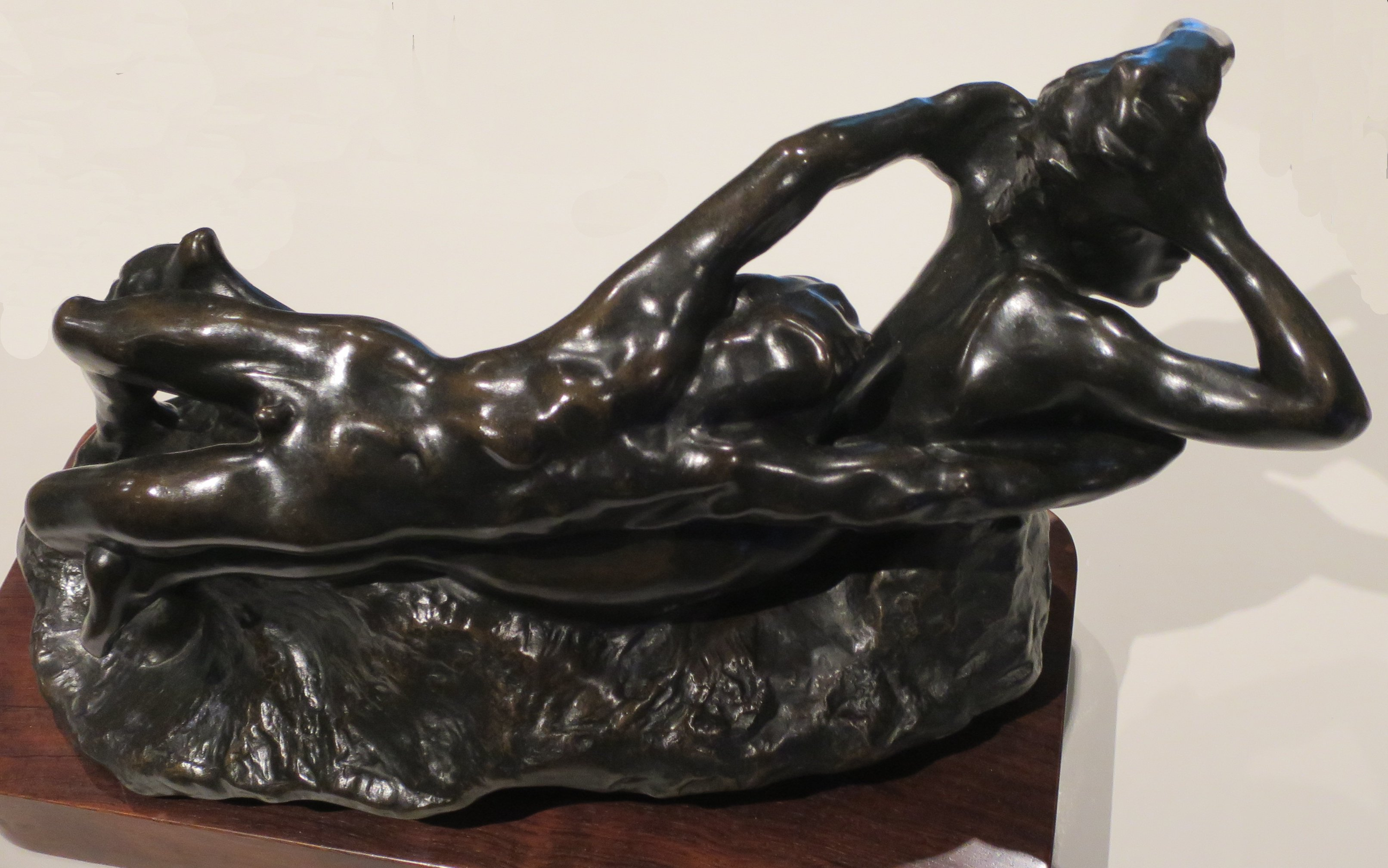
Fugitive Love, Iris and B. Gerald Cantor Foundation

Like other sculptures by Rodin, Fugitive Love is made from joining together other pieces and studies. The man is reminiscent of The prodigal son and was inspired by Rodin's studies for Head of Sorrow (also known as Joan of Arc), while its tragic face comes from Paolo and Francesca.

== See also ==
- List of sculptures by Auguste Rodin
