= Charles H. Baldwin (admiral) =

United States Navy officer (1822–1888)

Rear Admiral Charles Henry Baldwin
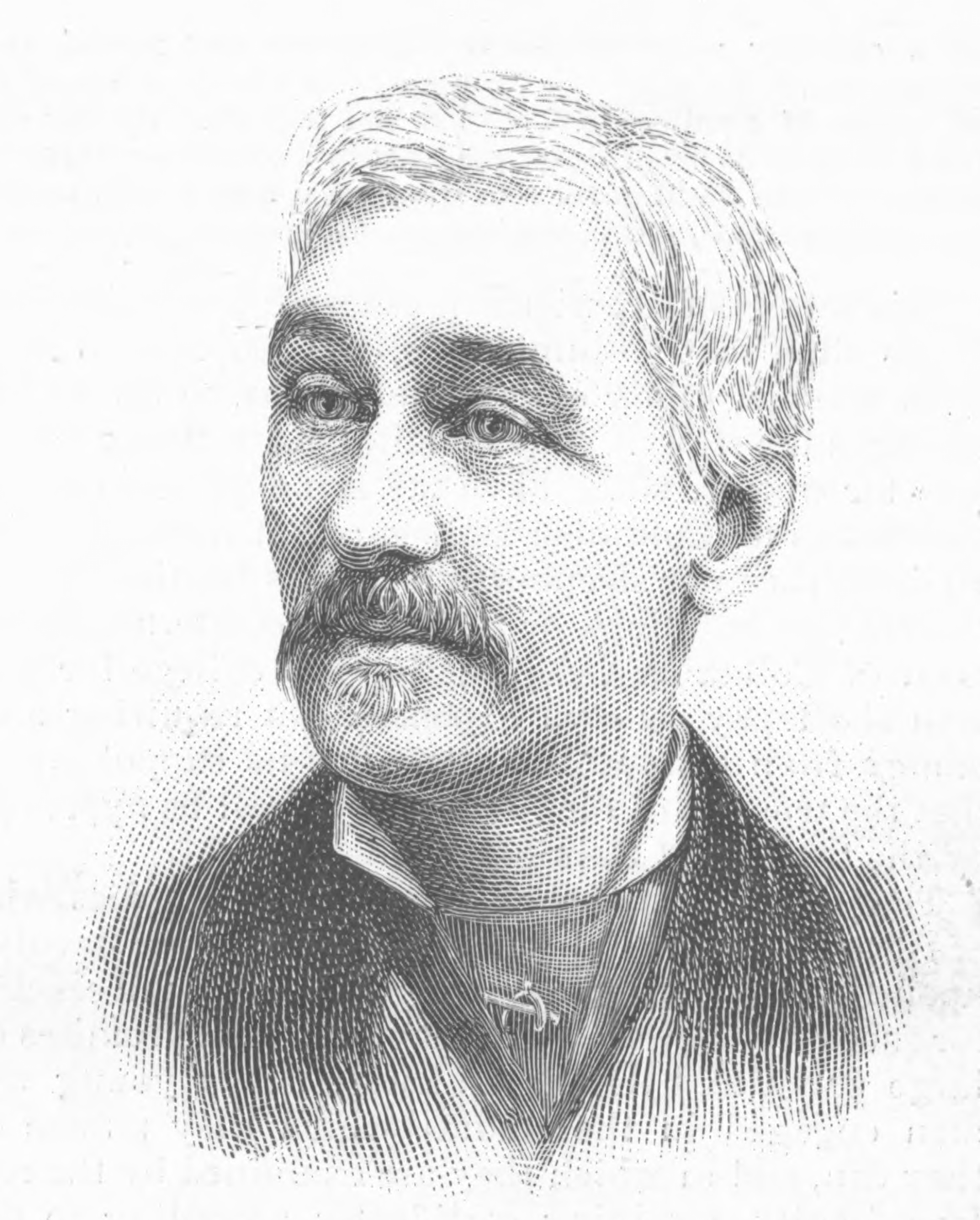
- Born: September 3, 1822; New York City, U.S.
- Died: November 17, 1888 (aged 66)
- Military career
- Allegiance: United States of America
- Branch: United States Navy; Union Navy
- Service years: 1839–1854, 1861–1888
- Rank: Rear admiral
- Commands: USS Clifton; USS Vanderbilt; USS Colorado; European Squadron
- Conflicts: Mexican–American War; American Civil War

Charles Henry Baldwin (September 3, 1822 – November 17, 1888) was an officer in the United States Navy, who served during the Mexican–American War and the American Civil War.

== Biography ==
Born in New York City, he joined the Navy on April 24, 1839, and served as a midshipman aboard the frigate Brandywine (1839–1840) and the sloop Fairfield (1840–1843) in the Mediterranean Squadron, before returning to the U.S. aboard the sloop Vandalia in 1843 to attend the Naval School at Philadelphia, graduating with the rank of passed midshipman on July 2, 1845.

He served through the Mexican–American War on the frigate Congress in the Pacific Squadron, serving on operations around Mazatlán, during the time that it was occupied by U.S. naval forces between November 1847 to June 1848. He received his commission as lieutenant in November 1853, but left the Navy on February 28, 1854.

Baldwin re-entered the naval service in 1861, on the outbreak of the Civil War, with the rank of acting-lieutenant. In February 1862 he commissioned the steamer Clifton, and sailed from New York to Ship Island for duty with the Mortar Flotilla of the West Gulf Blockading Squadron. In April, during the Battle of Forts Jackson and St. Philip, Clifton towed 21 mortar schooners into the Mississippi River, and supported them as they bombarded the fortifications below New Orleans. The next month, after the capture of the city, the ship sailed upriver to Vicksburg, Mississippi, where it was damaged by enemy gunfire.

Baldwin was promoted to commander in November 1862, given command of the steamer Vanderbilt in early 1863 and ordered to hunt down the notorious Confederate commerce raider CSS Alabama. Over the next year Baldwin took his ship to the West Indies, the eastern coast of South America, the Cape of Good Hope, St. Helena, Cape Verde, the Canary Islands, Spain and Portugal, but his quarry always eluded him, sometimes only by a few hours. During the voyage Vanderbilt also served as the flagship of Commodore Charles Wilkes Flying Squadron in the West Indies, and captured several British blockade runners, including the Peterhoff. Baldwin eventually returned to New York in January 1864 without ever having sighted the Confederate vessel.

He was then assigned to ordnance duty, serving at the Mare Island Navy Yard in California until 1867. He returned to sea as the Fleet Captain of the North Pacific Squadron in 1868–1869, and received promotion to the rank of captain in 1869. He then served as the Inspector of Ordnance at Mare Island from 1869 to 1871, and commanded the frigate Colorado, flagship of the Asiatic Squadron in 1871–1873. He was commander of the Naval Rendezvous (recruitment station) at San Francisco in 1873, and was commissioned as commodore on August 8, 1876, serving as a Member of the Board of Examiners from 1876 to 1879.

In early 1883 Baldwin was promoted to rear admiral, and assumed command of the European Squadron on 10 March. He then sailed to Kronstadt in his flagship Lancaster, and on 27 May he and his staff attended the coronation of Tsar Alexander III in Moscow.

== Personal life ==
Charles Henry Baldwin was married to a Caroline Permelia Tolfree (1835–1873), by whom he had two children: Charles Adolphe Baldwin (1861–1934) and Florence Baldwin (1859–1918). In 1875, Baldwin married Mary H. Morgan (died 1924). His daughter Florence married Edward Parker Deacon in 1879. Their eldest daughter, Gladys Marie Deacon, married Charles Richard John Spencer-Churchill (1871–1934), the 9th Duke of Marlborough in 1921 who then became the Duchess of Marlborough.

== See also ==
- Charles H. Baldwin House, his summer house in Newport, Rhode Island
