= Eve (Rodin) =

Sculpture by Auguste Rodin

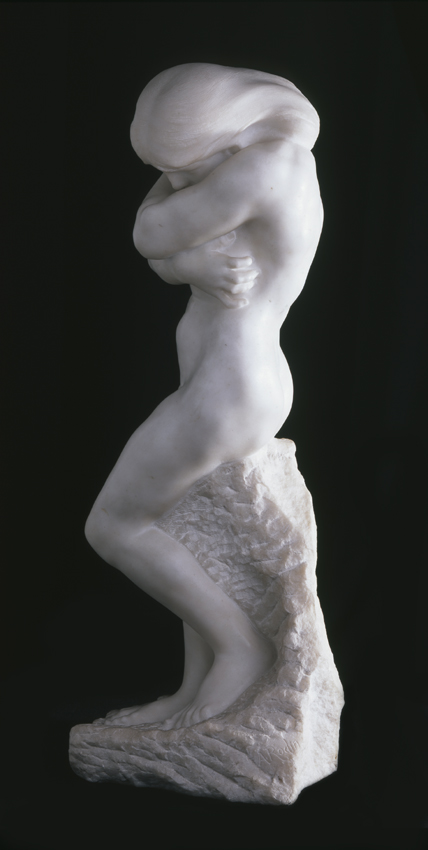
- The Museo Soumaya version
- Artist: Auguste Rodin
- Medium: white marble

Eve is a nude sculpture by the French artist Auguste Rodin. It shows Eve despairing after the Fall.

== Gates of Hell ==
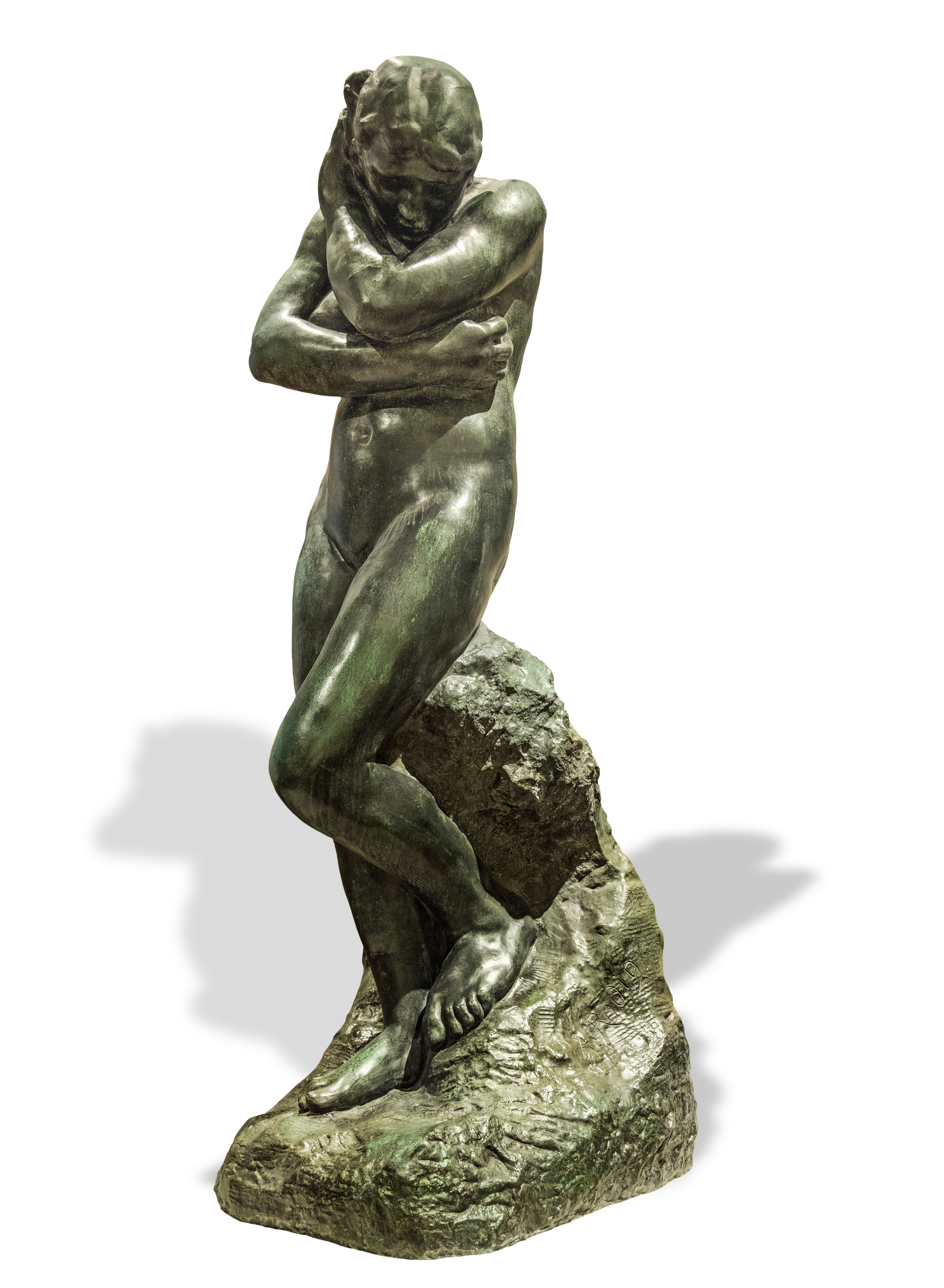
Éve au rocher in bronze, Jardin des Tuileries, Paris

In 1880 Rodin was commissioned to produce The Gates of Hell, for which he exhibited Adam at the 1881 Paris Salon. In a sketch for Gates Rodin showed a central silhouette possibly intended as Eve (both the sketch and Gates are now in the Musée Rodin), but in October 1881 he decided to produce Eve as a pair for Adam, with the two sculptures flanking a huge high-relief bas-relief. This would be the first free-standing female sculpture he had produced since the destruction of his Bacchante in an accident between 1864 and 1870.

== Work ==
He began Eve in 1881, later abandoning his intended colossal version of it when he realised his model, probably Adèle Abruzzesi, was pregnant. It was first exhibited to the public at the 1899 Paris Salon. It shows a strong influence from Michelangelo, picked up by Rodin in Italy in 1876.

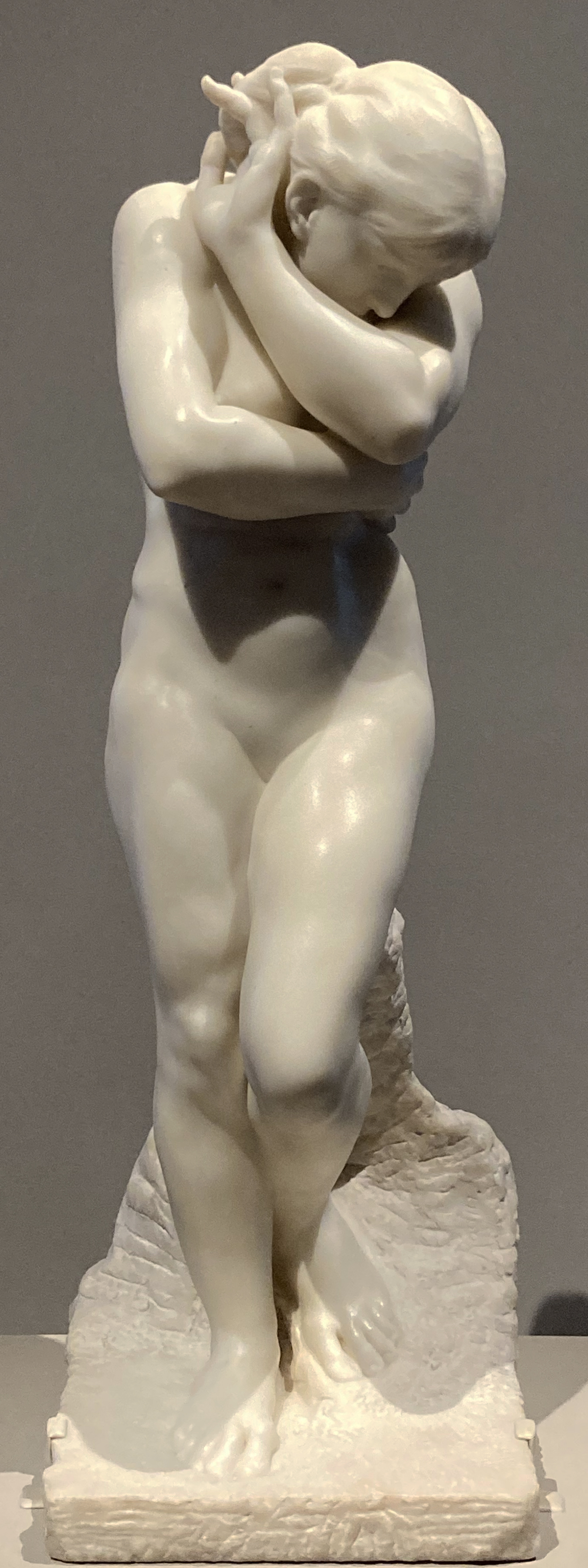
Eve by Rodin, model c. 1881, carved 1890/1891, National Gallery of Art, Washington, DC

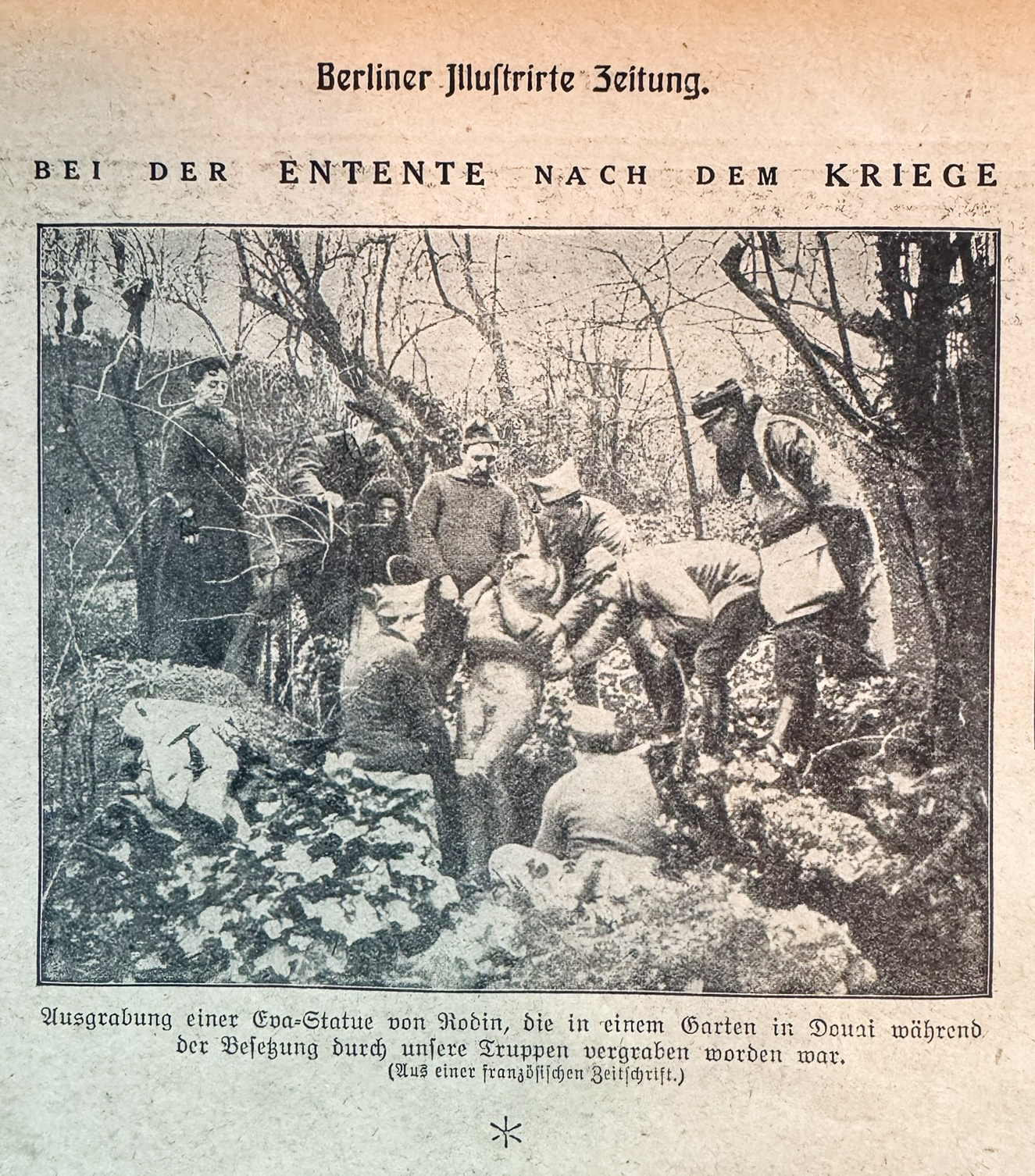
The statue was buried for safekeeping during WWI

He also produced an autograph white marble version in 1884 (now in the Museo Soumaya in Mexico City), a version in patinated plaster and a much-reproduced 71 cm high bronze version in 1883 (known as the Petite Ève or Little Eve, whose original is also in the Musée Rodin in Paris). He also reused the same figure of Eve in his marble Eve and the Serpent (1901) and his plaster Adam and Eve (1884). The statue was buried in Donai during WWI for safekeeping.

== See also ==
- List of sculptures by Auguste Rodin
