= Schlippenbach =

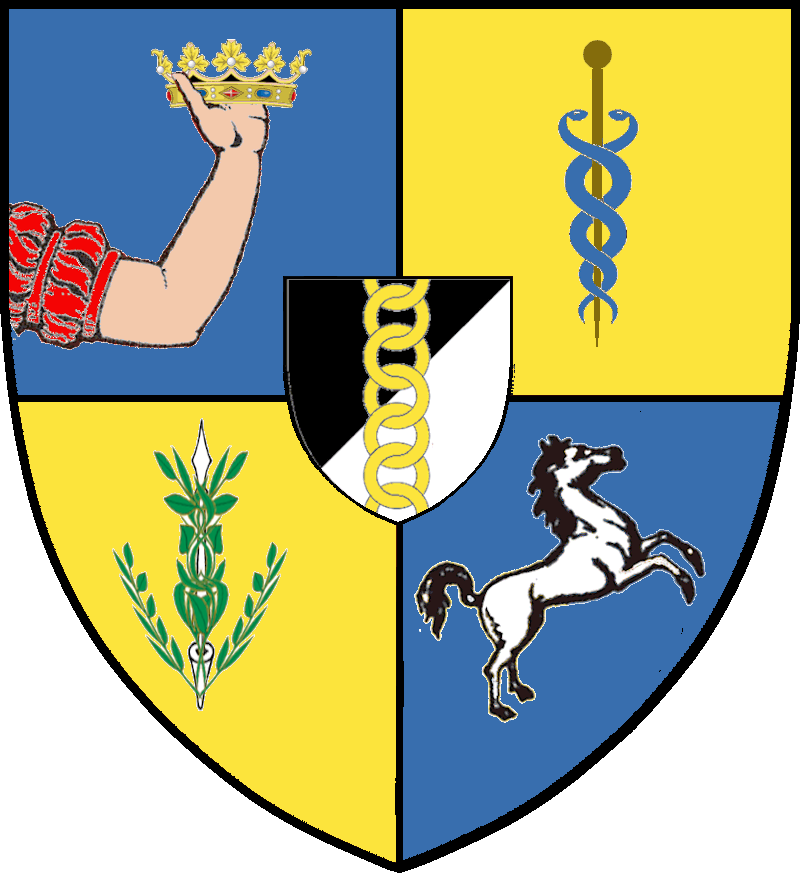
Coat of arms of Counts von Schlippenbach

The Schlippenbach family is an old German noble family first documented in 1386. The name spread throughout Prussia, Sweden, Pomerania and Baltic, whose members held significant political and military positions.

== History ==
First known family members were brothers Hannes, Rotger and Herman Slippenbeke. They were mentioned first in 1386 as knights who were serving under Counts von der Mark and Archbishops of Cologne.

The progenitor of the Baltic branch was Johann von Schlippenbach-Bornhausen, who appears in a document between 1518 and 1542.

The family were awarded with the title of Baron of the Holy Roman Empire in 1768 by Joseph II, as well as Count in Sweden in 1654 by King Charles X Gustav of Sweden, Count in Prussia and Count in Spain in 1711 by King Philip V of Spain.

== Notable members ==
- Alexander von Schlippenbach (born 1938), German jazz pianist and composer
- Wolmar Anton von Schlippenbach (1653–1721), Governor General of Swedish Estonia from 1704 to 1706
