= Gladys Spencer-Churchill, Duchess of Marlborough =

Aristocrat and socialite (1881–1977)

Her Grace The Duchess of Marlborough
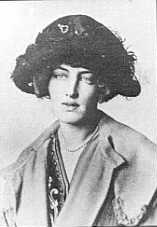
- Deacon in the 1910s

Personal details
- Born: Gladys Marie Deacon; 7 February 1881 Paris, France
- Died: 13 October 1977 (aged 96) Northampton, England
- Spouse: Charles Spencer-Churchill, 9th Duke of Marlborough (m. 1921; died 1934)
- Parent(s): Edward Parker Deacon; Florence Baldwin
- Education: Couvent de l'Assomption, Auteuil, France

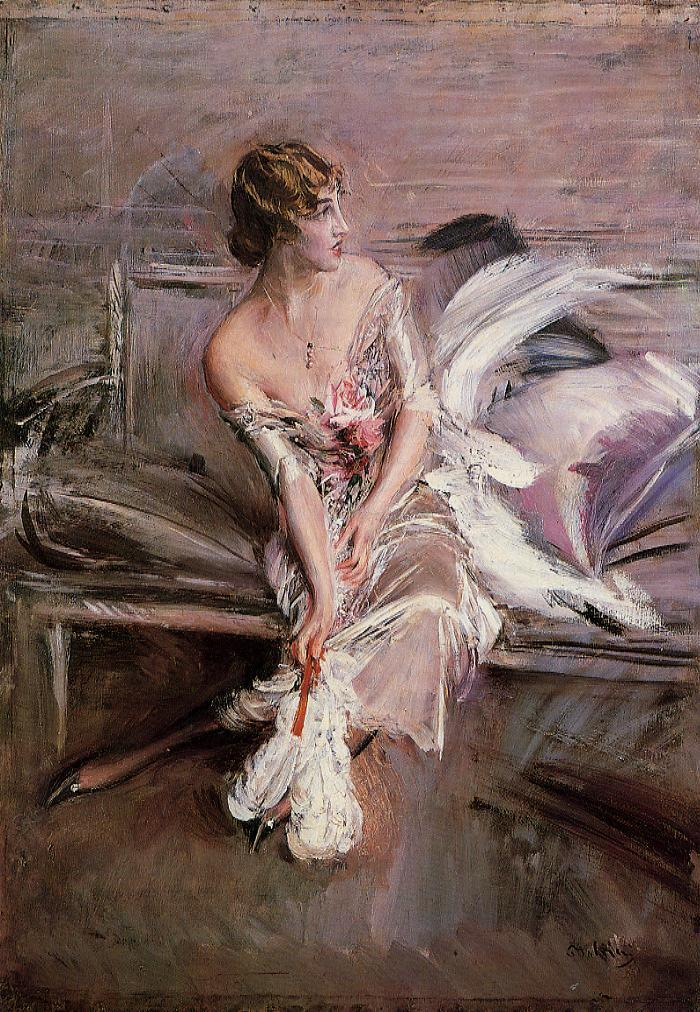
Gladys Deacon in 1901, by Giovanni Boldini

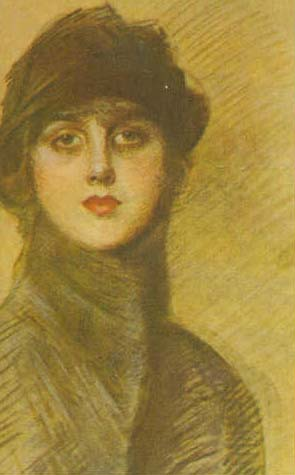
Deacon portrayed by John Singer Sargent

Gladys Marie Spencer-Churchill, Duchess of Marlborough (née Deacon; 7 February 1881 – 13 October 1977) was a French American aristocrat and socialite. She was the mistress and later the second wife of Charles Spencer-Churchill, 9th Duke of Marlborough.

== Early life ==
Born in Paris, Gladys Marie Deacon was the daughter of American citizens Edward Parker Deacon and his wife Florence, daughter of Admiral Charles H. Baldwin. She had three sisters, and a brother who died in infancy. Her father was imprisoned after shooting and killing his wife's lover in 1892 and Gladys was sent to school at the Couvent de l'Assomption at Auteuil.

After Edward's release from prison, Florence abducted Gladys from the convent. The couple was divorced in 1893 and the custody of the three older children, including Gladys, was given to Edward. He took them to the United States, where Deacon remained for the next three years. Edward Deacon soon became mentally unstable and was hospitalised at McLean Hospital, dying there in 1901. Deacon and her sisters returned to France to live with their mother. Marcel Proust wrote of her: "I never saw a girl with such beauty, such magnificent intelligence, such goodness and charm."

== Relationship with Marlborough ==
In the late 1890s, the Duke of Marlborough invited Deacon to Blenheim Palace and she became friends with his wife Consuelo. In 1901, the Crown Prince of Prussia visited the palace and took a strong liking to her, giving her a ring that the Kaiser demanded be returned. At the age of 22, Deacon underwent a plastic surgery attempt in which she had her nose injected with paraffin wax; it slipped to her chin, causing big lumps. Deacon became the Duke's mistress soon after moving into the palace. However, Marlborough and Consuelo did not divorce until 1921. Deacon and Marlborough were married in Paris later that year.

Artistic and a keen gardener, the new Duchess of Marlborough had enlarged images of her startling blue-green eyes painted on the ceiling of the main portico of Blenheim Palace, where they remain today. Later in their unhappy, childless marriage, she kept a revolver in her bedroom to prevent her husband's entry. As her behaviour became increasingly erratic, most noticeably following the Duke's conversion to Roman Catholicism, the couple began drifting apart. The Duchess pursued her hobby of breeding Blenheim Spaniels, much to her husband's displeasure. Finally, the duke moved out of the palace, and two years later evicted her. He died in 1934.

=== Widowhood and death ===
The Dowager Duchess of Marlborough moved with her dogs first to north Oxfordshire and later to the Grange Farm at Chacombe. She started retreating from the world and eventually became a complete nocturnal recluse surrounded by cats. By 1962, she had become mentally ill, much like her father and paternal grandmother, and was forcibly moved to St Andrew's Hospital in Northampton, where she died in 1977, aged 96.

== In popular culture ==
- Michelle Gable's 2016 novel I'll See You in Paris is based in part on the story of the Duchess.
- Death at Blenheim, the eleventh book in Robin Paige's Kathryn Ardleigh Series, also includes Gladys as one of the cast of characters. During the course of this book her childhood as well as her affair with the Duke of Marlborough are discussed.

== Biography ==
- Vickers, Hugo (1980) [1979]. Gladys, Duchess of Marlborough. New York: Holt, Rinehart and Winston. ISBN 9780241123157. OCLC 654541838. (revised edition, entitled The Sphinx: The Life of Gladys Deacon--Duchess of Marlborough, published by Hodder & Stoughton in 2020; ISBN 9781529390704)

== See also ==
- Standing Female Faun
