= Etti Plesch =

Austrian socialite (1914–2003)

- Born: Maria Anna Paula Ferdinandine von Wurmbrand-Stuppach; 3 February 1914; Vienna, Austria-Hungary
- Died: 29 April 2003 (aged 89); Monte Carlo, Monaco
- Occupations: Socialite, racehorse owner, huntress
- Known for: Only female owner to win The Derby twice
- Spouses: Clendenin J. Ryan (m. 1934; div. 1935) Count Paul Pálffy ab Erdöd (m. 1935; div. 1937) Count Tamás Esterházy (m. 1938; div. 1944) Count Sigismund Berchtold (m. 1944; div. 1949) William Deering Davis (m. 1949–1951) Árpád Plesch (m. 1954; died 1974)
- Parent(s): Count Ferdinand von Wurmbrand-Stuppach; May Baltazzi

Etti Plesch, born Countess Maria Anna Paula Ferdinandine von Wurmbrand-Stuppach (3 February 1914 – 29 April 2003), was an Austro-Hungarian countess, huntress, racehorse owner, and socialite. Plesch lost two of her six husbands to the same woman, Louise de Vilmorin, a French literary figure, and owned two winners of The Derby, Psidium in 1961 and Henbit in 1980.

== Early life ==
Born as Countess Maria Anna Paula Ferdinandine von Wurmbrand-Stuppach in Vienna, Austria, of Greco-Austrian heritage. "Etti", as she was known, was putatively the elder daughter of Count Ferdinand von Wurmbrand-Stuppach (1879–1933) and his wife, May Baltazzi (1885–1981), a cousin of Baroness Mary Vetsera, mistress of Crown Prince Rudolf of Austria.

It is presumed that countess's biological father was Count Josef Gizycki (1867–1926), the son of Count Michał Tadeusz Giżycki (d. 1898) and his wife, Countess Ludmilla Zamoyska (1829–1889).

Etti's mother said that Count Gizycki's main interest in life was "the pleasuring of women in a physical way... He was amoral and cynical, but he was a marvelous lover." Gizycki was famed in the early 1900s because of his stormy marriage to American newspaper heiress Cissy Patterson.

Etti von Wurmbrand-Stuppach spent her childhood in her family's castle of Napajedla and was raised in Vienna and in Moravia, with travels to other sites throughout Europe. From the age of 10 until she was 17, she was treated for tuberculosis at the Waltzaner Sanatorium in Davos, the setting for Thomas Mann's novel The Magic Mountain.

== Thoroughbred racing ==
With her last husband, Dr. Plesch, who shared Etti's passion for Thoroughbred horse racing, for which she had been influenced by her maternal grandfather Alexander Baltazzi, who won the 1876 edition of the Epsom Derby with Kisber. Her husband and she began racing Thoroughbreds in 1954, and won major races such as the 1959 Coronation Cup with Nagami and that year's Irish Oaks with Discorea. Their 1961 Epsom Derby winner Psidium was bred by Etti Plesch and raced by the couple. Following her husband's death in 1974, she continued to race horses, and in 1970 won France's most prestigious race with Sassafras. In 1980, Etti Plesch became the only female owner to ever win the Epsom Derby twice when her horse Henbit won England's most prestigious race.

Among her other notable horses, Etti Plesch owned and raced Miswaki, a Group One winner in France as well as a stakes race winner in the United States, hat became an important sire of 97 stakes race winners and was the Leading broodmare sire in Great Britain and Ireland in 1999 and 2001.

== Personal life ==
At the age of 17, she fell in love with Count Wladimir Wladschi Mittrovsky von Mitrowitz (1901–1976), but was forbidden to marry him because he had a blood disease. She journeyed to New York and met up with her mother's distant relative, Prince Chlodwig Hohenlohe-Waldenburg-Schillingsfürst, Prince of Ratibor and Corvey (1897–1968). While there, she met American railway heir Clendenin J. Ryan Jr. (1905–1957), grandson of Thomas Fortune Ryan, who proposed to her on their third date. Etti married him on 20 February 1935 in Saint Patrick's Cathedral in New York. Mayor Fiorello La Guardia was best man. The marriage only lasted three months; they divorced in 1935 and she returned to Europe with "a settlement of only $35,000." The marriage was later annulled in 1944.

=== Second marriage ===
After she returned to Europe, she met another distant relative, Hungarian Count Paul Pálffy ab Erdöd (1890–1968) and became the fourth of his eight eventual wives in late 1935. They lived in Slovakia. Their life was taken up with tiger hunts in India; they both became good shots, killing stags, elephants, and antelopes. They attended the World Exposition of Shooting at Berlin, hosted by Hermann Göring. Shortly afterwards, Pálffy became smitten with siren-like writer Louise de Vilmorin in Paris, divorced Etti in December 1937, and married Louise.

=== Third marriage ===
On the rebound, Etti married Count Tamás Esterházy de Galántha (1901–1964), descendant of the junior comital branch of a great princely family, on 5 March 1938, and went to live in his Devecser castle, in Hungary. The two were also related, both descending from Franz Joseph I, Prince of Liechtenstein. Together, they hunted, traveled, and had one daughter:

- Marie-Anna Berta Felicie Johanna Ghislaine Theodora Huberta Georgina Helene Genoveva "Bunny" Esterházy de Galántha (1938–2021), who married the Hon. Dominic Elliot (b. 1931), a younger son of the 5th Earl of Minto, in 1962; they divorced 1972.

In 1942, she journeyed abroad alone, and her husband became involved with Vilmorin, the same woman who had married her second husband Count Pálffy of Erdöd. Count Esterházy divorced Etti in 1944 and ran away with Vilmorin, although the two never married.

=== Fourth marriage ===
Etti's next husband was another distant relative, Austrian Count Sigismund Berchtold zu Ungarschütz (1900–1979), son of Count Leopold Berchtold, the Minister of Foreign Affairs, who advised the Emperor to declare war on the Serbs, starting World War I, and his wife, Countess Nandine Károlyi de Nagy-Károly (1868–1955). They wed in 1944 and divorced in 1949.

=== Fifth marriage ===
The fifth was Chicago millionaire William Deering Davis, who had been briefly married to silent film star Louise Brooks, in the 1930s; Plesch's marriage, at age 34, to Davis, aged 52, lasted from 1949 until their divorce in 1951.

=== Sixth marriage ===
In 1954, Etti married her last husband, Dr Árpád Plesch (1889–1974), a wealthy Hungarian lawyer, international financier, and collector of rare botanical books and pornographic esoterica. She met Plesch through her friends Gloria Guinness and Thomas "Loel" Guinness in Paris. The Plesches lived on the Avenue Foch in Paris, and at the Villa Leonina at Beaulieu-sur-Mer in the south of France, where he had a famous botanical garden.

After her husband's death in 1974, she took up partying, and writing her memoirs, which were almost completed at the time of her death. They were edited by Hugo Vickers and published posthumously in 2007 as Horses and Husbands. She died 29 April 2003 in Monte Carlo.

=== Descendants ===
Through her daughter Bunny, she was a grandmother to two boys, Alexander Elliot-Murray-Kynynmound (1963–1985), who died unmarried, and Esmond Elliot-Murray-Kynynmound (b. 1965).
