= The Gates of Hell =

Sculpture by Auguste Rodin

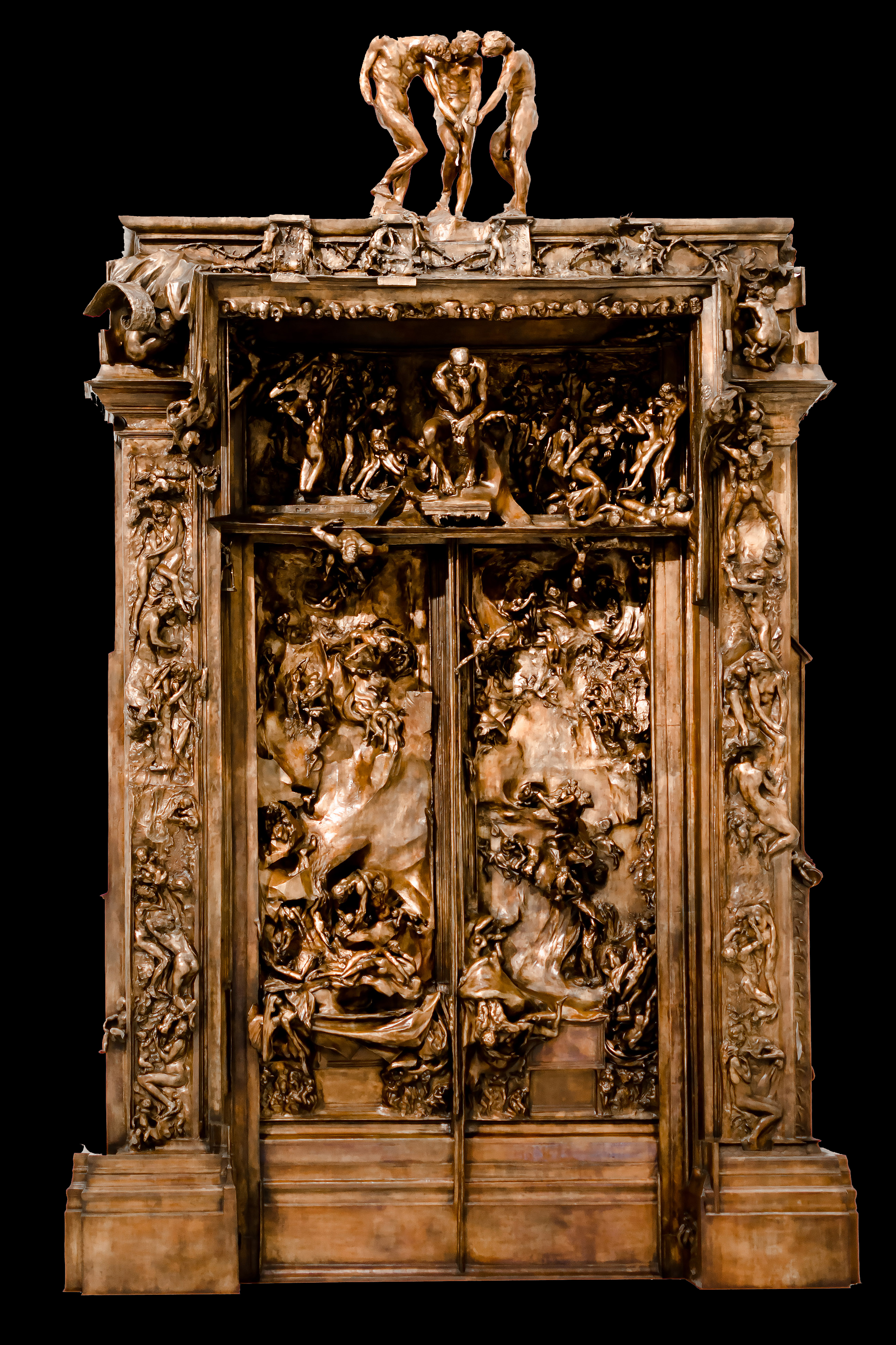
- At the Museo Soumaya
- Artist: Auguste Rodin
- Medium: Bronze
- Location: Musée D'Orsay, Paris (plaster model); casts in various places

The Gates of Hell (French: La Porte de l'Enfer) is a monumental bronze sculptural group work by the French artist Auguste Rodin that depicts a scene from the Inferno, the first section of Dante Alighieri's Divine Comedy. It stands at 6 metres high, 4 metres wide and 1 metre deep (19.7×13.1×3.3 ft) and contains 180 figures.

Several casts of the work were made, which are now in various locations around the world. Rodin's original plaster model is in the Musée D'Orsay, Paris. The figures range from 15 centimetres (6 in) high up to more than one metre (3 ft). Several of the figures were also cast as independent free-standing statues.

== History ==
The sculpture was commissioned by the Directorate of Fine Arts in 1880. Rodin worked on and off on this project for thirty-seven years, continuously adding, removing, or altering over two hundred human figures on the doors, until his death in 1917.

The Directorate asked for an inviting entrance to a planned Decorative Arts Museum with the theme being left to Rodin's selection. Even before this commission, Rodin had developed sketches of some of Dante's characters based on his admiration of Dante's Inferno.

The Decorative Arts Museum was never built. Rodin worked on this project on the ground floor of the Hôtel Biron. Near the end of his life, Rodin donated sculptures, drawings and reproduction rights to the French government. In 1919, two years after his death, the Hôtel Biron became the Musée Rodin, housing a cast of The Gates of Hell and related works.

== Inspiration ==
Through me the way into the suffering city,
Through me the way to the eternal pain,
Through me the way that runs among the lost.
Justice urged on my high artificer;
My Maker was Divine authority,
The highest Wisdom, and the primal Love.
Before me nothing but eternal things
Were made, and I endure eternally.
Abandon all hope, ye who enter here.

— Dante, Inferno, 3.1–9

Rodin conceived that people would walk toward the work, perhaps up a flight of stairs, and be overwhelmed frontally by the massive gates, contemplating the experience of hell that Dante describes in his Inferno. Rodin thought particularly of Dante's warning over the entrance of the Inferno, "Abandon all hope, ye who enter here."

A work of the scope of The Gates of Hell had not been attempted before, but inspiration came from Lorenzo Ghiberti's Gates of Paradise at the Baptistery of St. John, Florence, 15th century bronze doors depicting figures from the Old Testament. Another source of inspiration was medieval cathedrals combining high and low relief. Rodin was also inspired by Michelangelo's fresco The Last Judgment, Delacroix's painting The Barque of Dante, Balzac's collection La Comédie humaine and Baudelaire's poems Les Fleurs du mal.

In an article in Le Matin, Rodin said: "For a whole year I lived with Dante, with him alone, drawing the eight circles of his inferno. [...] At the end of this year, I realized that while my drawing rendered my vision of Dante, they had become too remote from reality. So I started all over again, working from nature, with my models."

== Gallery ==
Variations of The Gates of Hell

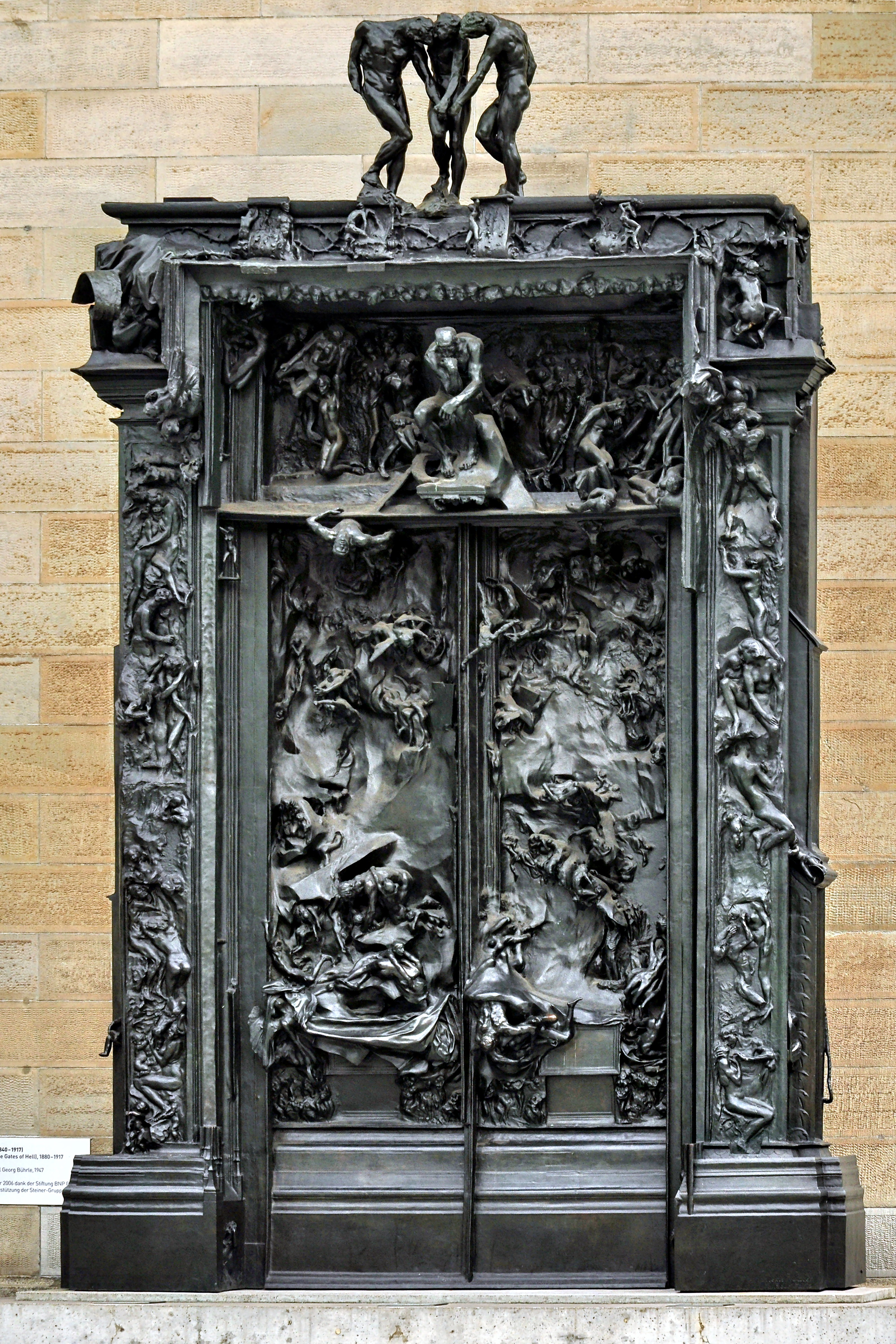
The Kunsthaus Zürich in Zürich

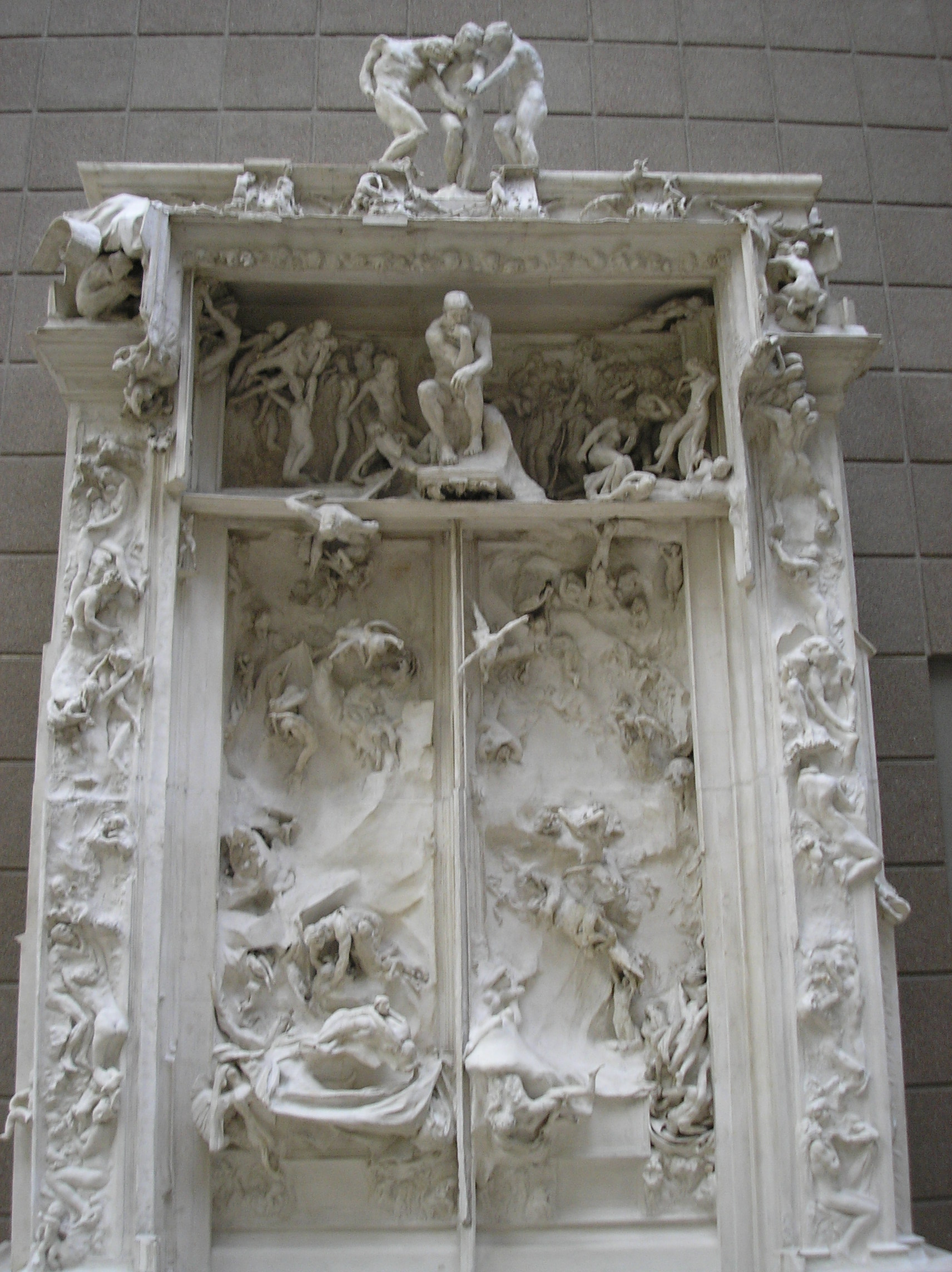
Musée d'Orsay in Paris

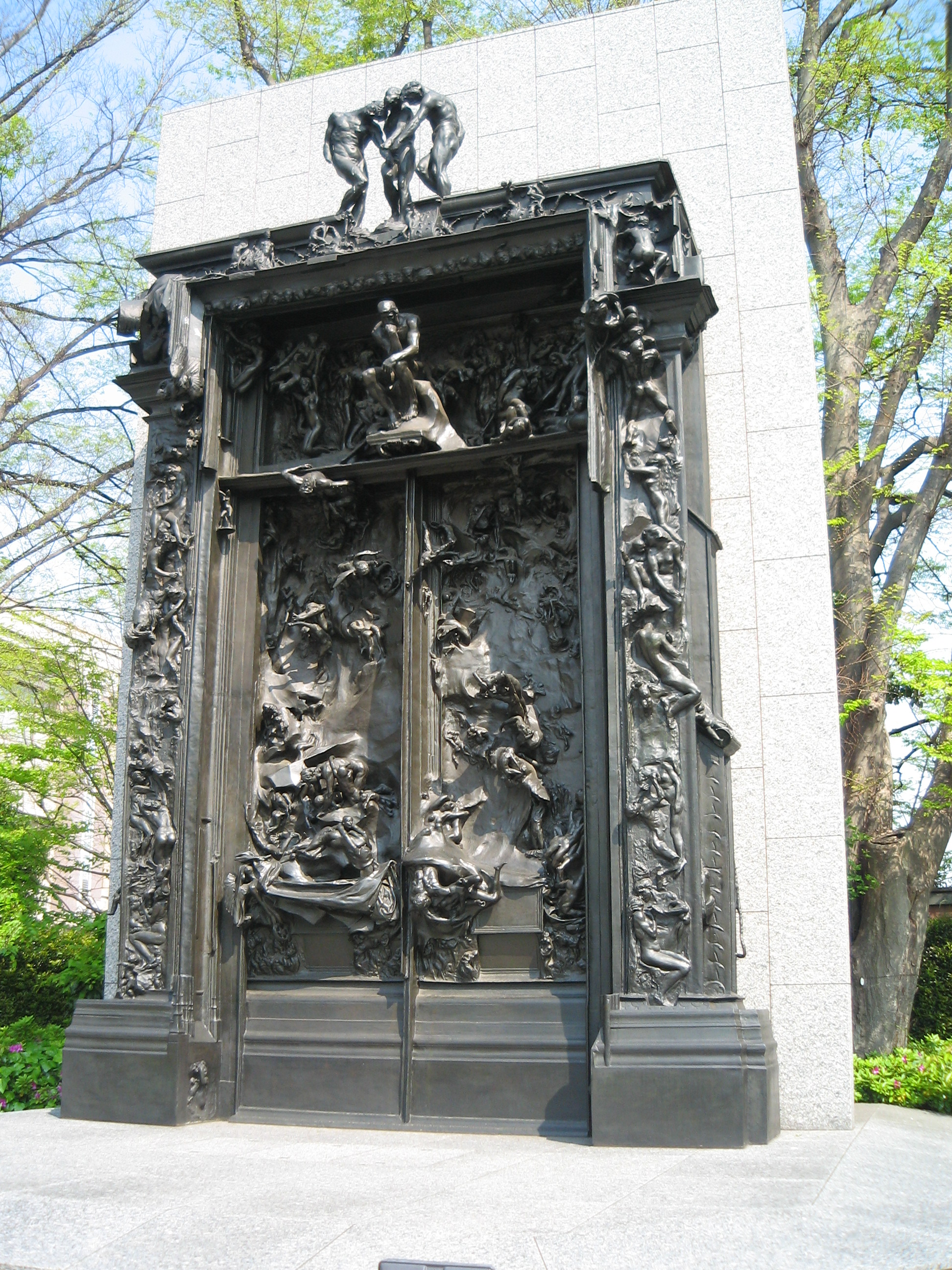
The National Museum of Western Art in Ueno Park, Tokyo

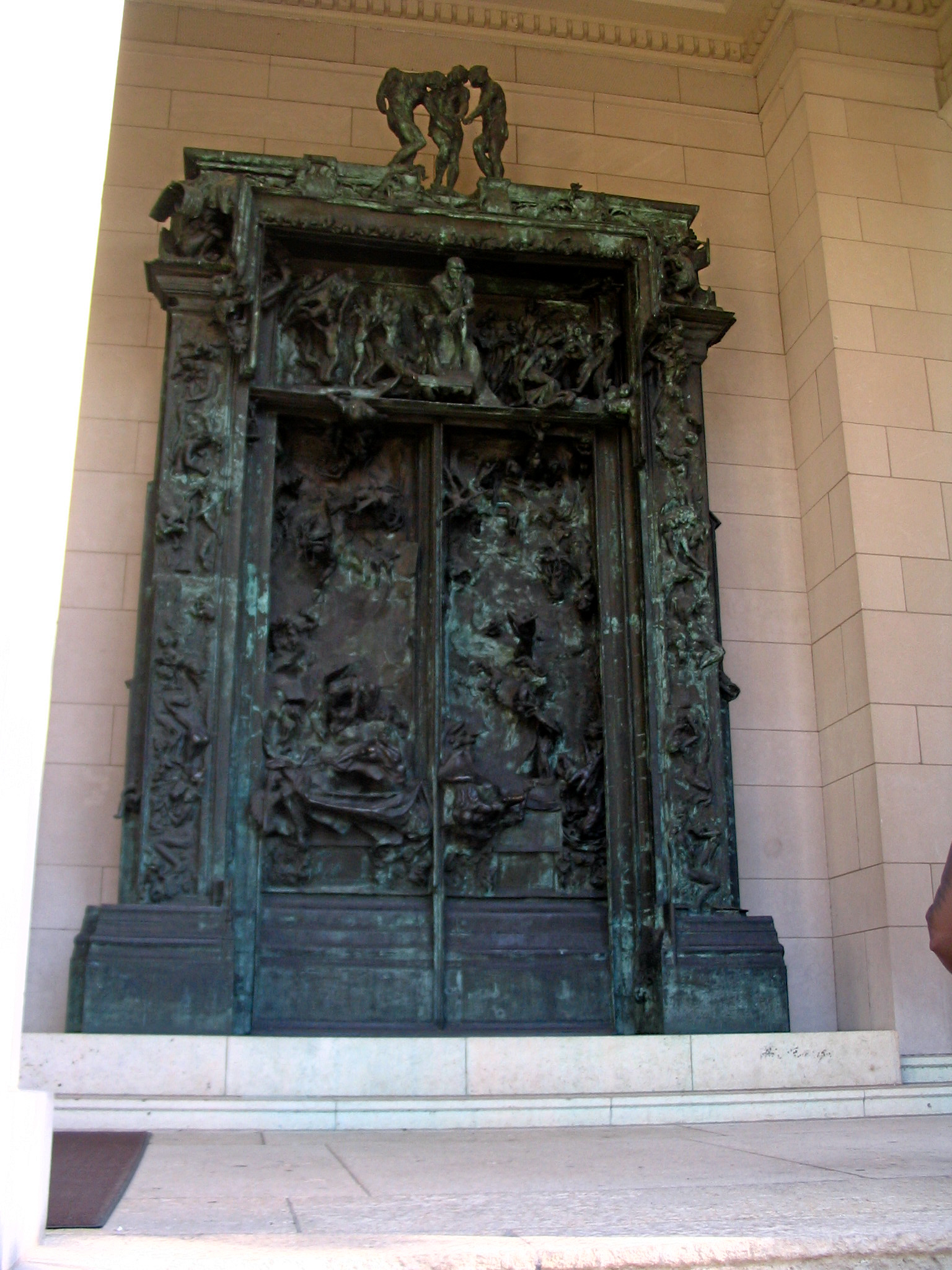
The Rodin Museum in Philadelphia

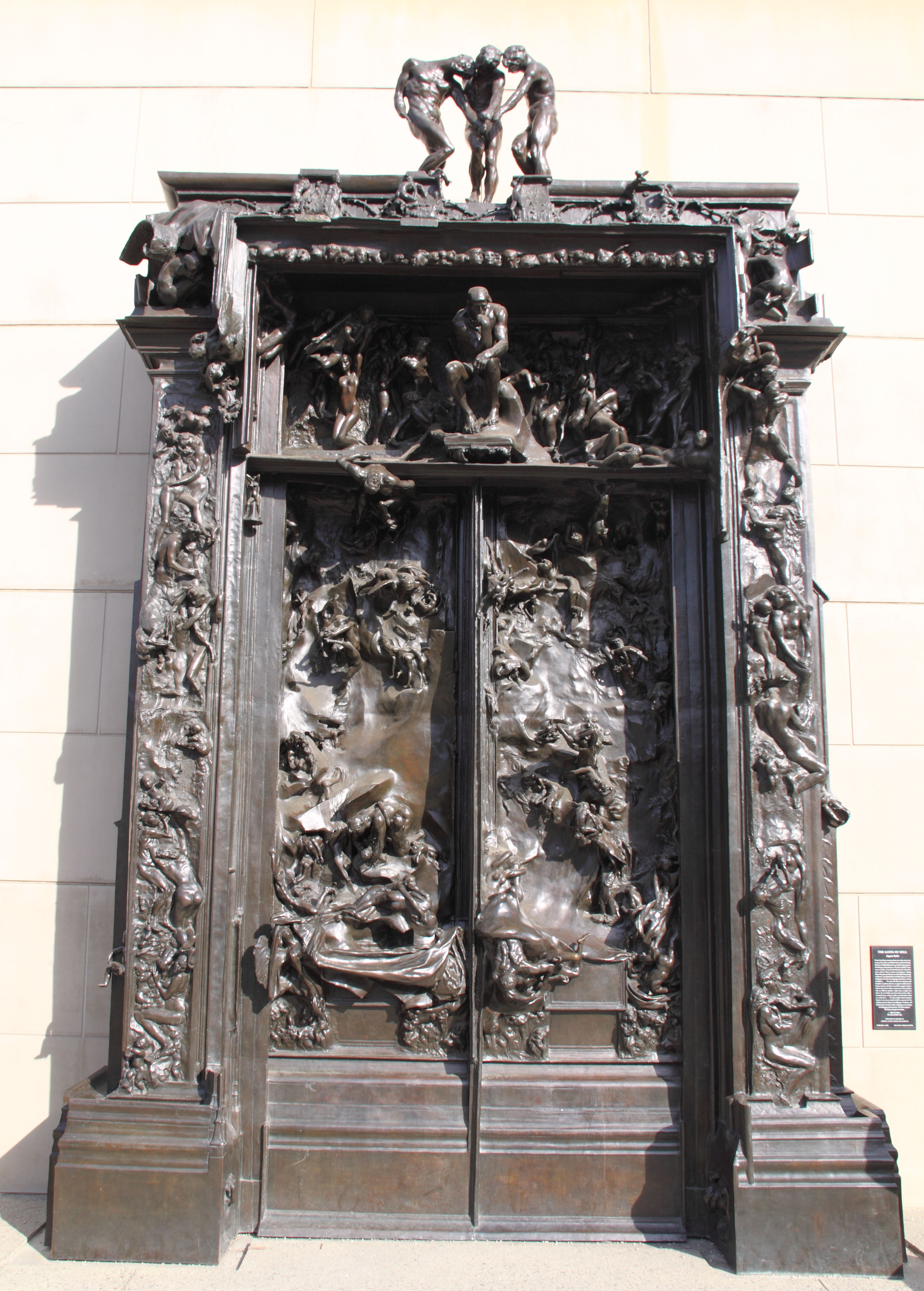
The Iris & B. Gerald Cantor Center for Visual Arts at Stanford University

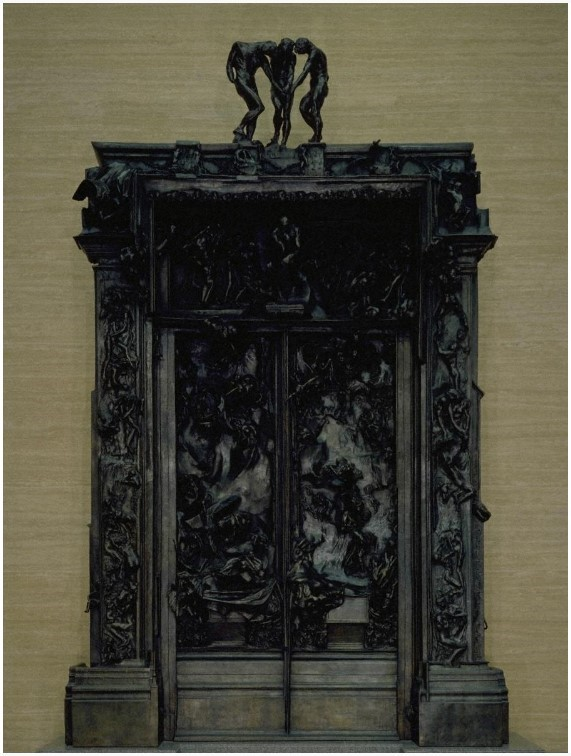
Shizuoka Prefectural Museum of Art, Japan

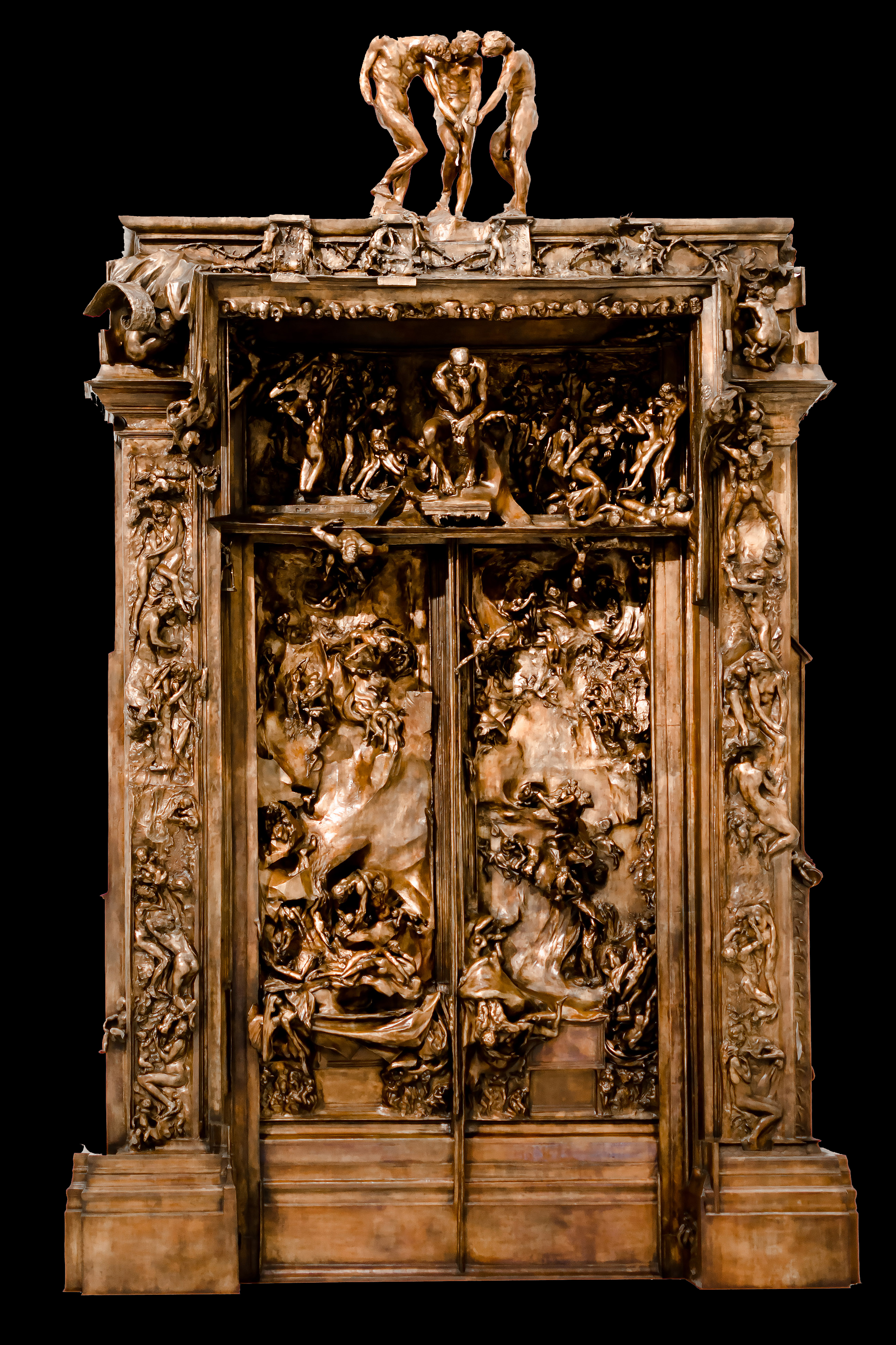
Museo Soumaya, Mexico City

== Outstanding figures ==
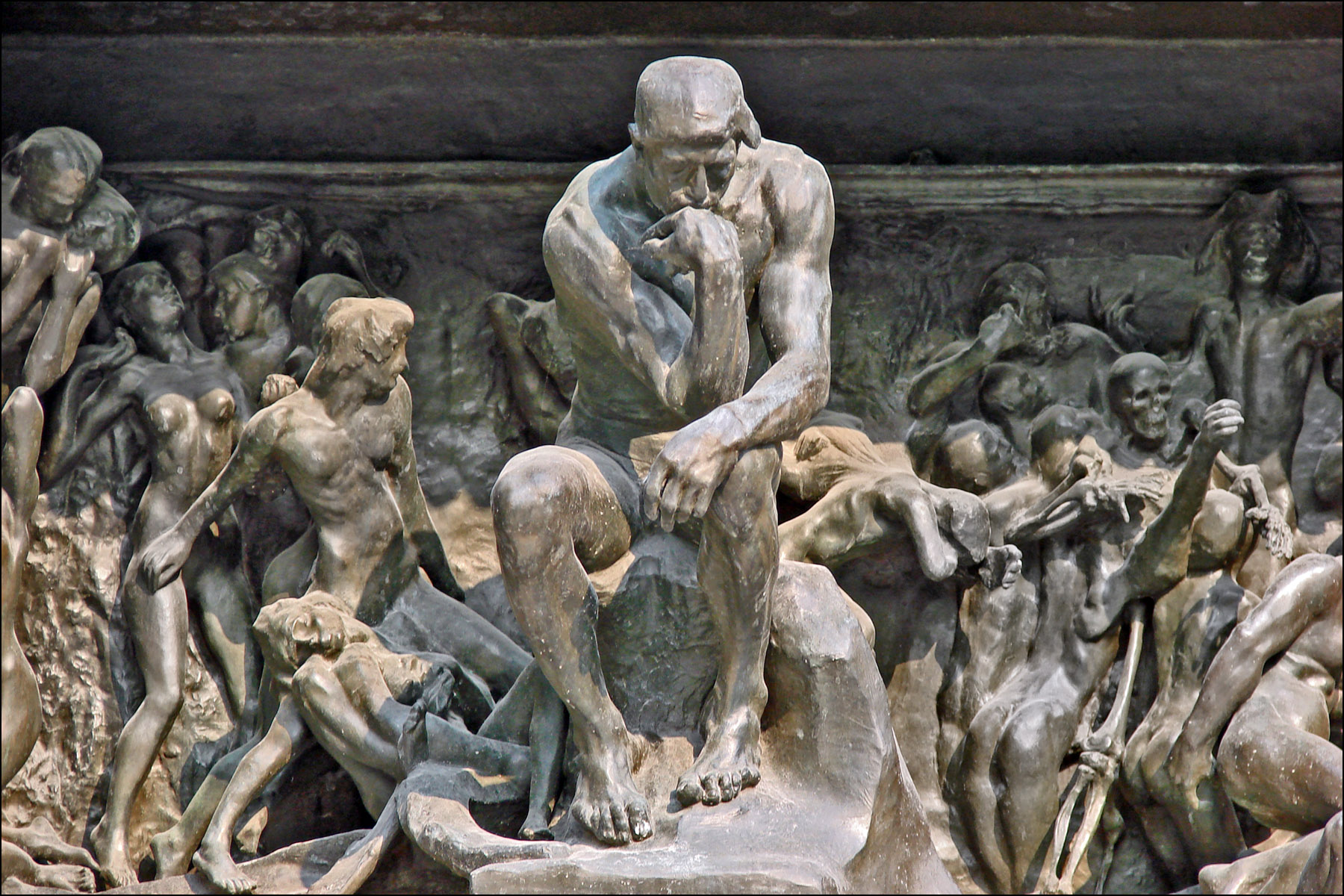
The Thinker in the Gates at the Musée Rodin

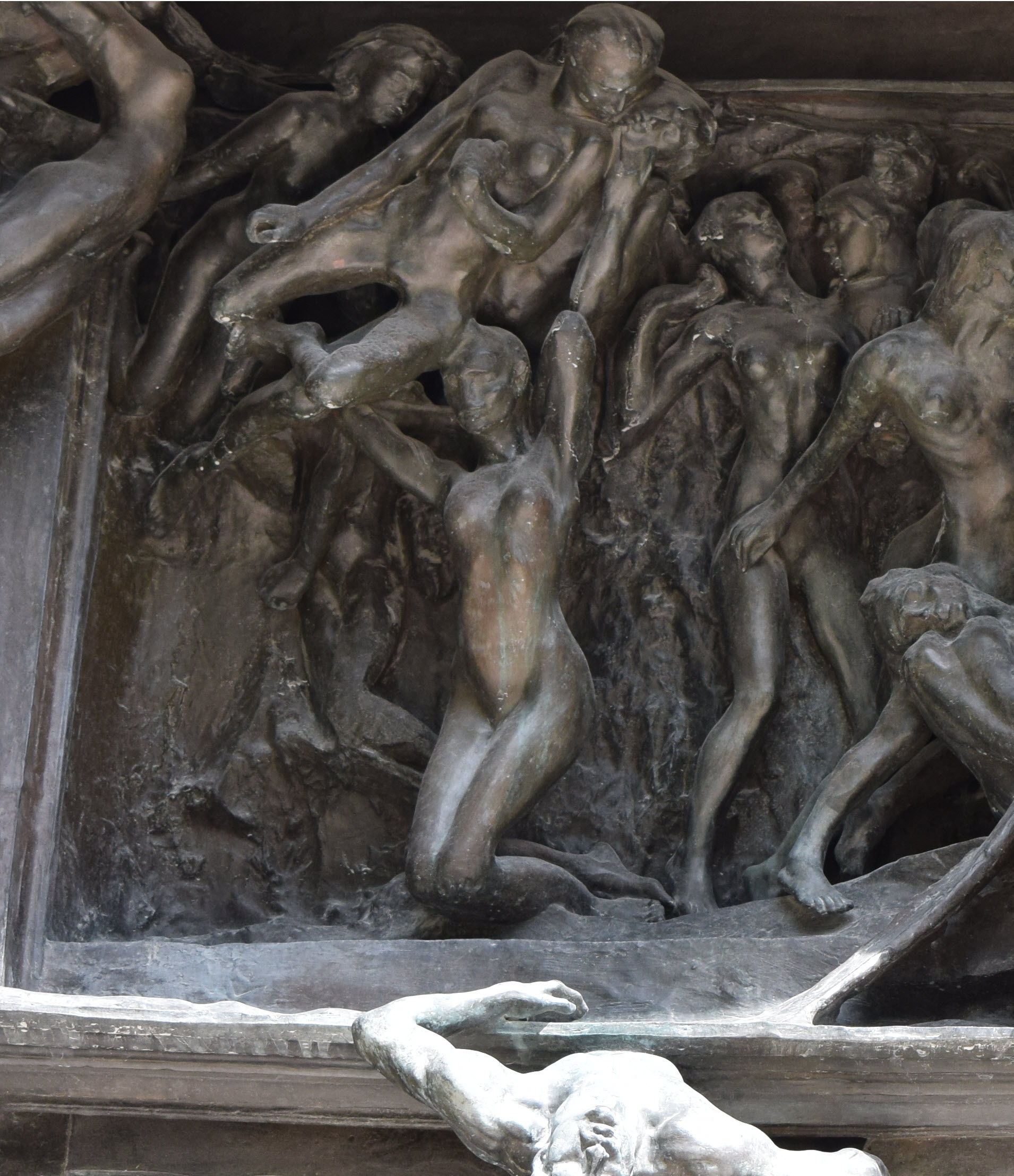
Detail of the Kneeling Female Faun in the tympanum

The original sculptures were enlarged and became works of art of their own.

- The Thinker (Le Penseur), also called The Poet, is located above the door panels. One interpretation suggests that it might represent Dante looking down to the characters in the Inferno. Another interpretation is that the Thinker is Rodin himself meditating about his composition. Others believe that the figure may be Adam, contemplating the destruction brought upon mankind because of his sin.
- The Kiss (Le Baiser) was originally in The Gate along with other figures of Paolo and Francesca da Rimini. Rodin wanted to represent their initial joy as well as their final damnation. He removed the figure that became known as The Kiss because it seemed to conflict with the other suffering figures.
- Ugolino and His Children (Ugolin et ses enfants) depicts Ugolino della Gherardesca, who according to the story, ate the corpses of his children after they died by starvation (Dante, Inferno, Canto XXXIII). The Ugolino group was cast as a separate bronze in 1882.
- The Three Shades (Les Trois Ombres) was originally 98 cm high. The over-life size group was initially made of three independent figures in 1899. Later on, Rodin replaced one hand in the figures to fuse them together, in the same form as the smaller version. The figures originally pointed to the phrase "Lasciate ogne speranza, voi ch'intrate" ("Abandon all hope, ye who enter here") from Canto III of the Inferno.
- Fleeting Love (Fugit Amor) is located on the right door pane, it is one of several figures of lovers that represent Paolo and Francesca da Rimini. The male figure is also called The Prodigal.
- Paolo and Francesca is shown on the left door pane. Paolo tries to reach Francesca, who seems to slip away.
- Meditation appears on the rightmost part of the tympanum, shown as an enlarged figure in 1896.
- The Old Courtesan is a bronze cast from 1910 of an aged, naked female body. The sculpture is also called She Who Was Once the Helmet-Maker's Beautiful Wife (Celle qui fut la belle heaulmière). This title is taken from a poem by François Villon.
- Fallen Caryatid Carrying Her Stone is based on the figure at the top of the left pilaster. Around 1881 Rodin enlarged her and gave her a stone.
- I Am Beautiful (Je suis belle), cast in 1882, is among the second set of figures on the extreme right portion of the door.
- Eternal Springtime (L'Éternel printemps) was cast in 1884. It exists in several separate versions, both in marble and in bronze.
- Despair is found in various versions on both the left and right door panes.
- Kneeling Female Faun was conceived around 1884 and first cast in 1887. It is found on the left side of the tympanum, in front of the bas-reliefs which form the background.
- Adam and Eve. Rodin asked the directorate for additional funds for the independent sculptures of Adam and Eve that were meant to frame The Gates of Hell. However, Rodin found he could not get Eve's figure right. Consequently, several figures of Eve were made, none of which were used, and all of them were later sold.

== Locations ==
External videos
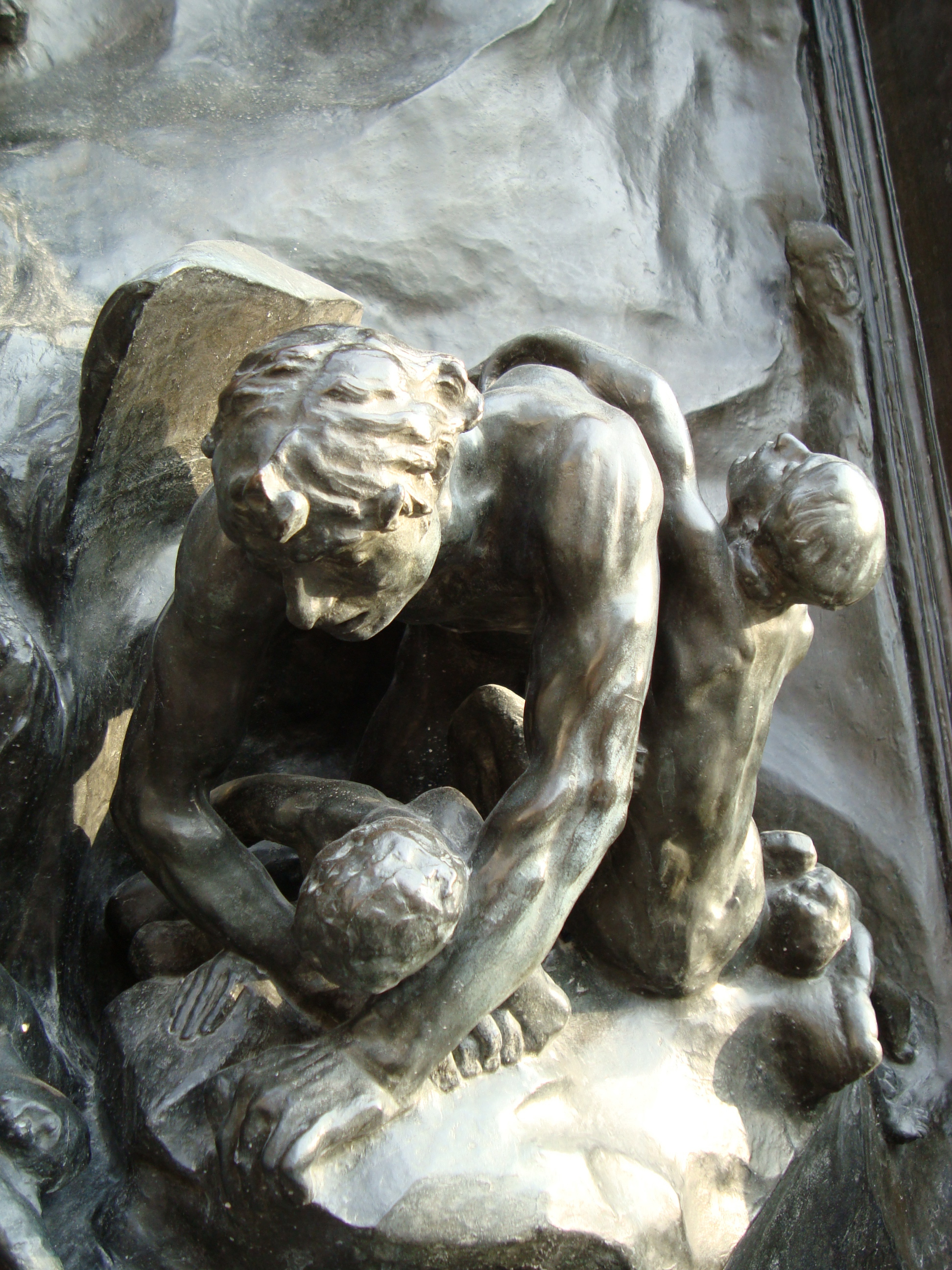
- Rodin's The Gates of Hell, Smarthistory
- The Gates of Hell, The story of a damned artwork , Canal Educatif

The original plaster was restored in 1917 and is displayed at the Musée d'Orsay in Paris. A series of plaster casts illustrating the development of the work is on view at the Musée Rodin in Meudon. Also in 1917, a model was used to make the original three bronze casts:

- The Musée Rodin, Paris.
- The Rodin Museum, Philadelphia, United States.
- The National Museum of Western Art in Ueno Park, Tokyo.

Subsequent bronzes have been distributed by the Musée Rodin to a number of locations, including:

- The Kunsthaus Zürich, Zürich
- The Iris & B. Gerald Cantor Center for Visual Arts at Stanford University
- The Plateau, Seoul, South Korea(closed since 2016, now the bronze is at the storage of the Ho-Am Art Museum)
- Museo Soumaya, Mexico City, Mexico
- Shizuoka Prefectural Museum of Art, Shizuoka, Japan, which has a special Rodin Wing.
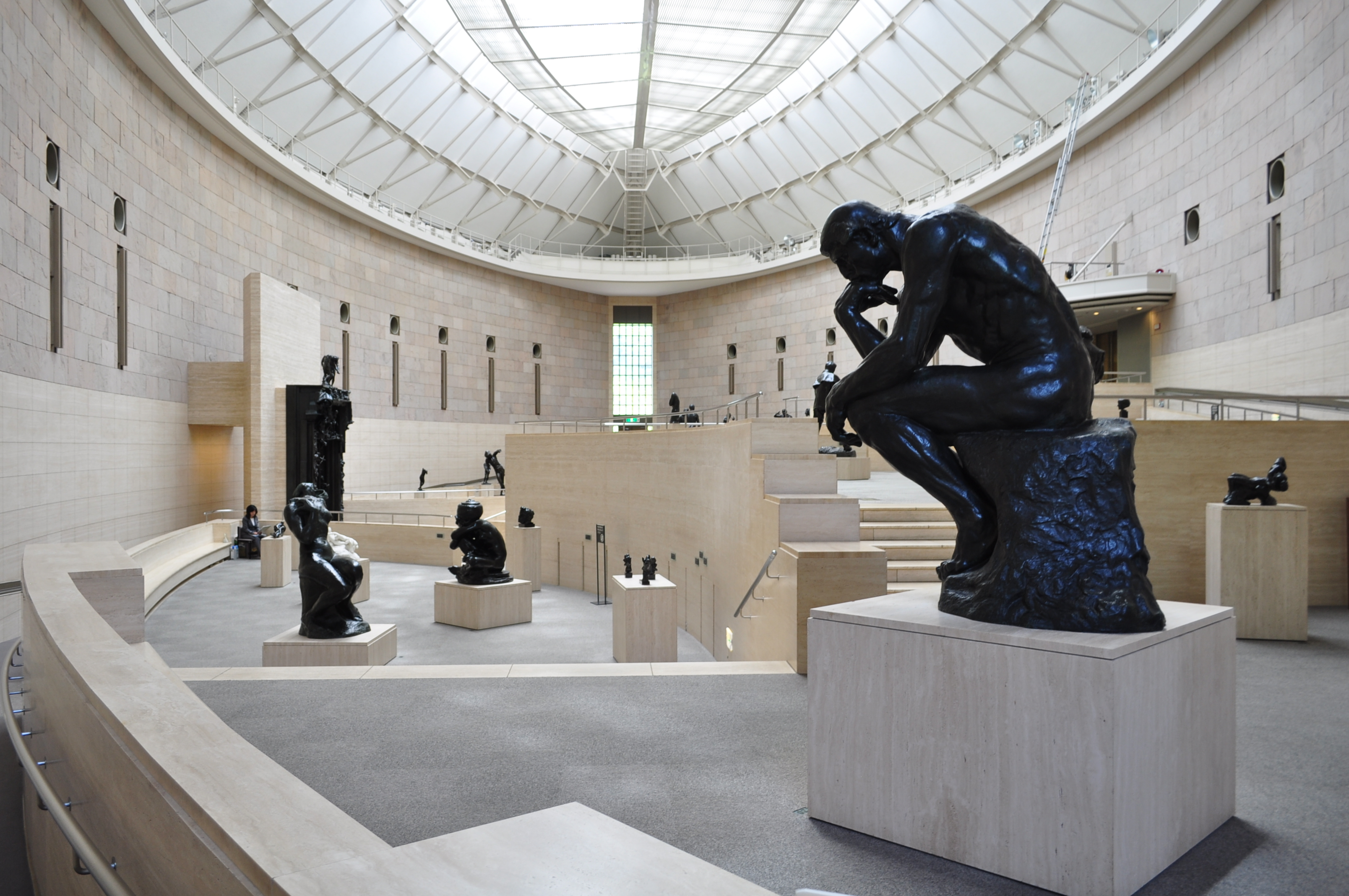
  The Rodin Wing of the Shizuoka Prefectural Museum of Art

== See also ==
- List of sculptures by Auguste Rodin
- Dante and his Divine Comedy in popular culture
- Virtual Reality in 3D : Hell's Gate by Auguste Rodin | Shizuoka Prefectural Museum of Art
