= Pardal =

Pardal is the surname of:

- Chris Pardal (born 1972), American actor
- Edmilson Marques Pardal (born 1980), Brazilian footballer
- Fernando Rielo Pardal (1923–2004), Spanish mystical poet, philosopher, author, metaphysician and founder of a Catholic religious institute
- Manuel Ribeiro Pardal (died 1671), Portuguese privateer in Spanish service
- Walter Gómez Pardal (1927–2004), Uruguayan footballer

Pardal is the nickname of:

- Ingrid Carolina Frisanco (born 1993), Brazilian footballer
- Lino Mancilla (1916–2020), Brazilian footballer

== See also ==
- Pardal Mallet (1864–1894), Brazilian journalist and novelist
- El Pardal, a village in Spain
