= Solid Happiness =

1997 painting by Roberto Matta

Solid Happiness is an oil on canvas painted in Italy by the Chilean artist Roberto Matta in 1997. Germana Ferrari Matta, the painter's last companion and the cataloguer of his oeuvre, certified the work on 28 April 2001.

== Origin and history of the painting ==
The painting went from the Diana Lowenstein gallery in Buenos Aires to the Galería Almirante in Madrid and from there to Sotheby's auction house in New York, before being acquired by Fundación Carlos Slim for the Latin American Vanguard and Art collection of Museo Soumaya.

Barbara Eschenburg has written: "...Matta feels obliged to transmit messages in his work that come from the subconscious through the psyche, combining perceptions, reflections, and knowledge. Through them he formulates large questions..."

The painting was included in the exhibition El año de los 000 organized by the Fundación Telefónica in Santiago de Chile from April 7 to July 2, 2000.
