= Museo Soumaya =

Soumaya Museum
- Museo Soumaya
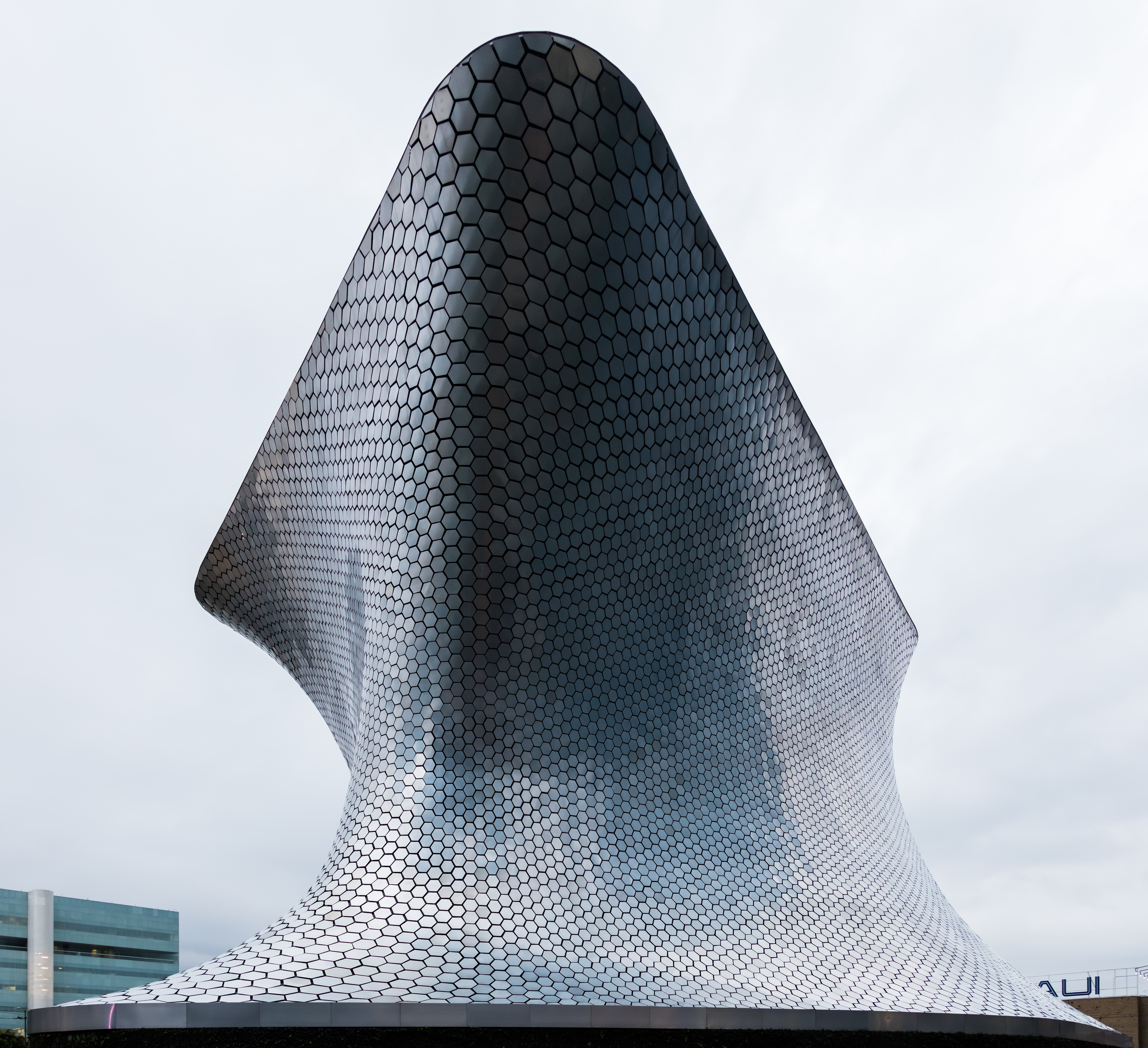
- Exterior of the Plaza Carso building, 2014
- Interactive fullscreen map
- Location: Nuevo Polanco, Mexico City
- Coordinates: 19.4407°N 99.2046°W
- Type: Art museum
- Accreditation: ICOM; Mexican ILM; FEMAM
- Collection size: 66,000+
- Visitors: 1.1 million (2013): Ranked 1st nationally; Ranked 56th globally
- Founder: Carlos Slim
- Director: Alfonso Miranda
- Owner: Carlos Slim Foundation
- Public transit access: Polanco and San Joaquín metro stations (both at distance)
- Website: www.museosoumaya.org
- Building details

Design and construction
- Architect: Fernando Romero

The Museo Soumaya is a private museum in Mexico City and a non-profit cultural institution with two museum buildings in Mexico City — Plaza Loreto opened in 1994 and Plaza Carso opened in 2011. It has over 66,000 works from 30 centuries of art including sculptures from Pre-Hispanic Mesoamerica, 19th- and 20th-century Mexican art and an extensive repertoire of works by European old masters and masters of modern western art such as Auguste Rodin, Salvador Dalí, Bartolomé Esteban Murillo and Tintoretto. It is called one of the most complete collections of its kind.

The museum is named after Soumaya Domit, who died in 1999, and was the wife of the founder of the museum Carlos Slim. The museum received an attendance of 1,095,000 in 2013, making it the most visited art museum in Mexico and the 56th in the world that year. In October 2015, the museum welcomed its five millionth visitor. The museum was designed by Slim's son-in-law, Fernando Romero's practice, fr·ee.

== Collection ==
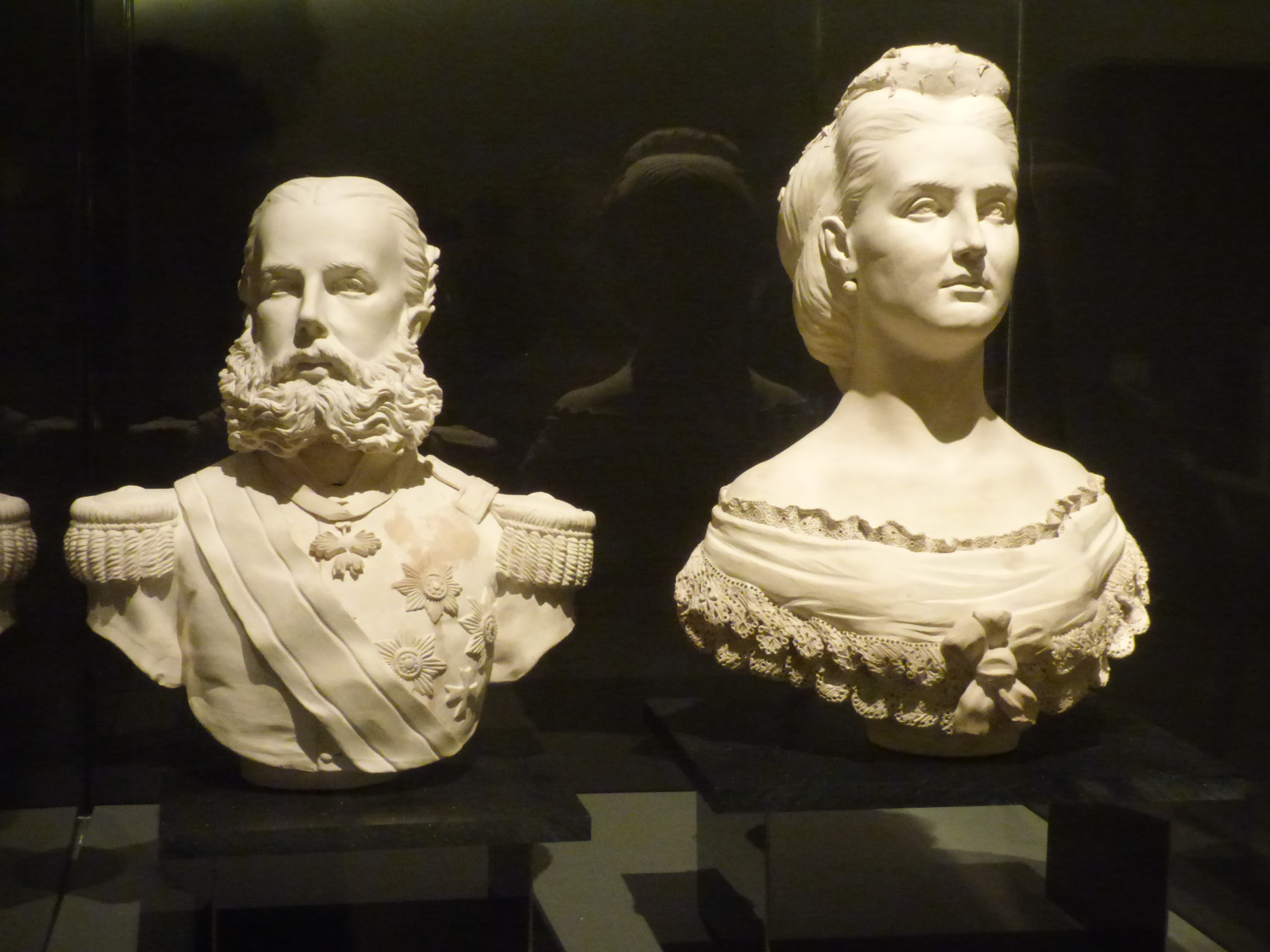
Bust of Maximiliano I of Mexico and Carlota of Mexico.

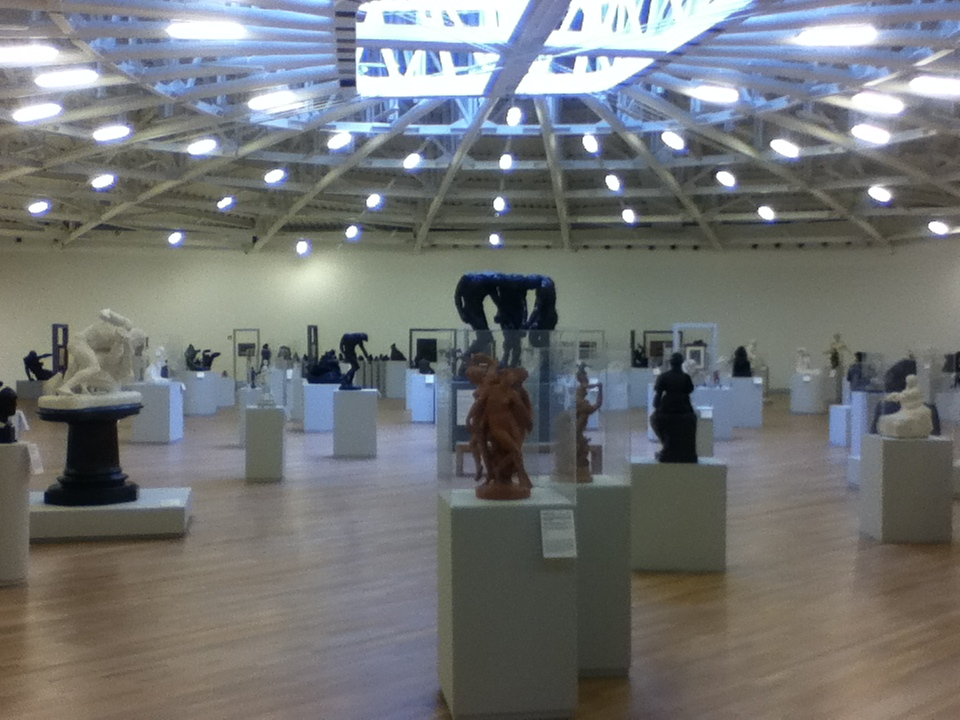
The Julián and Linda Slim gallery, Plaza Carso building, where much of the Rodin and Dalí collection is displayed. The Three Shades can be seen in the middle of the gallery.

The Museo Soumaya has a collection of over 66,000 pieces of art. The majority of the art consists of European works from the 15th to the 20th centuries. It also holds Mexican art, religious relics, and historical documents and coins. The museum contains the world's largest collection of pre-Hispanic and colonial era coins.

The museum holds the largest collection of casts of sculptures by Auguste Rodin outside France, and the world's largest private collection of his art. Slim owns a total of 380 casts and works of art by Rodin. His late wife, whom he credits with teaching him much of what he knows about art, was an admirer of Rodin's work. In addition to Rodin, some notable European artists whose work is displayed include Salvador Dalí, Pablo Picasso, the circle of Leonardo da Vinci, Pierre-Auguste Renoir, Joan Miró, Vincent van Gogh, Henri Matisse, Claude Monet, Bartolomé Esteban Murillo, El Greco, Camille Claudel, and Tintoretto. The most valuable work of art in the collection is believed to be a version of Madonna of the Yarnwinder by a member of the circle of Leonardo da Vinci. Another version of the same painting has been valued at over £30 Million.

Several Mexican artists are also featured, including Diego Rivera and Rufino Tamayo. The director of the museum has claimed that the total worth of the art it holds is over $700 million.

The museum's director, Alfonso Miranda, has described its approach as "not a copy of the Occident; what we have is a whole new version of things." The museum notably includes some types of European art that have not been permanently displayed in Latin America in the past. The museum collection includes many of the most well known European artists from the 15th to 20th centuries, in particular a large collection of sculptures by Rodin and Dalí.

Carlos Slim bought a large number of sculptures by Rodin in the 1980s and the value of many of these pieces has soared since. With a collection of over 100 Rodin works, some critics have claimed that Slim "...is more of a bargain hunter than an aesthete".

== Building ==
The original building of the Museo Soumaya, opened in 1994, is in the Plaza Loreto of San Ángel in the southern part of Mexico City. The new building in Plaza Carso in the Nuevo Polanco district was designed by the Mexican architect Fernando Romero, son-in-law of Lebanese-Mexican billionaire Carlos Slim Helu, and opened in 2011. The building is named after Lebanese-Mexican Soumaya Domit Gemayel who is the late wife of Carlos Slim Helu. Her relatives are also the important political family Gemayel in Lebanon and is a cousin of the former President's Bashir and Amine Gemayel.

=== Plaza Loreto ===
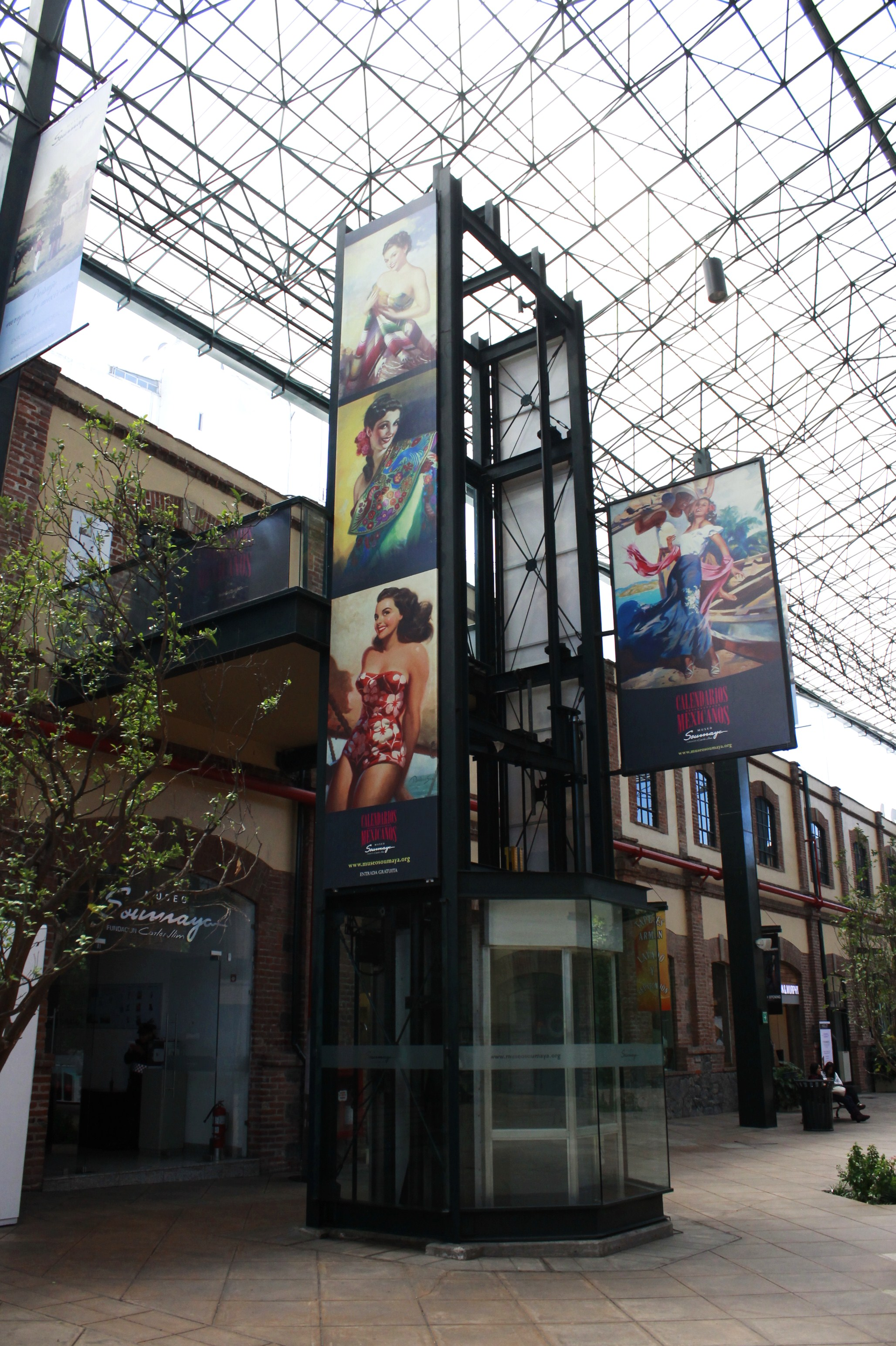
Soumaya Museum Entrance Plaza Loreto.

Built near the Magdalena river the museum's first building is on what was part of the encomienda of the conquistador Hernán Cortés in the 15th century. His son Martín Cortés installed a wheat watermill on the site which in the 19th century was converted to a paper mill. In 1905 a fire broke out in the facility and as a result, on 13 October 1905, its then owners sold to Alberto Lenz. In 1906 Lenz converted the mill to a factory named Fábrica de Papel de Loreto y Peña Pobre after which the current plaza is named.

In the 1980s, another fire destroyed most of the facilities and operations were transferred to the state of Tlaxcala. This led to the Grupo Carso undertaking an urban conversion of the ruins to turn it into what is now the site of the museum - officially founded in 1994. In 1996 the museum received heritage recognition from ICOMOS. The museum building featured four distinct rooms each of which had a specific theme: European & Mexican landscape; The age of Rodin; Mexican calendars; temporary exhibitions. In 2014, on the occasion of its 19th anniversary, it hosted the exhibition European Landscapes, showing 50 works by Pierre-Antoine Demachy, Klaes Molenaer and Joost Carhelisz. 24 of these were new acquisitions.

=== Plaza Carso ===
In 2011 the main collection moved to a new 16,000-square-metre (170,000 sq ft) building, constructed in the north of the city in Plaza Carso.

==== Construction ====
The building is a 46-metre-high (151 ft) six-story building covered by 16,000 hexagonal aluminum tiles. The aluminium used in the project was supplied by a company that is also owned by Carlos Slim. The new building was designed by the Mexican architect Fernando Romero, who is married to a daughter of Carlos Slim, engineered with Ove Arup and Frank Gehry, and cost $70 million to build. The museum has a narrow entrance that opens into a large white gallery. The top floor of the building is opened so that it is illuminated by sunlight during the daytime. In addition to the art galleries, the new building contains a library, restaurant, and a 350-seat auditorium.

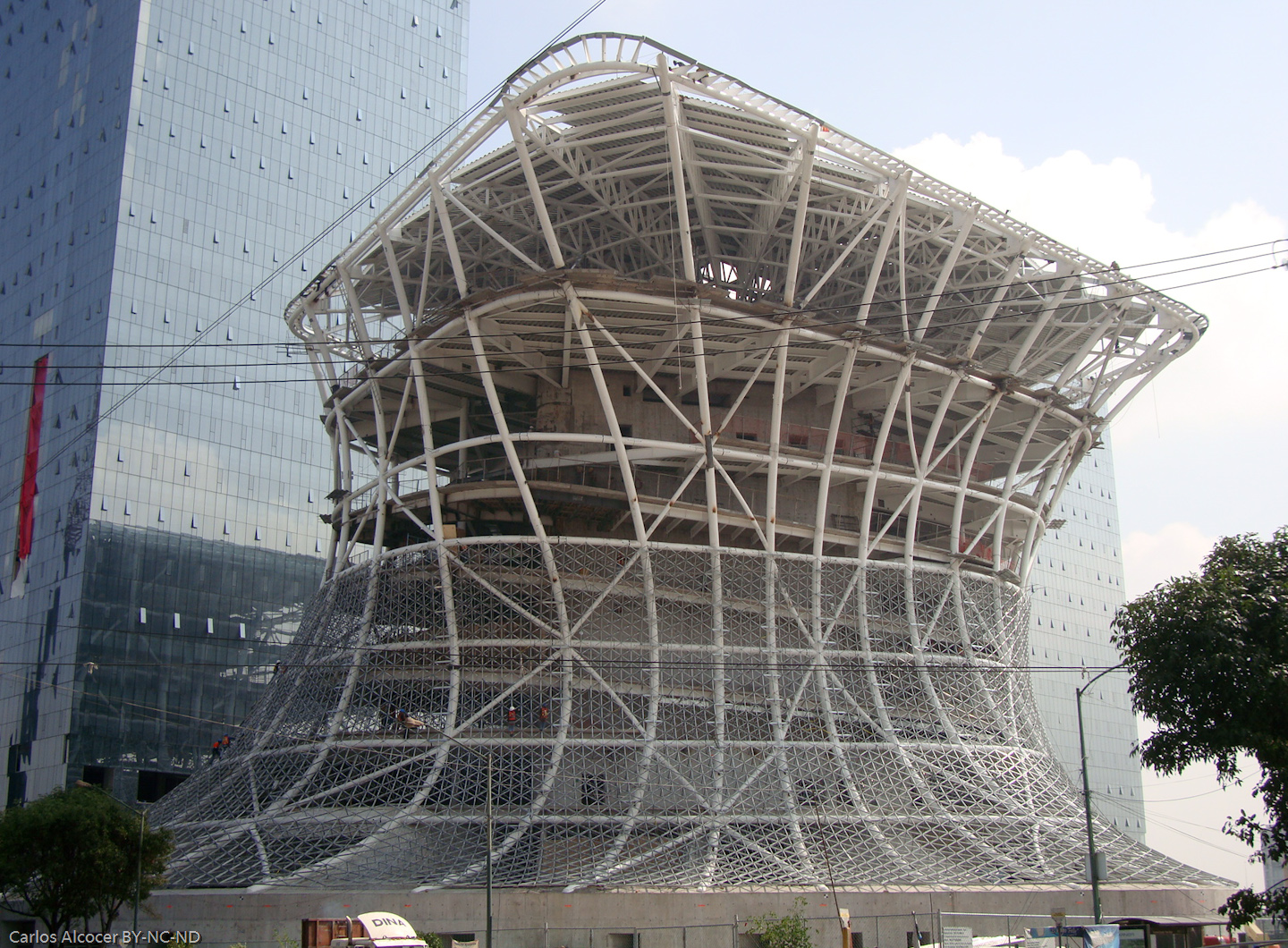
The new Museo Soumaya building under construction in September 2010.

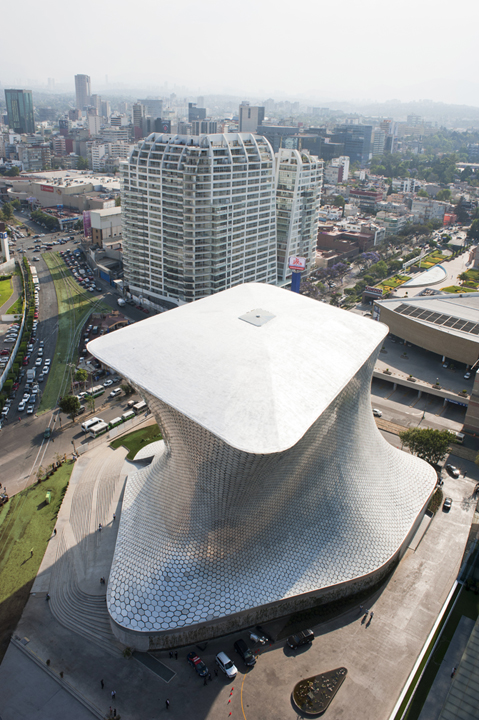
Plaza Carso

Each of the six floors of the museum is distinctly shaped. The weight of the building is held by an exoskeleton of 28 vertical curved steel columns and seven beams encircling the structure built by a Slim-owned company that manufactures offshore oil rigs. In addition, the roof is kept stable through its suspension from a cantilever. The floors are made of high-quality marble that was imported from Greece.

The new location of the Museo Soumaya was officially inaugurated on February 28, 2011 that culminated in a ceremonial ribbon cutting. Notable guests that participated in the ribbon cutting included Felipe Calderón, Gabriel García Márquez, Evelyn Robert de Rothschild, and Larry King. The new building opened to the public on March 28, 2011. Admission to the museum is now free of charge and the operating costs are covered by Slim's fortune, which was the world's largest at the time the new location opened.

The museum is located in a large mixed-use development, Plaza Carso in Nuevo Polanco. This project was also built by Carlos Slim and features many of his companies, as well as a luxury hotel and several apartment buildings. The entire development cost almost $800 million to build.

==== Rooms ====
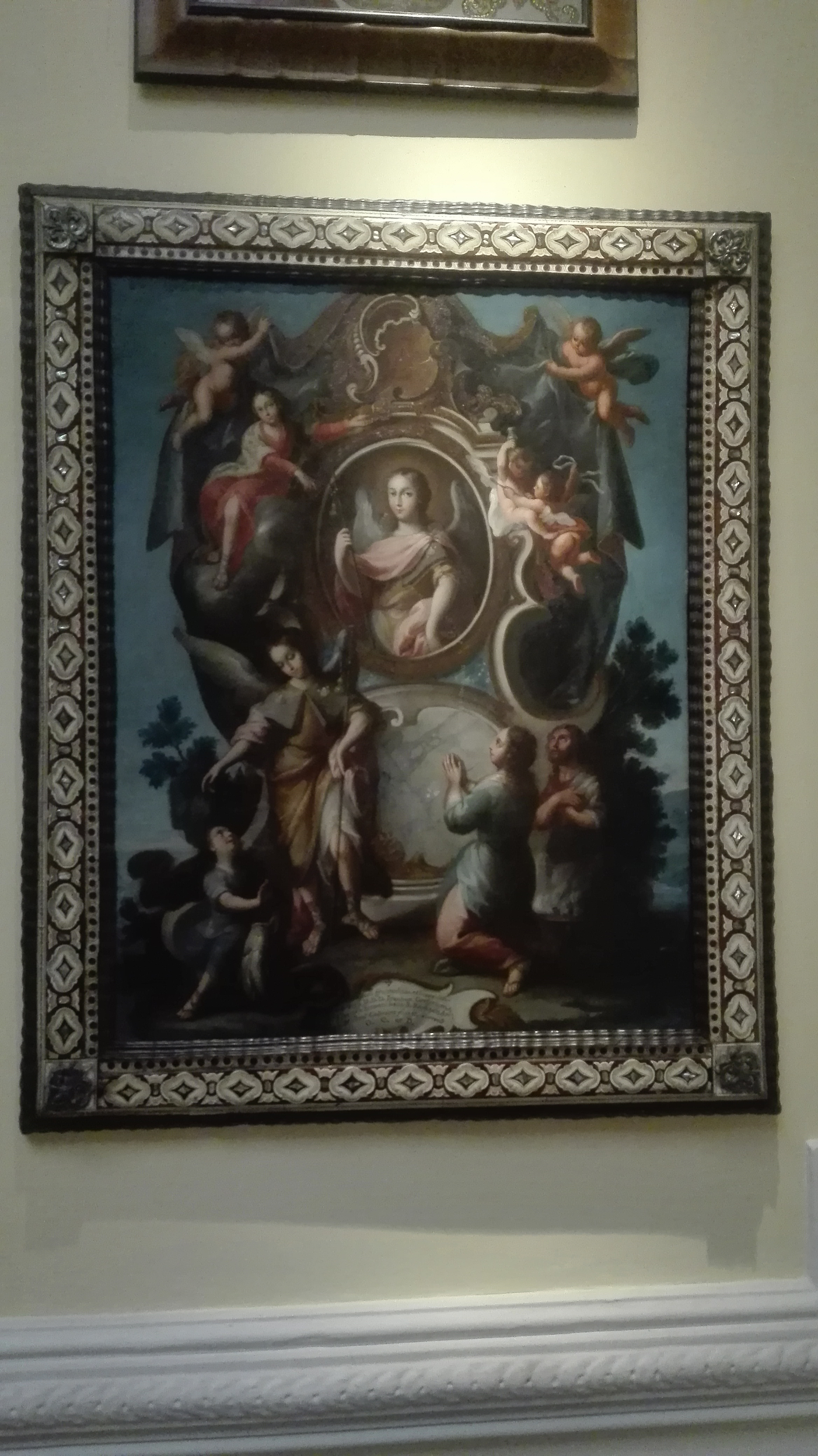
Miguel Cabrera, Archangel Raphael (c. 1745–1768), the lobby of the House Museum Guillermo Tovar de Teresa.

- Entrance: This foyer area is an asymmetric, high-ceiling vestibule. This space is devoted to temporary exhibitions, events, and the permanent exhibits of large-format works: The Thinker by Auguste Rodin, Río Juchitán, the last mural by Diego Rivera, Still life by Rufino Tamayo, Day and night by Rufino Tamayo, and Pieta, cast in bronze in the 19th century by Ferdinando Marinelli Artistic Foundry from the original marble by Michelangelo Buonarroti.
- Level 1: Gold and silver: decorative arts. Collection of coins, medals, and banknotes dating from the Viceroyalty to the post-revolutionary era. There are also objects in ivory, silk, and precious stones for religious and civil use.
- Level 2: Temporary exhibitions
- Level 3: European and Novohispanic Old Masters. Works of European artists such as the Cranachs, Tintoretto, el Greco, Peter Paul Rubens, Artemisia Gentileschi, and Murillo, with Colonial works by, among others, Villalpando, Juárez, Cabrera, and Páez.
- Level 4: From Impressionism to the Avant-garde. Landscape and costumbrist works of 19th-century Mexico by Chapman, Rugendas, Egerton, Linati, Baron Gros, Löhr, Landesio and Velasco together with works from the European movements and vanguards, by Manet, Claude Monet, Pierre-Auguste Renoir, Edgar Degas, Camille Pissarro, Vincent van Gogh, Vlaminck, Marc Chagall, and Joan Miró.
- Level 5: (temporary) : Venice Museo Soumaya Collection.
- Level 6: Julián and Linda Slim / The Rodin Era. Works by Rodin and his pupils and associates, such as Camille Claudel and Émile-Antoine Bourdelle. The surrealist sculptures by Salvador Dalí are exhibited on this level.

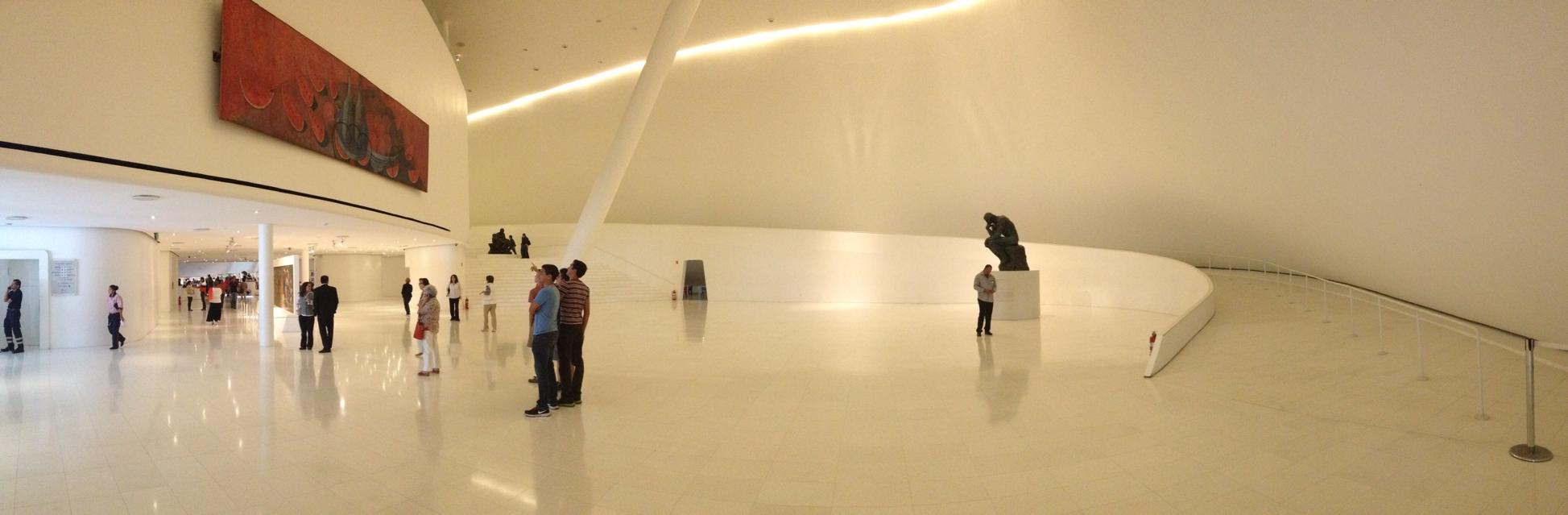
A panoramic photograph of the entrance floor in Museo Soumaya.

== Critical reception ==
Slim himself described the museum as his attempt to increase the "humanistic capital" of Mexico City. He has noted that since many Mexicans cannot afford to travel to Europe to view art collections there, it was important to house a prestigious collection of European art in Mexico itself. Some commentators, including Larry King, have predicted that the museum will cause an increase in the number of tourists from the United States who visit Mexico City.

Headlines such as "Carlos Slim's Xanadu?: Reactions to the World's Richest Man's Overweening New Museo Soumaya", "Emperor's New Museum", and "Photos: World's Richest Man Opens World's Flashiest Museum" reflect criticisms of Carlos Slim as a business man, the quality of the work exhibited, and the quality of the building.

Initial reviews were mixed between praising the bold exterior design and criticizing the interior and art collection. The Columbia Journal noted it appeared as a "sequined anvil" with the hexagonal aluminum scales, critiquing the interior as having the feel of "somewhere between a fancy Chelsea gallery and a luxury mall" that provided a "claustrophobic feel" (noting that plans for light by Romero were blocked by Slim for financial reasons), and that "Discord between the art and the layout of the rooms contributes to the sense of chaos." In its review, The Architect's Newspaper noted that the design of the exterior was strong on formality, "the same cannot be said about the interior. While the outside is a complex, and somewhat convoluted shape, the inside is an awkward compromise between promenade and envelope. The relation between outside and inside is neither intrinsic nor well established, and the building negates the seemingly self-supporting structure." "The Soumaya, while a gorgeous object, rises pretentiously, with troubled construction techniques and flawed exhibition design." The Los Angeles Times' Pulitzer Prize-winning art critic Christopher Knight noted the exterior "does add a striking profile to a redeveloping section of the city's upscale Polanco neighborhood" but that "the small shock is just how weak the museum's collection is, and how poorly the paintings, sculptures and decorative arts have been installed in the open floor plan galleries." Mexican artist Yoshua Okón parodied the design as fancy toilet.

In a 2014 tour of Mexico City architecture, The New York Times summarized the museum as "one of those buildings that, love or hate it, you can't stop looking at. There are so many variations of color, light and form that your eye never gets enough." The Lonely Planet guide notes the collection "contains worthy Rivera and Siqueiros murals and paintings by French impressionists, but there's too much filler." In 2022, the Los Angeles Times summarized the building's reputation, noting it "is renowned for looking great on Instagram ... and that's about it. Its internal layout does not do the art — or anything else, for that matter — any favors."

== Gallery ==
=== 15th to 16th century ===
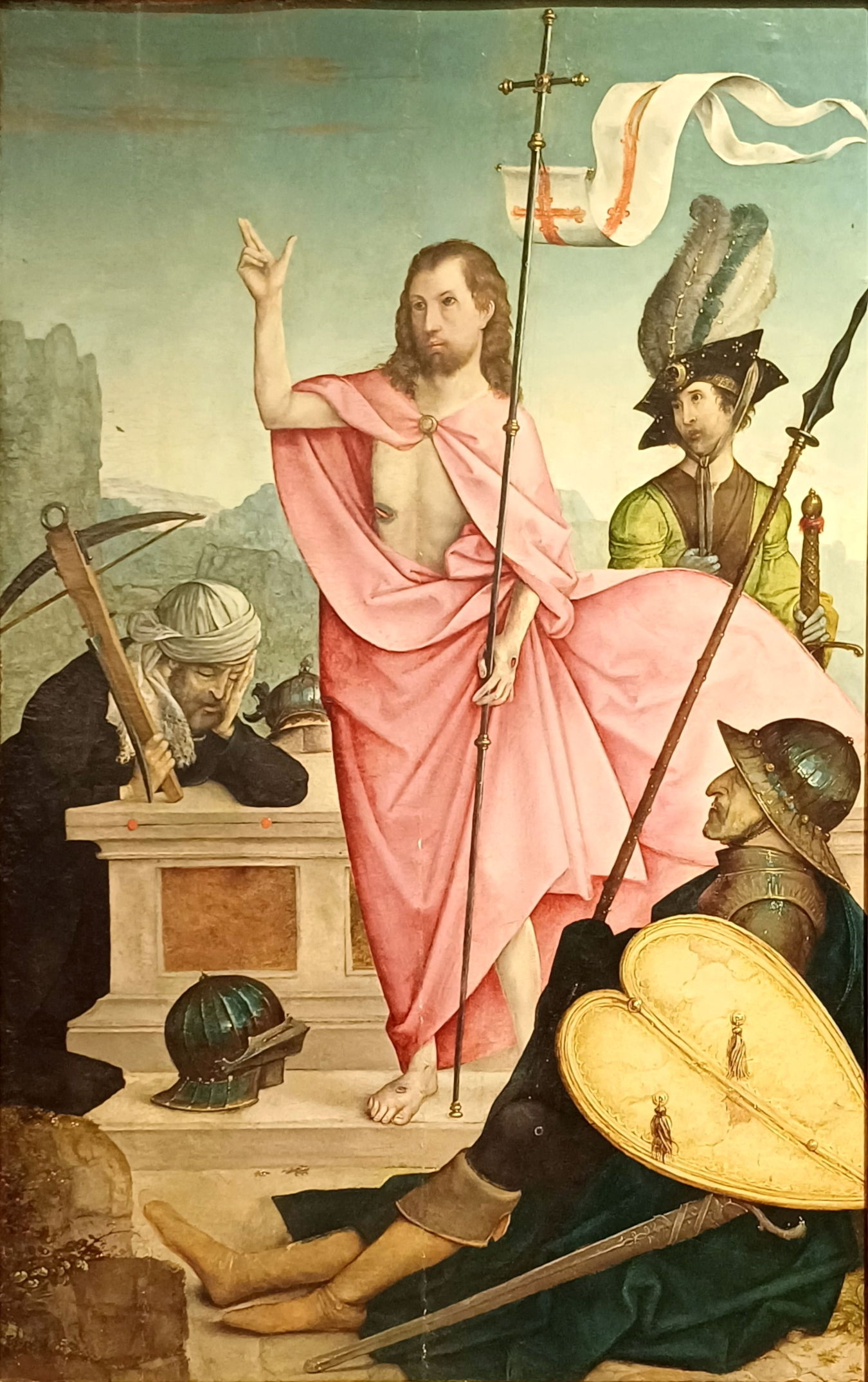
La resurrección de Cristo, 1508, by Juan de Flandes.

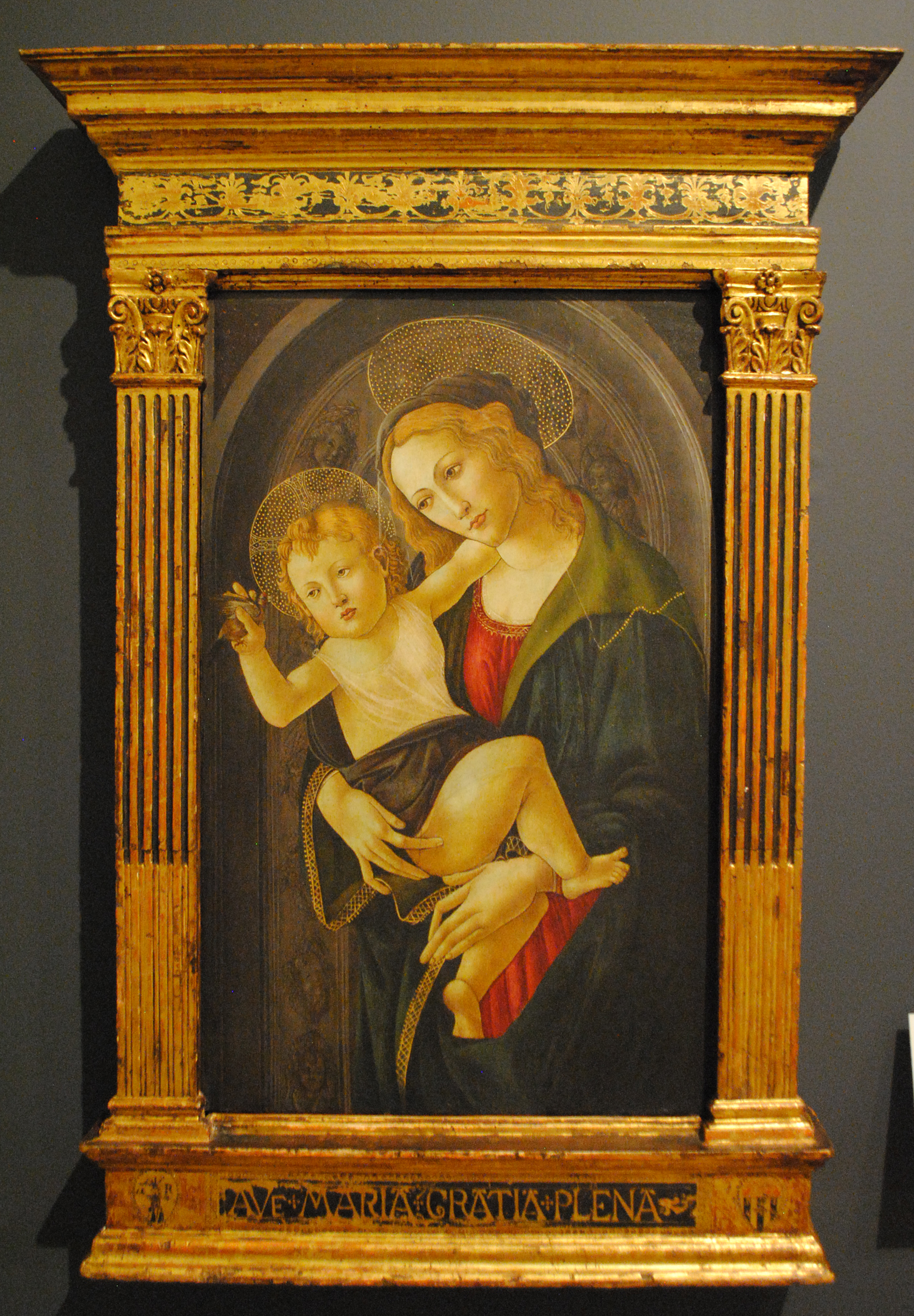
La Virgen y el Niño en un nicho, 1476, by Sandro Botticelli and workshop.

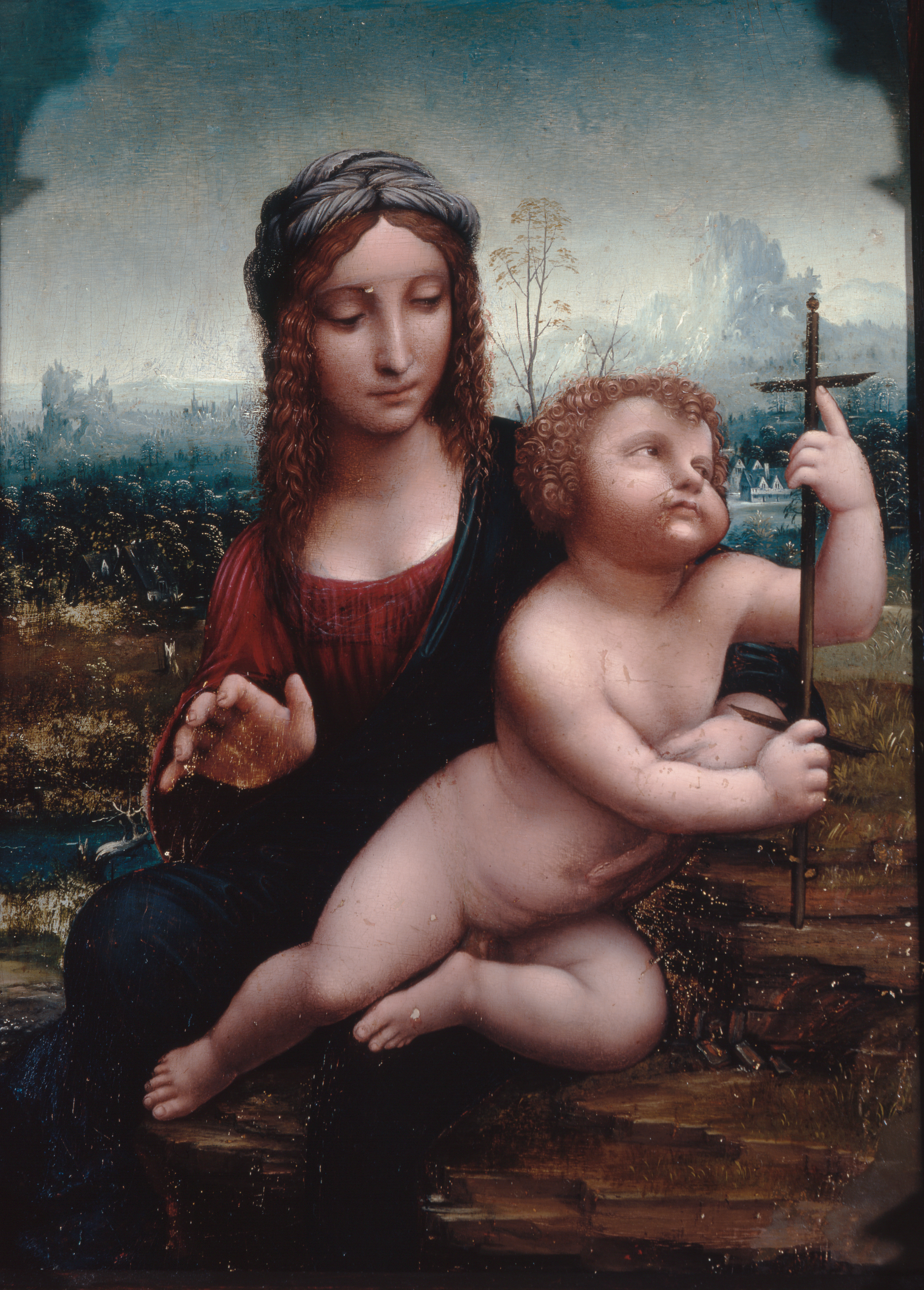
Virgen del huso, c. 1501–1540, workshop of Leonardo da Vinci.

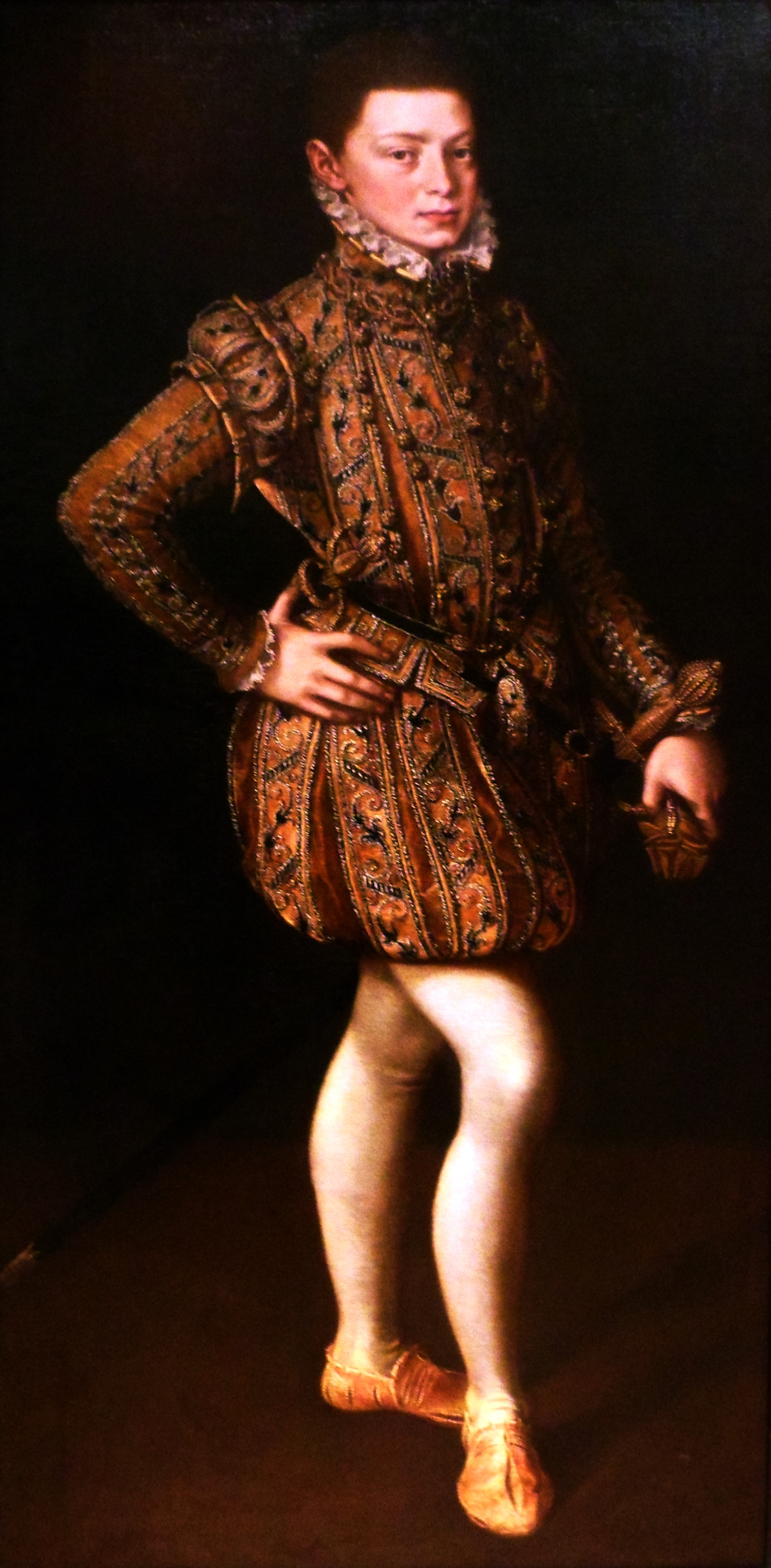
Don Juan de Austria, 1560, of Alonso Sánchez Coello.

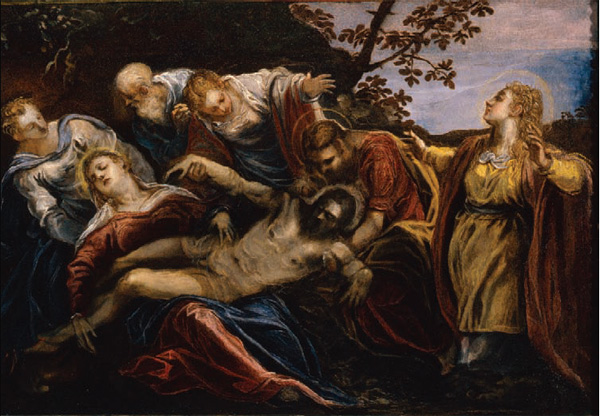
Tintoretto - Deploration of Christ, c. 1556-59

=== From Ancient Mexico to Modern ===
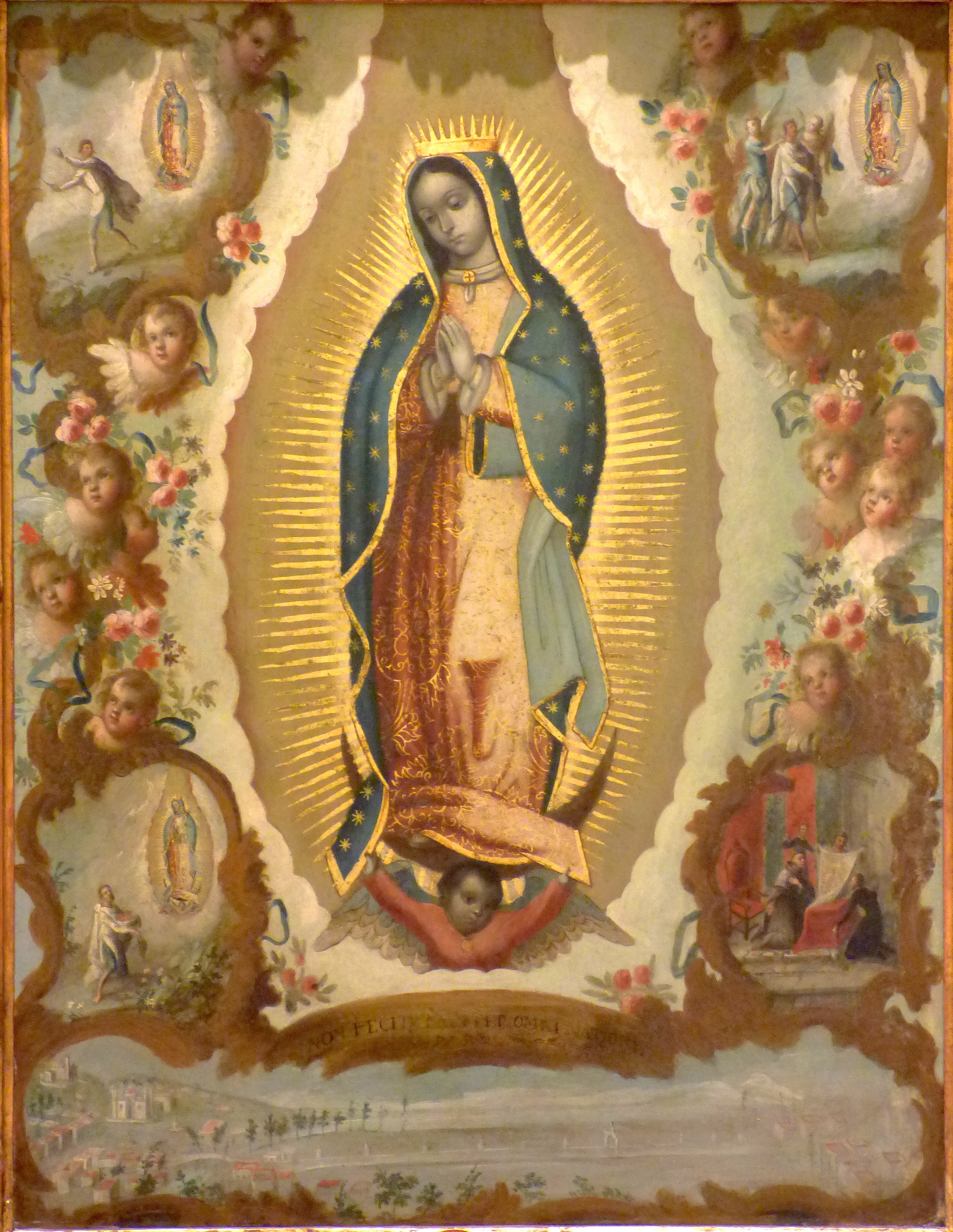
Virgen de Guadalupe con las cuatro apariciones by Juan de Sáenz

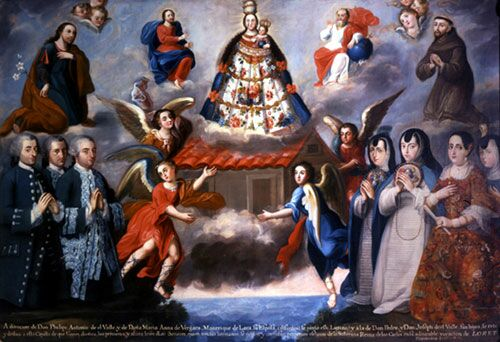
Josep Antonio de Ayala, The del Valle family at the feet the Virgin of Loreto, 1769. In the collections of the Museo Soumaya

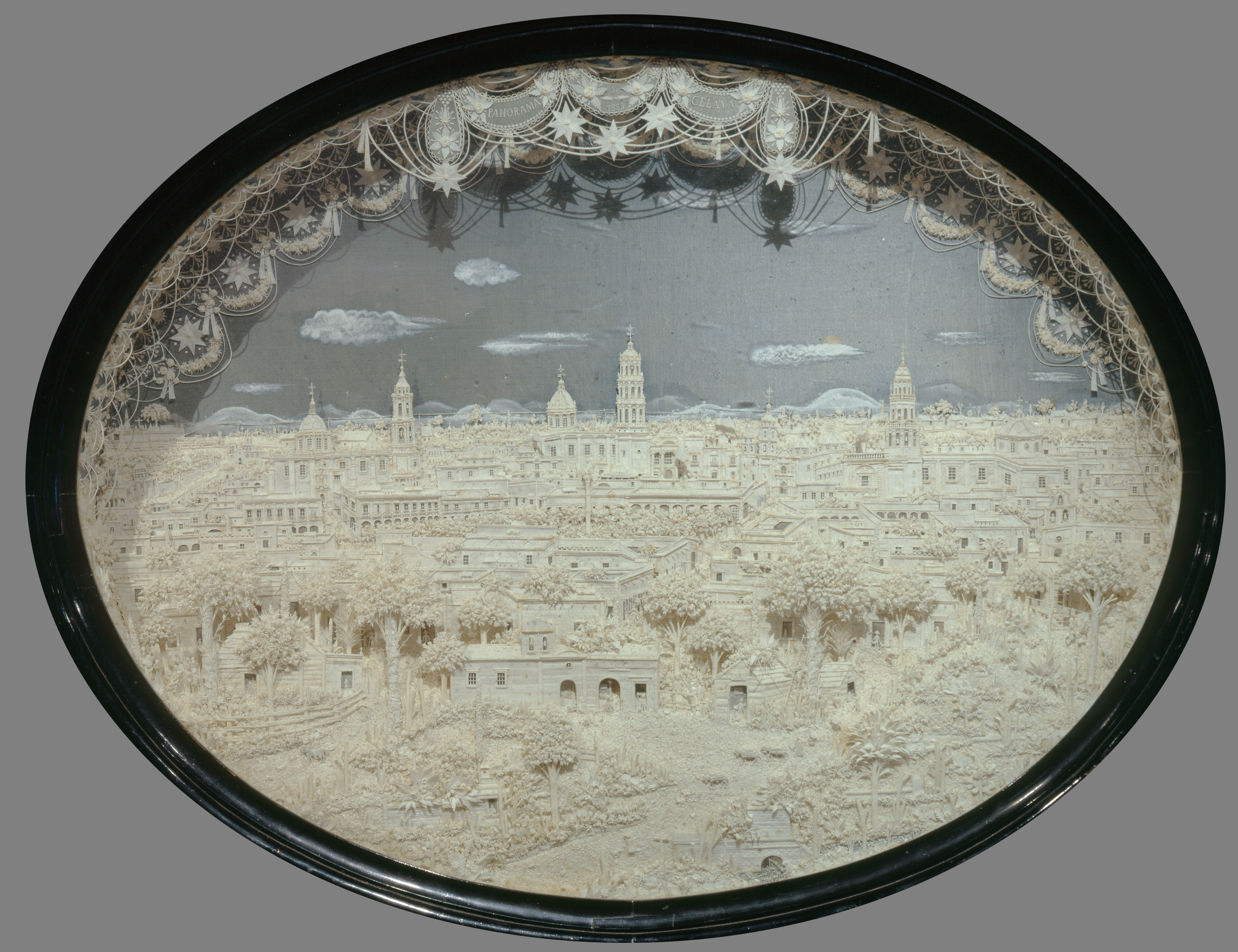
Panorama of the city of Celaya made from rice paper

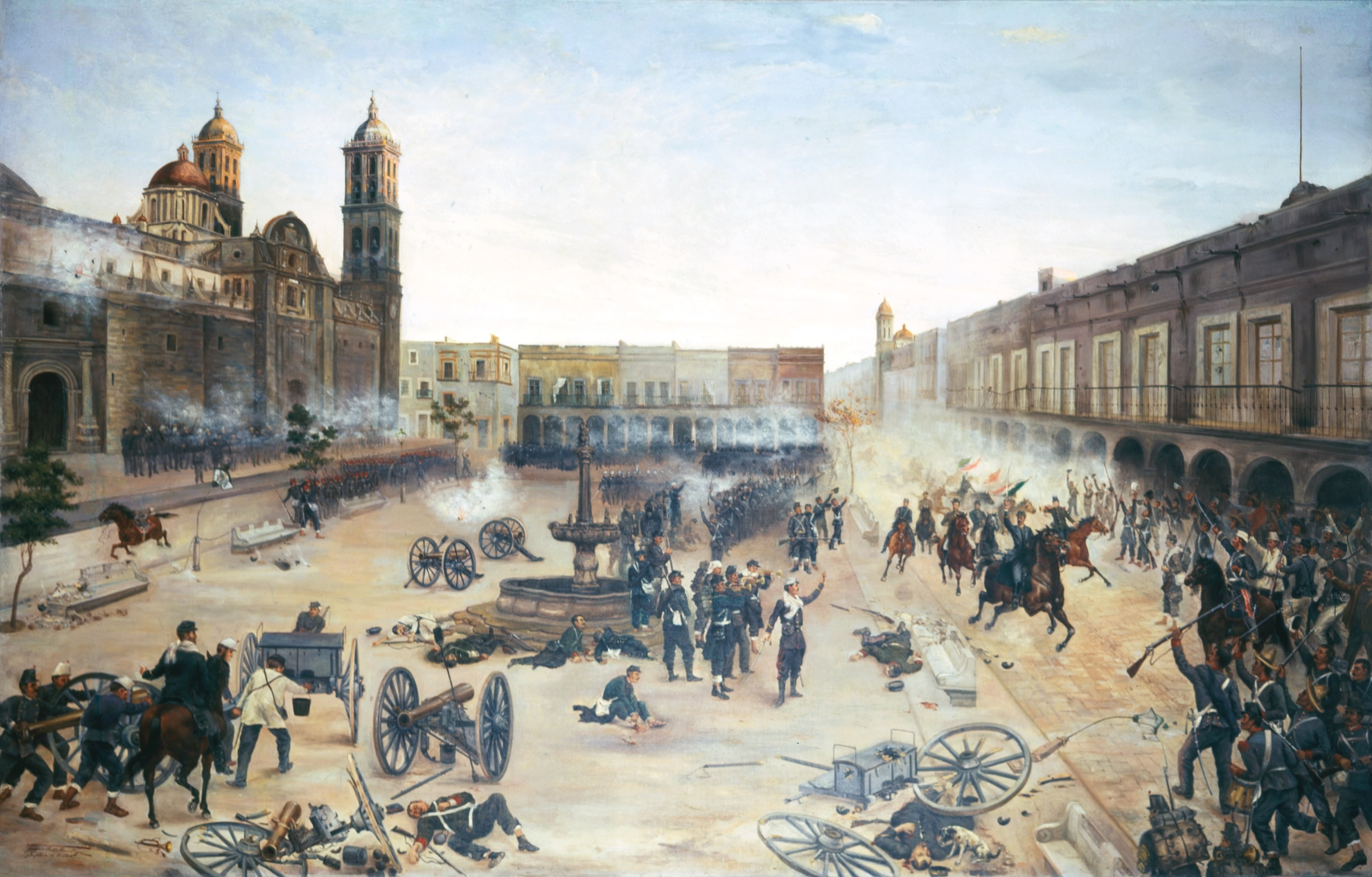
2 de abril de 1867. Entrada del general Porfirio Díaz a Puebla, 1902, by Francisco de Paula Mendoza.

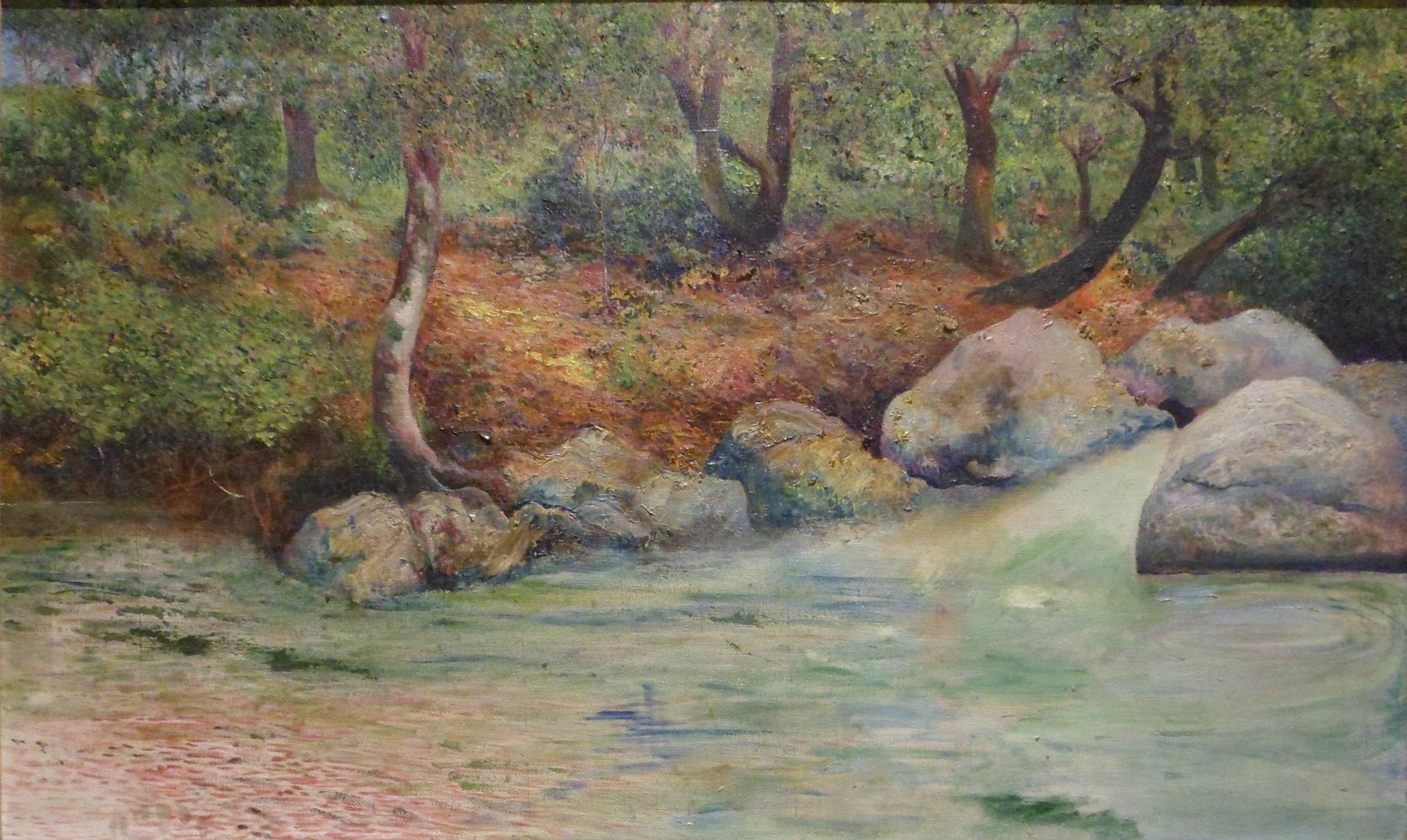
Paisaje con bosque y río, early 20th century, by Joaquín Clausell

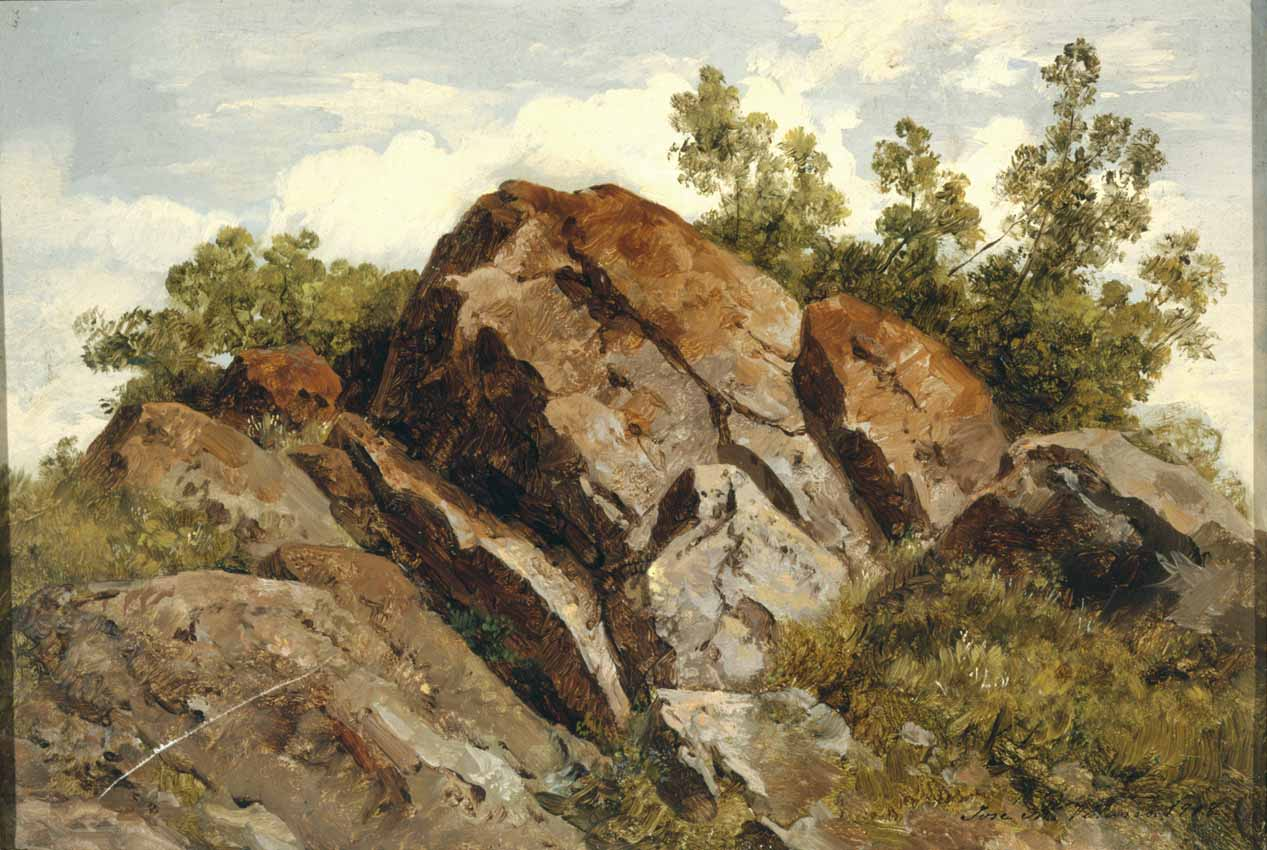
José María Velasco - Rocks

=== European and Novohispanic Old Masters ===
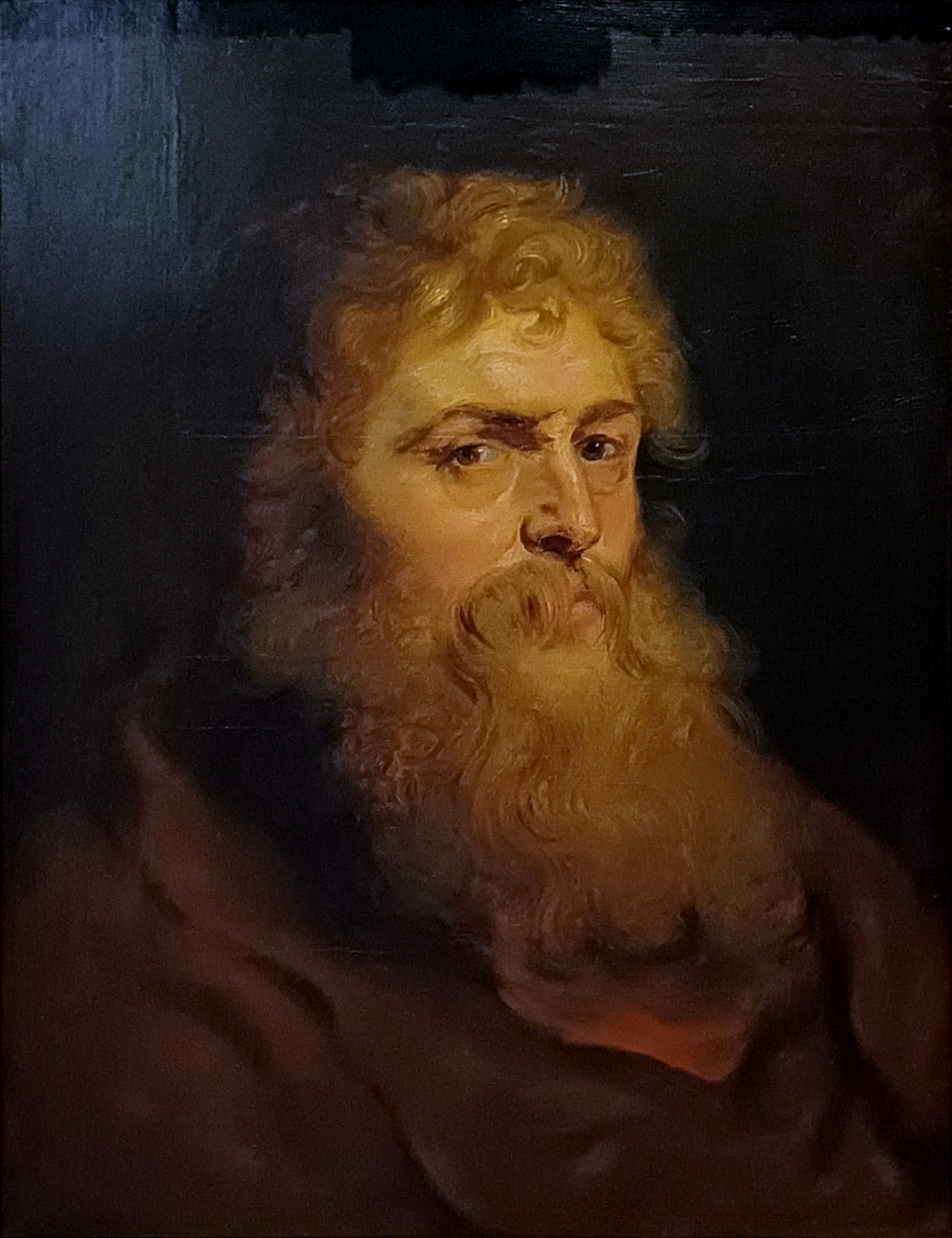
Peter Paul Rubens - Cabeça de homem barbado, 1617-1618.

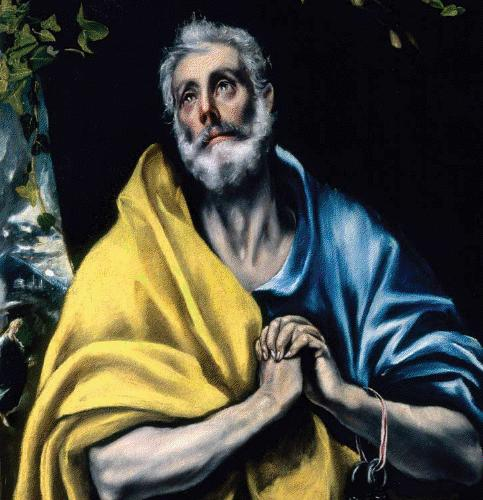
El Greco - The Tears of Saint Peter

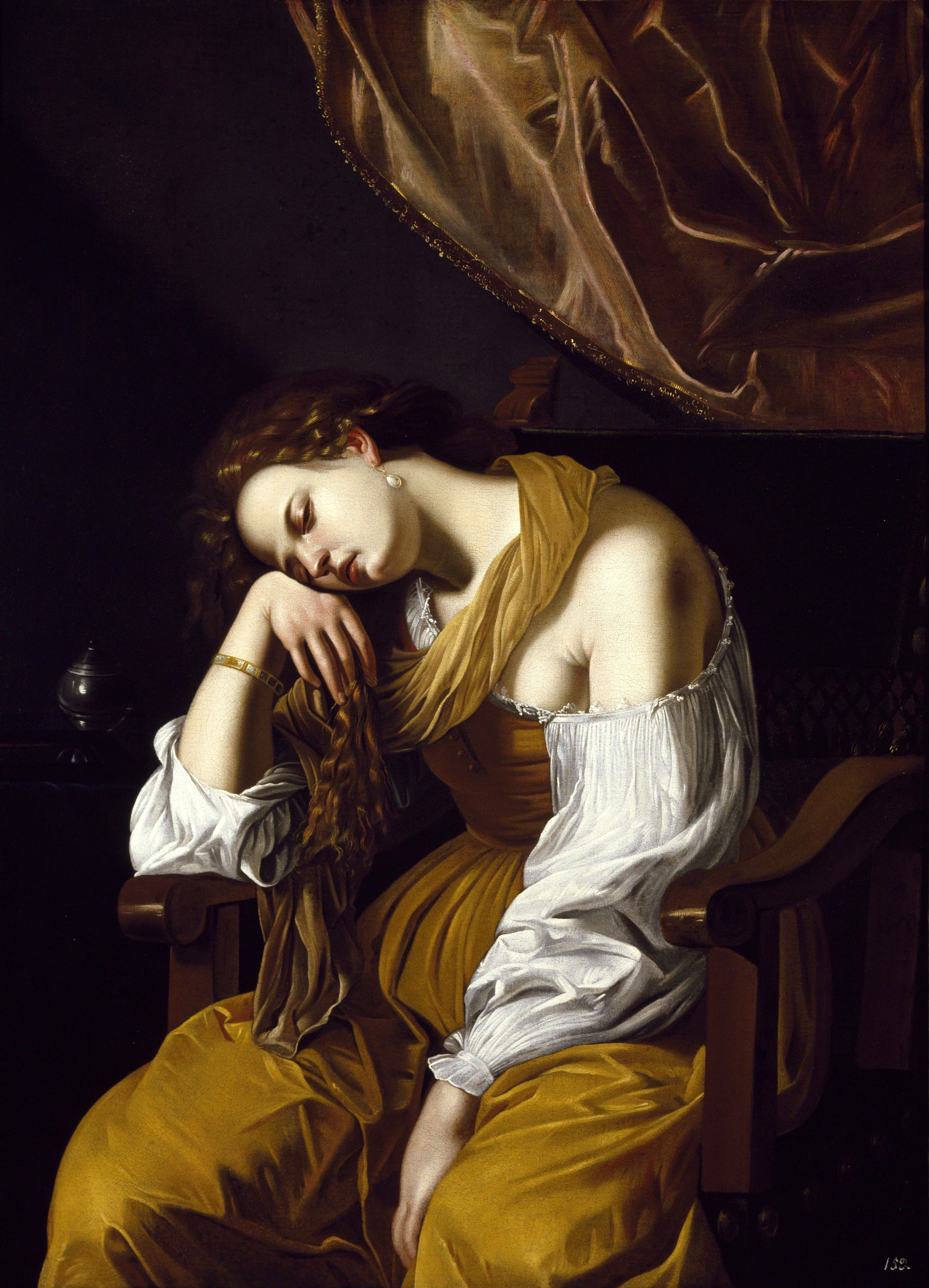
Mary Magdalene as the Melancholy by Artemisia Gentileschi

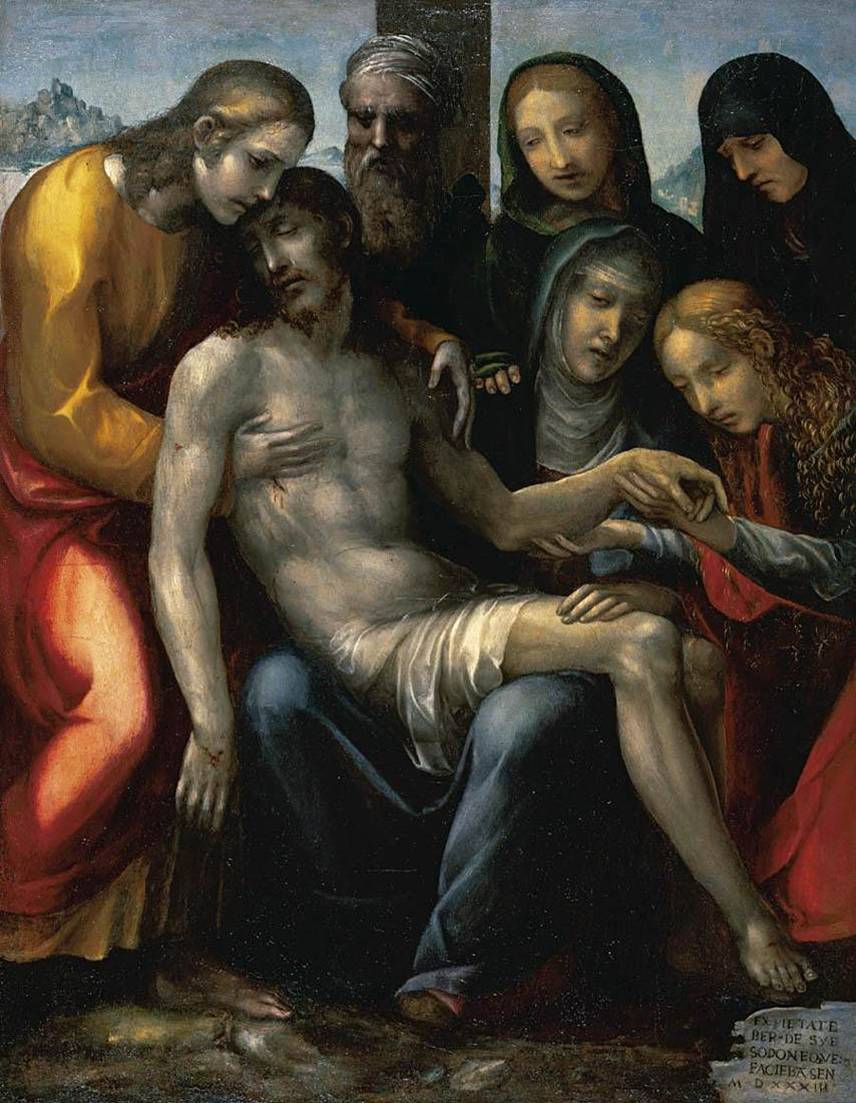
Il Sodoma - Pietà, 1533.

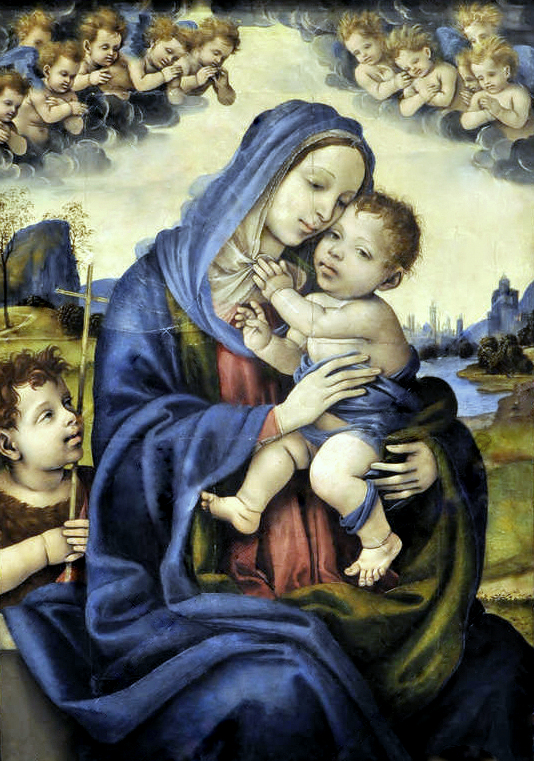
Filippino Lippi. Virgem com o Menino e São João Batista, 1502-1504.

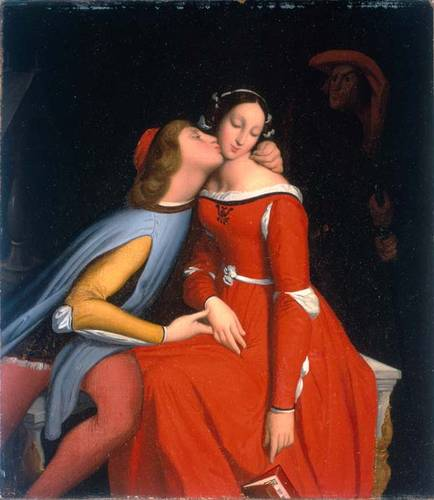
Jean-Auguste Dominique Ingres. Paolo e Francesca, s.d.

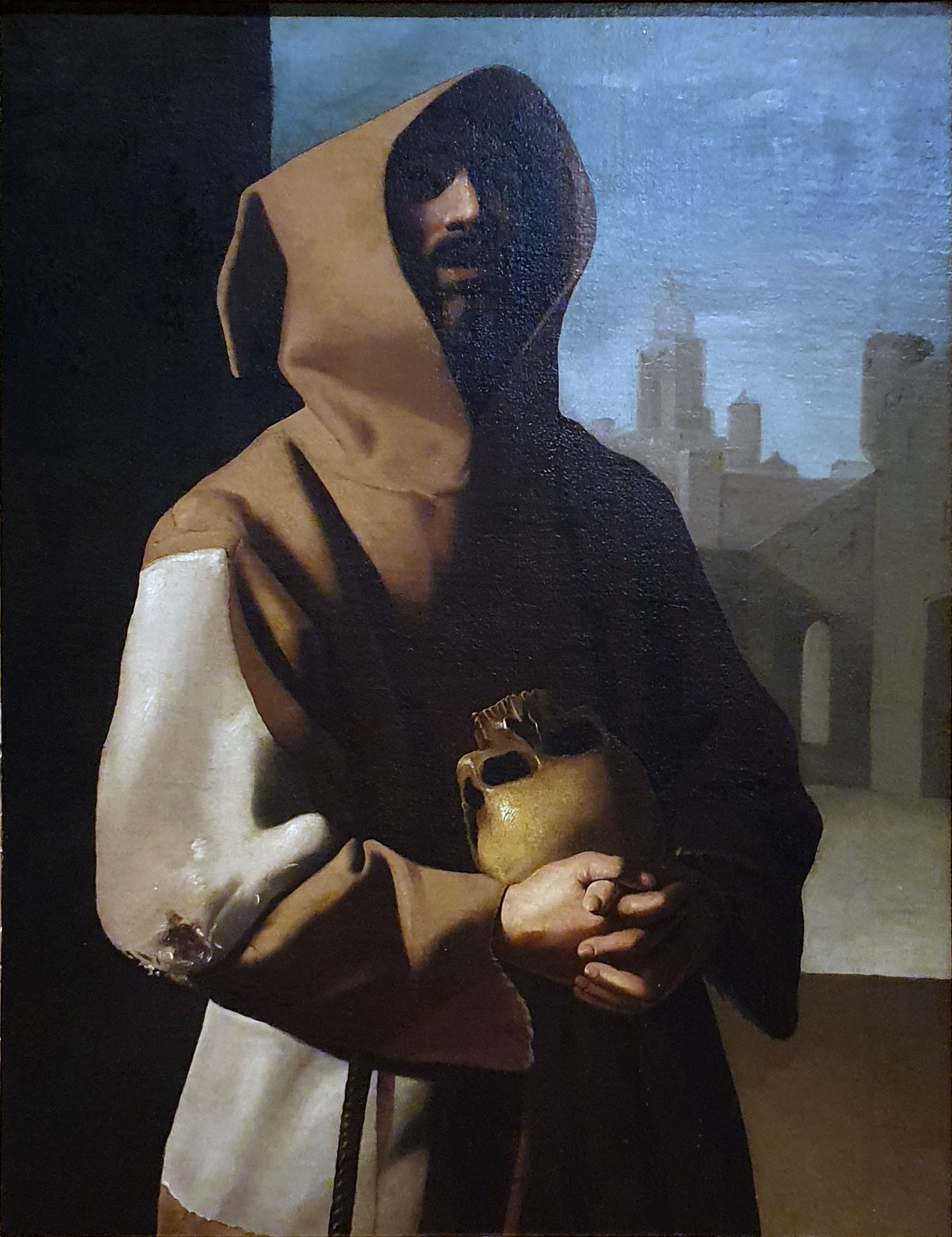
Francisco de Zurbarán. São Francisco de Assis em êxtase, 1635-1640.

=== From Impressionism to the Avant-garde ===
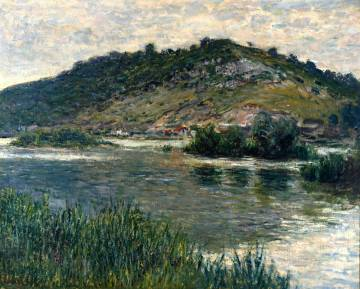
Paisaje en Port-Villez, 1883, by Claude Monet

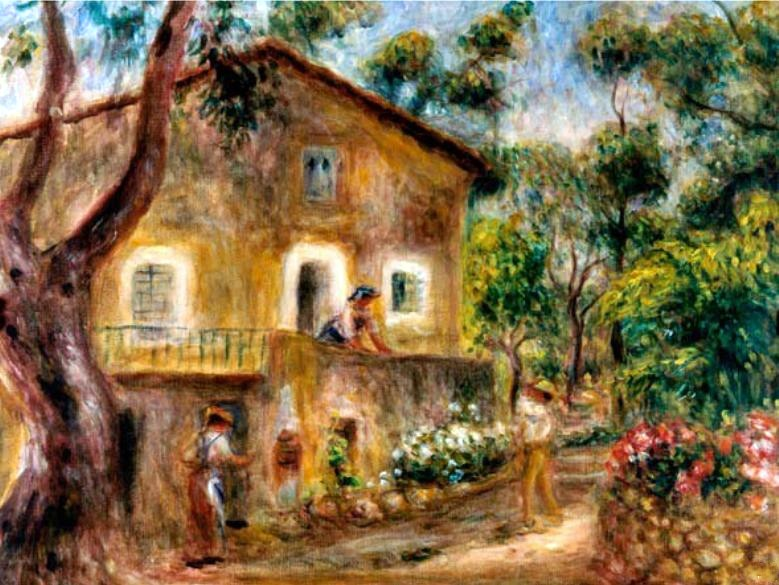
La casa de Collettes en Cagnes, 1912, by Pierre-Auguste Renoir

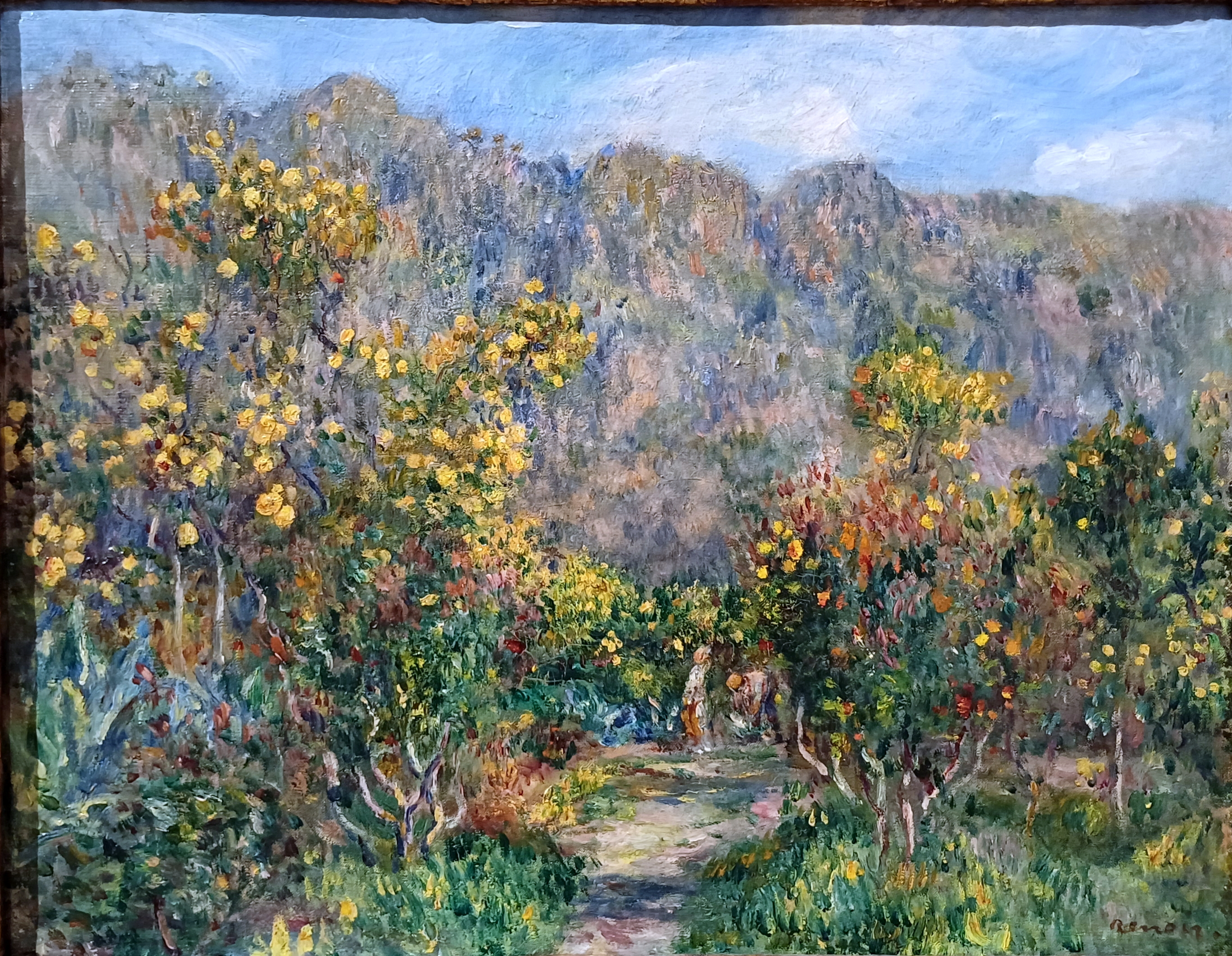
Pierre-Auguste Renoir. Parque de Les Collettes, 1912.

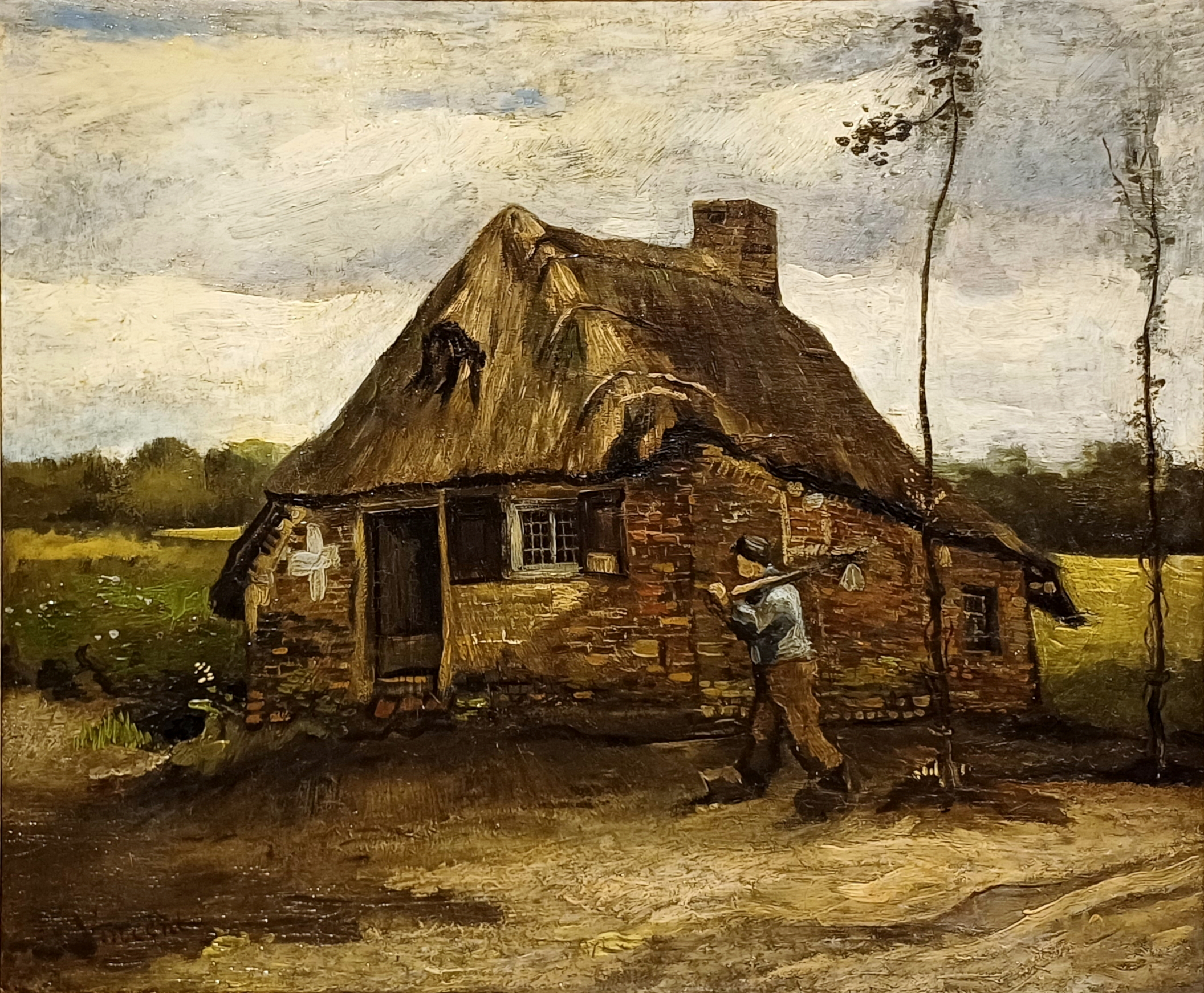
Vincent van Gogh Cabin with farmer

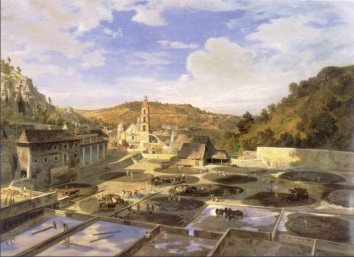
Courtyard of the Hacienda de Regla (1857) by Eugenio Landesio
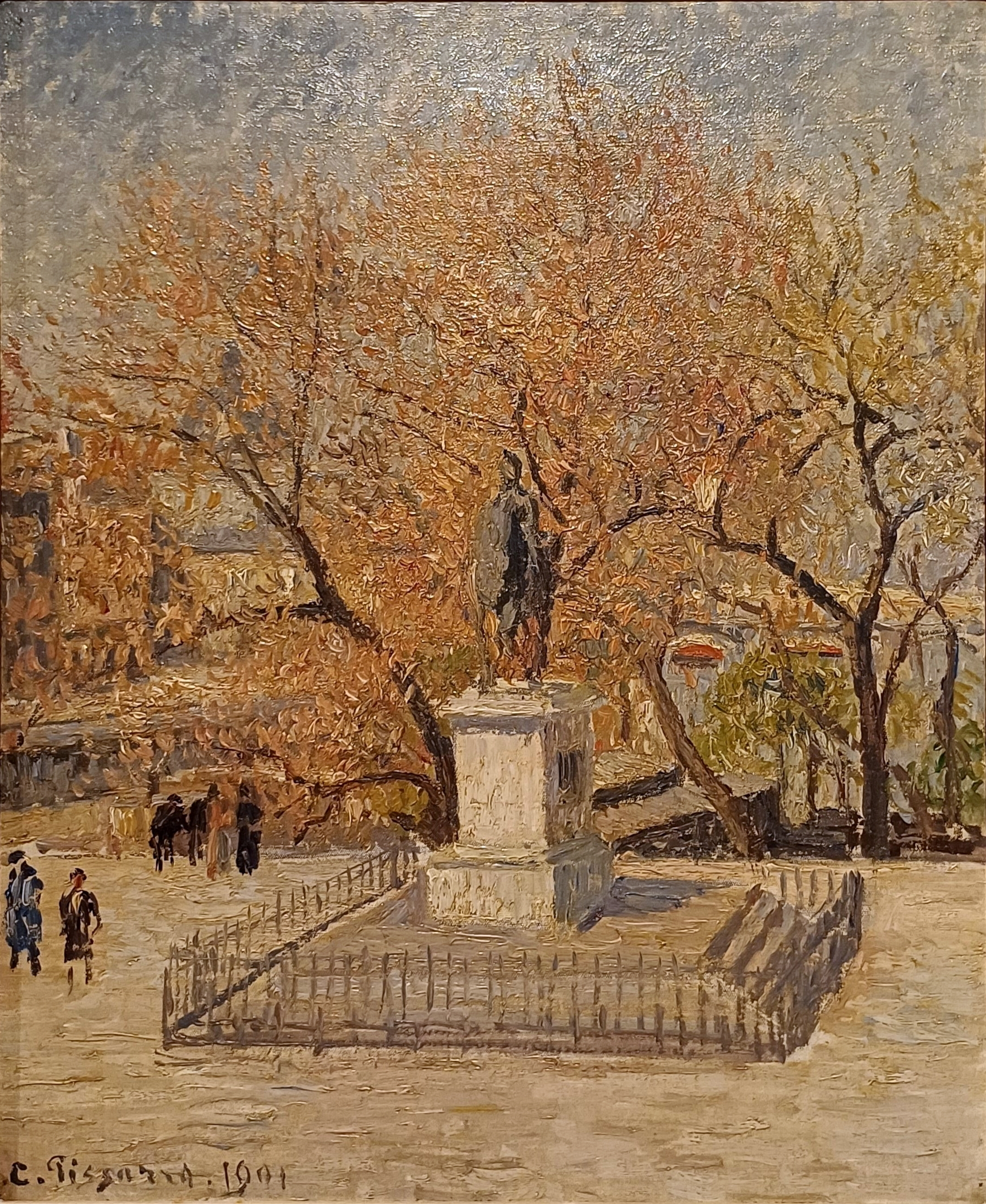
Statue d’Henri IV, 1901, by Camille Pissarro

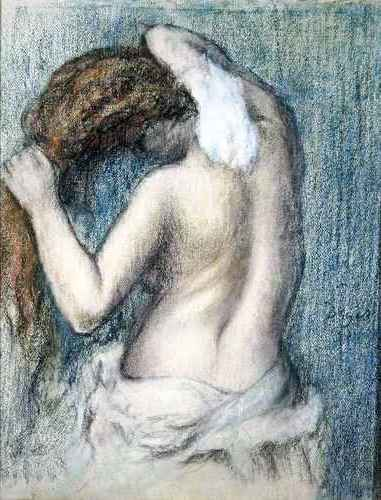
Woman Washing, c. 1906, by Edgar Degas.

== Sculpture by the French artist Auguste Rodin ==
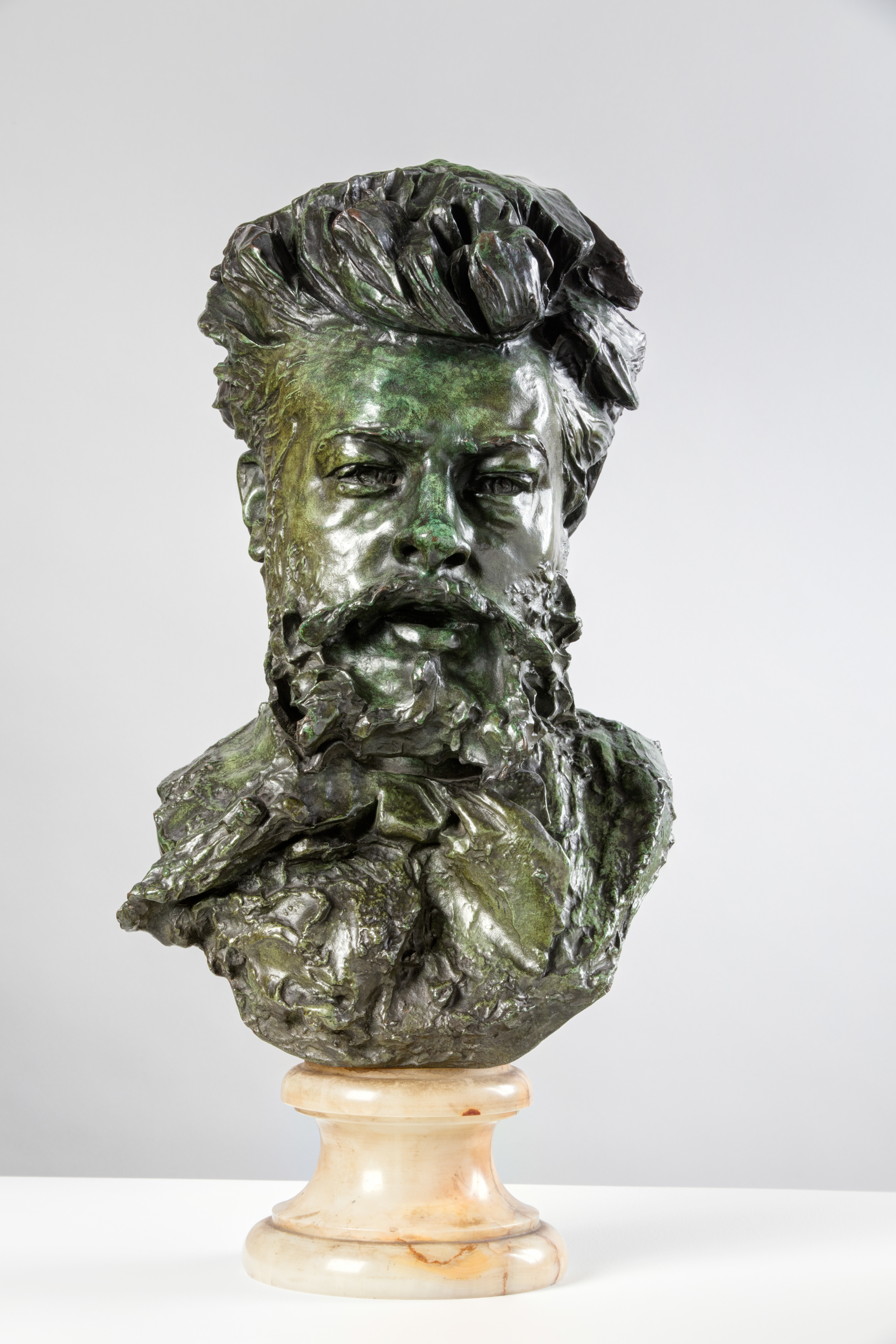
Bust of Maurice Haquette

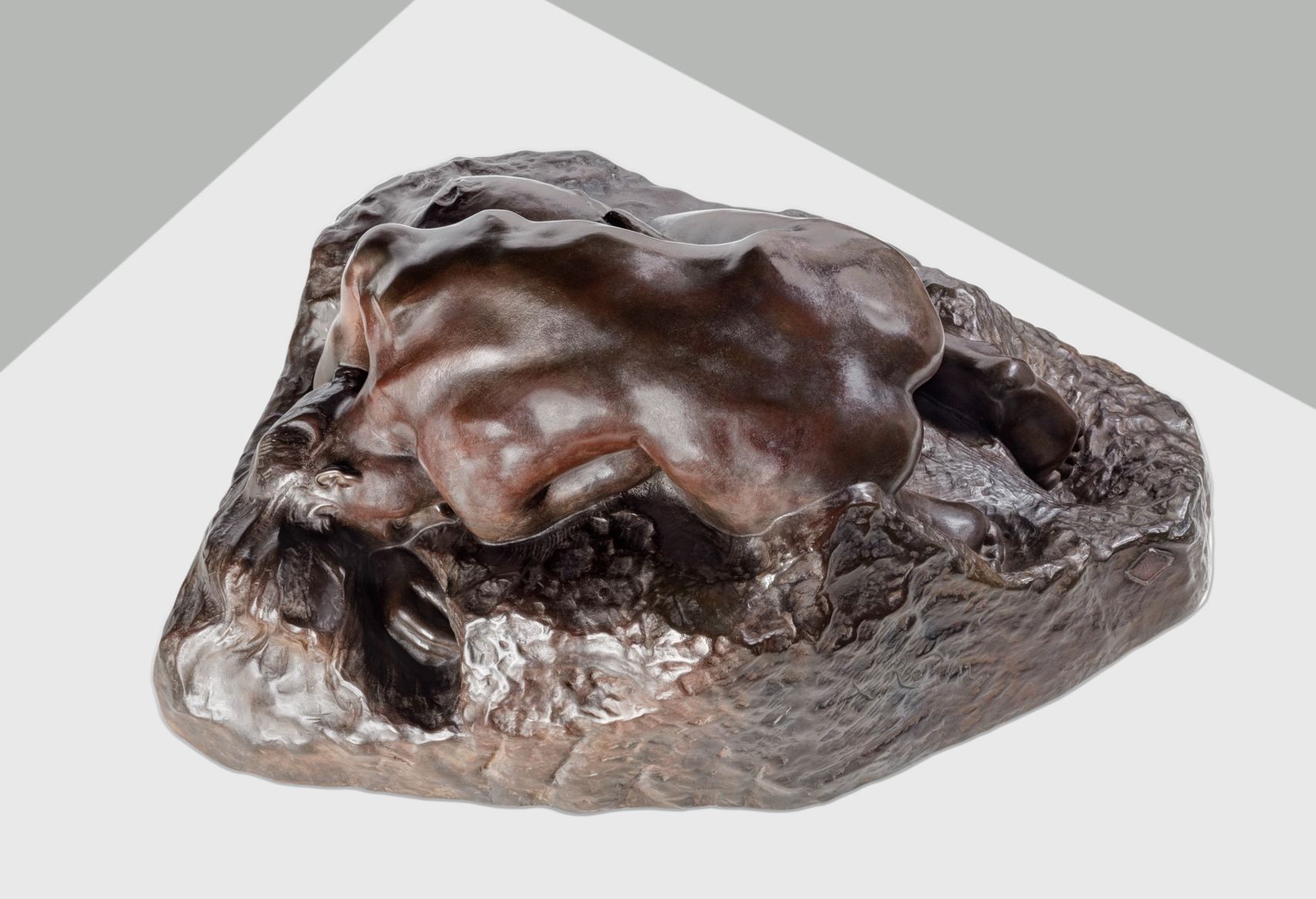
Danaid

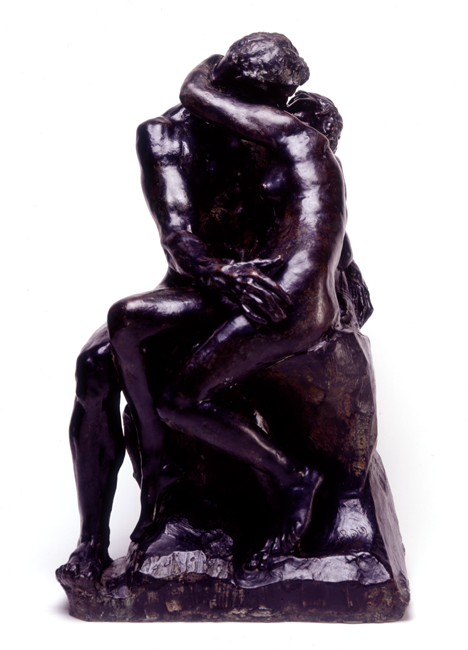
The Kiss

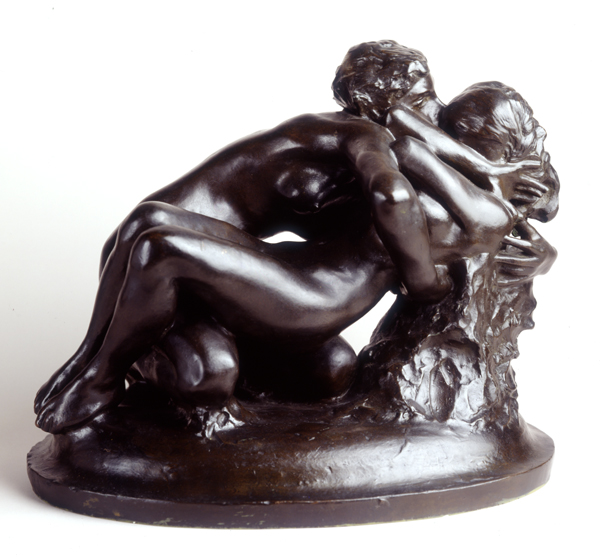
Ovid's Metamorphoses

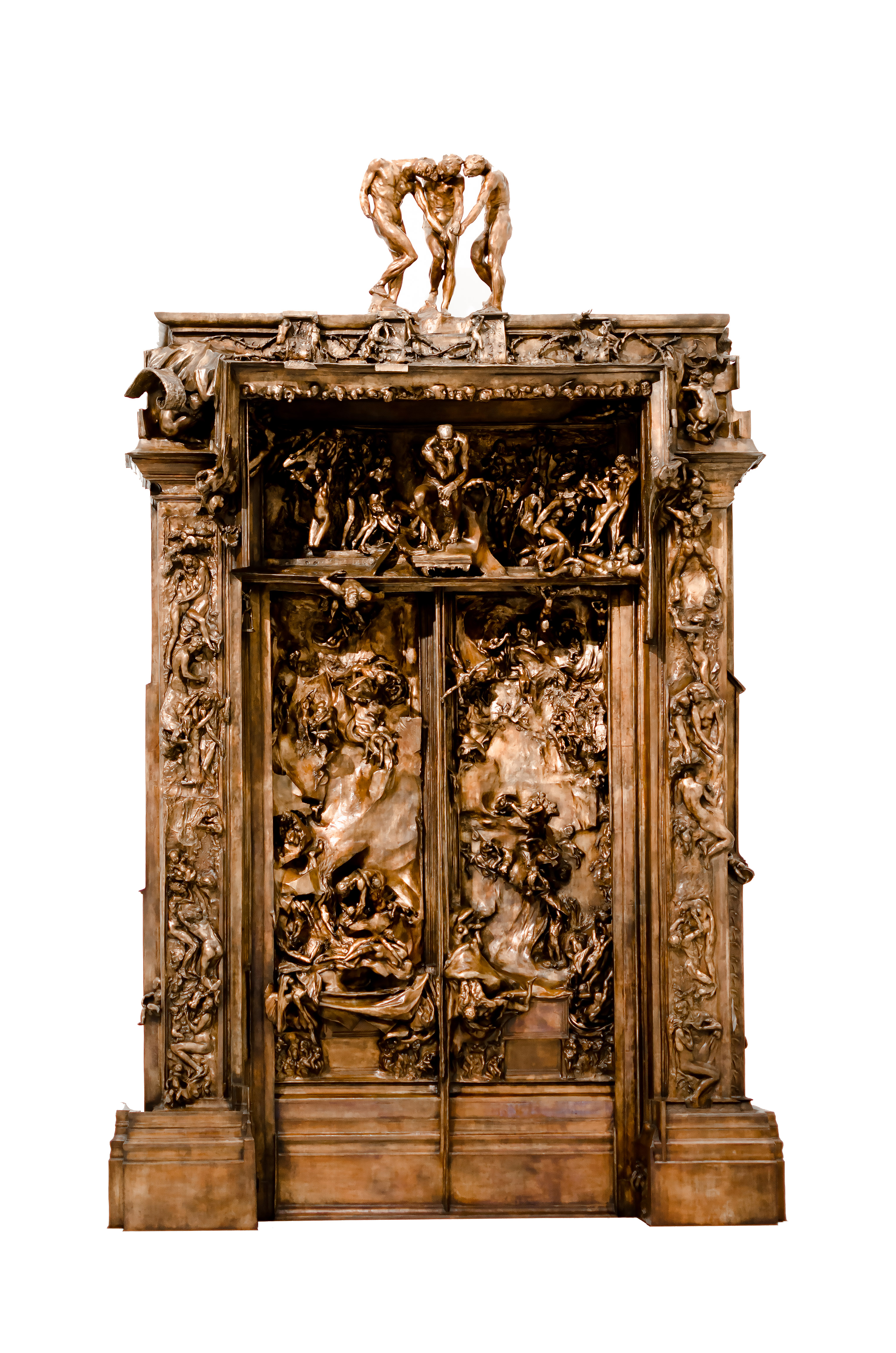
The Gates of Hell
