= Bartholomeus Molenaer =

Dutch painter

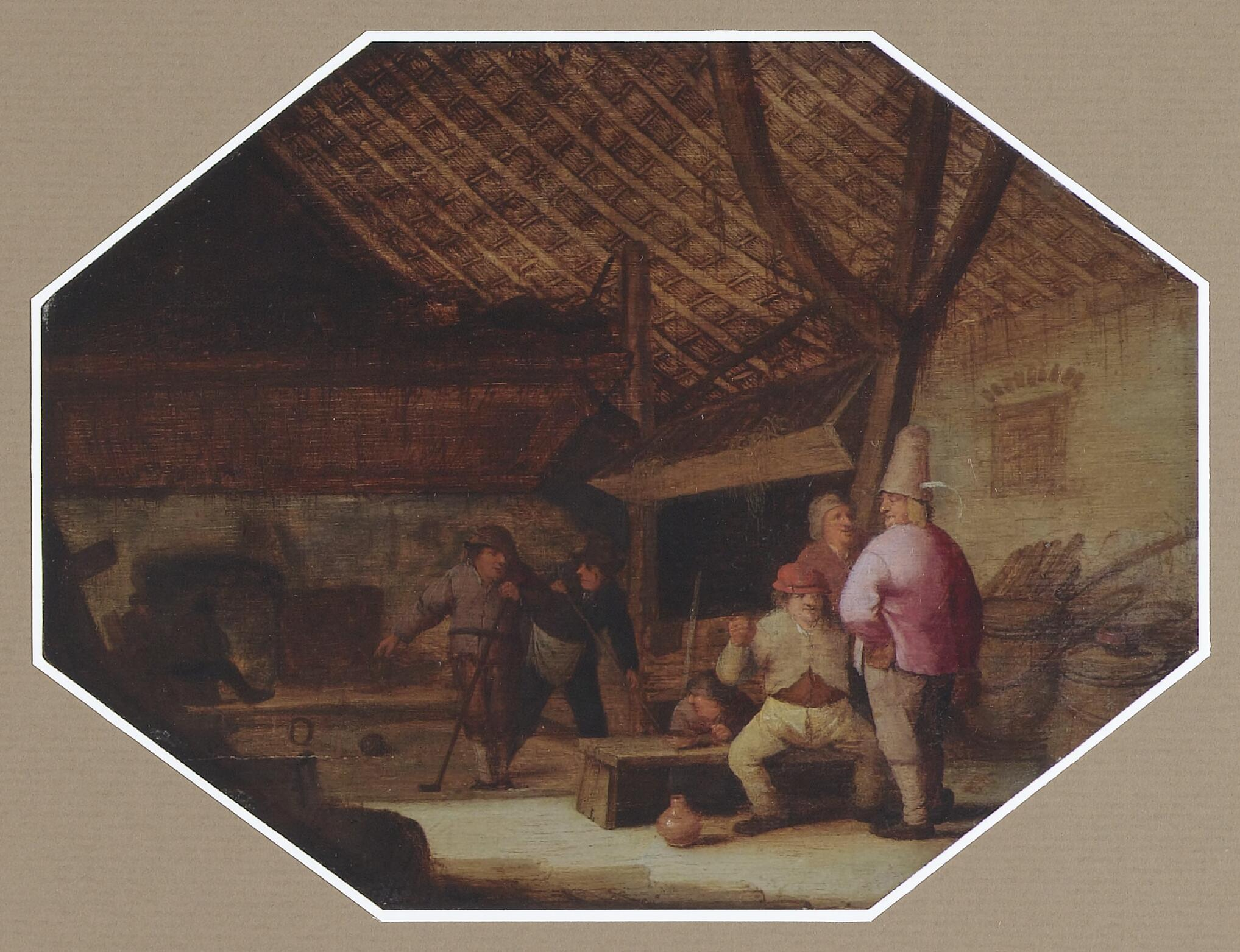
Peasants playing kolf

Bartholomeus Molenaer (1618 in Haarlem – early September 1650, in Haarlem) was a Dutch Golden Age genre painter.

His parents were a tailor Jan Mientsen Molenaer and his second wife, Grietgen Adriaensdr. According to the RKD he was the brother of the painters Nicolaes and Jan Miense Molenaer. He became a member of the Haarlem Guild of St. Luke in 1640. The next year, 1641 he got married, and till 1646 lived by his brother Jan Miense at Lombaertsteech (Lombardsteeg). He was a genre painter who painted many peasants in interiors, often with a shadow in the lower left of the painting. His works were influenced by contemporary artists like Adriaen Brouwer and Adriaen van Ostade.
