= Ovid's Metamorphoses (sculpture) =

Sculpture by Auguste Rodin

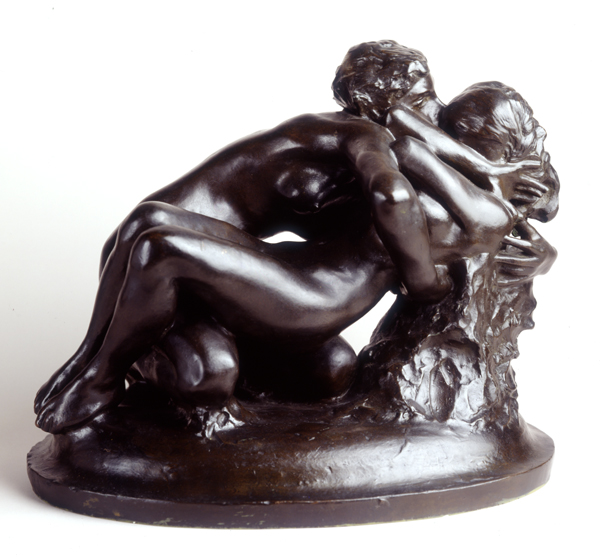
- Artist: Auguste Rodin
- Year: 1886-1889
- Medium: Bronze

Ovid's Metamorphoses or The Satyrs is a sculpture by Auguste Rodin, created as part of The Gates of Hell.

== Inspiration ==
It draws on the tale of Salmacis and Hermaphroditus in Book IV, lines 285-388 of Ovid's Metamorphoses. One edition of the bronze cast of it is now in the Museo Soumaya in Mexico City. Another edition of this bronze cast is on display at the Yamasaki Majak Museum of Art in Nagoya, Japan.

His models were two ballerinas at the Paris Opera, recommended to him in the mid-1880s by Edgar Degas. They also served as models for his Psyche, Daphne and Cupid and Cursed Women.

== See also ==
- List of sculptures by Auguste Rodin
