= Danaid (Rodin) =

Sculpture by Auguste Rodin

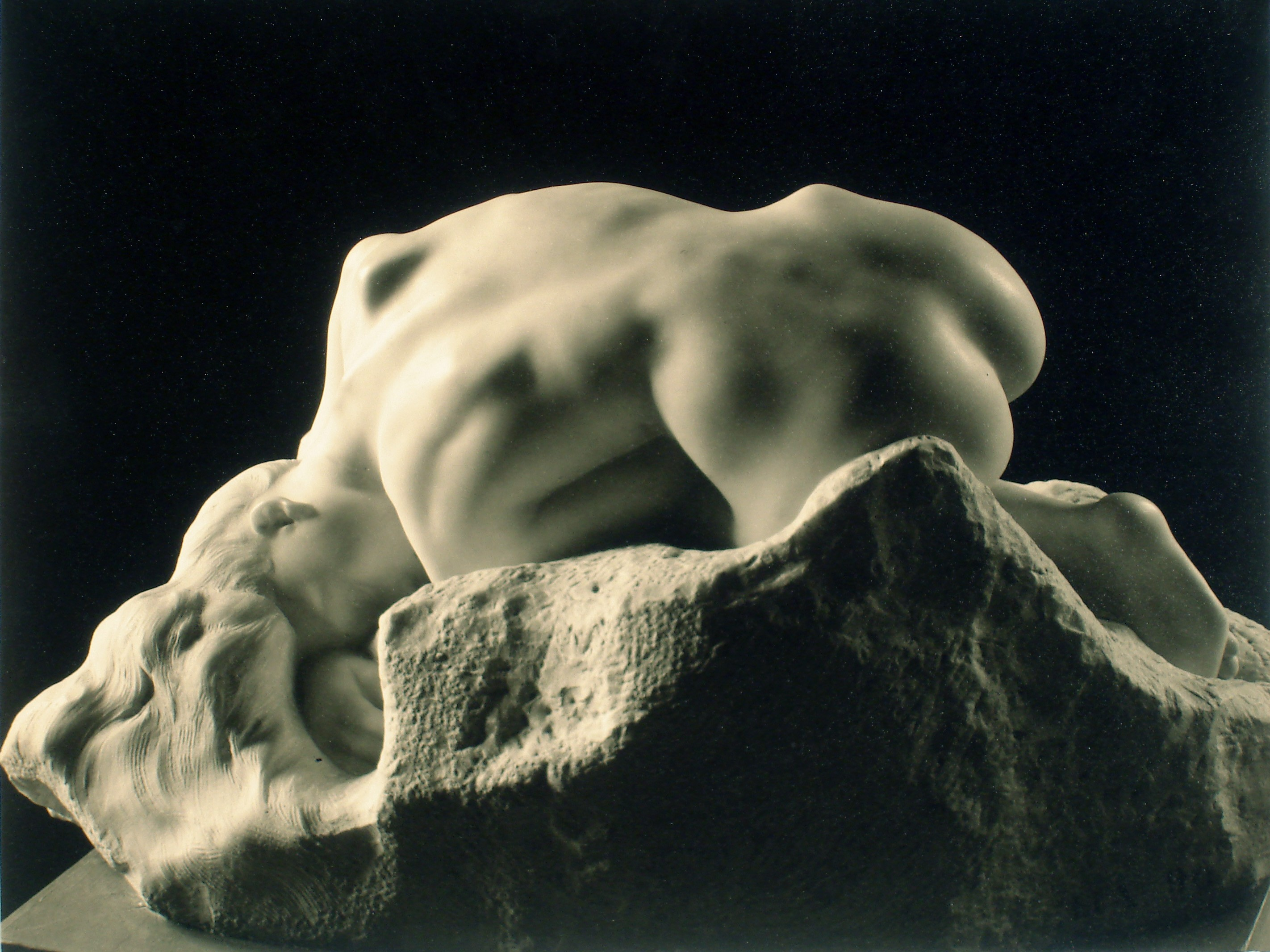
- Artist: Auguste Rodin
- Year: 1889
- Medium: marble (1889), bronze (1891)
- Dimensions: 31.7 cm × 67.2 cm × 44.9 cm (12.5 in × 26.5 in × 17.7 in)
- Location: Museo Nacional de Bellas Artes (Buenos Aires)

Danaid is a sculpture by Auguste Rodin, based on the story of the Danaïdes in Greek myth. It has an alternate name, "The Spring" ("La Source"). The sculpture depicts a woman who has fallen down beside a vessel from which the water is escaping.

== Subject Matter ==
The Danaïdes were fifty sisters, all but one of whom killed their husbands on their wedding night. In a part of the myth sufficiently established for Horace to allude to it (Odes, Book III, 11), they were punished in the afterlife by the endless task of carrying leaky jars of water from a spring to fill a bottomless or leaking barrel.

Rodin's sculpture shows a single Danaid, collapsed from a kneeling position, her hair flowing out over the ground. Beside her is her jar, from which water is flowing.

== History ==
The Danaid was originally conceived in 1885 as part of Rodin's The Gates of Hell but this subject was not included in the final version of that work.

A marble version of the sculpture was presented at the Salon in 1890. It was carved by Jean Escoula, in Rodin's atelier under the artist's supervision. This sculpture is now in the Musée d'Orsay, and other marble sculptures are in the Musée Rodin in Paris, the Rodin Museum in Philadelphia, and the Brooklyn Museum.

Bronze casts of Danaid began to be produced in 1889 and are in collections in France as well as the Museo Soumaya in Mexico City.

A more modern casting can be found in the permanent collection of the Peoria Riverfront Museum, in Peoria, Illinois, US, a gift of preeminent Rodin collector B. Gerald Cantor in honor of Carlotta and Gary Bielfeldt in 1987.

== See also ==
- List of sculptures by Auguste Rodin
