= Nicolaes Molenaer =

Dutch painter

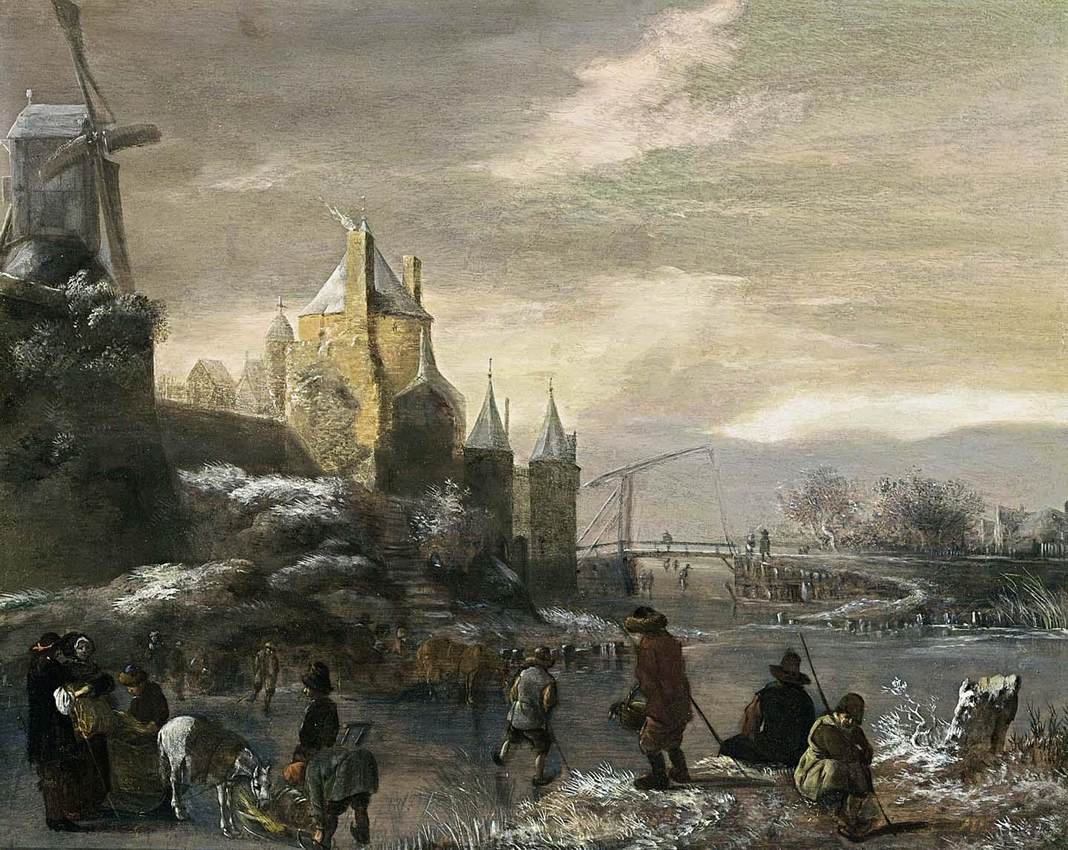
Winter landscape with skaters

Nicolaes (Klaes) Molenaer (1626-1629 in Haarlem – 1676 in Haarlem) was a Dutch Golden Age landscape painter and draughtsman.

== Biography ==
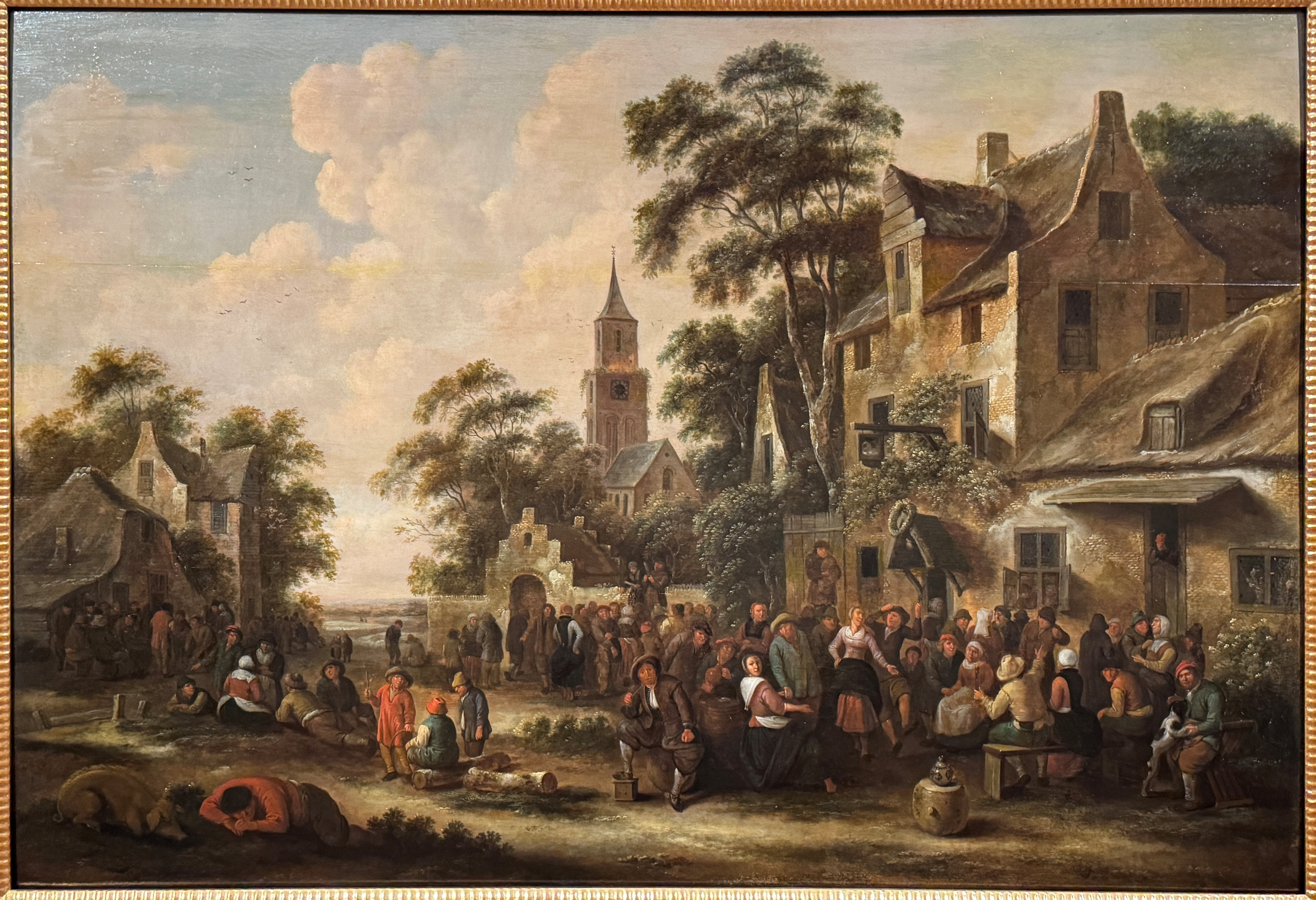
Village festival, 1660/70, Anhaltische Gemäldegalerie Dessau

Molenaer was born and died in Haarlem in the family of tailor Jan Mienssen Molenaer and his second wife Grietgen Adriaens: they would get 8 children of whom no birthdates are known, as the family was Roman Catholic and no baptismal register was kept.

According to the RKD among his brothers there were the painters Bartholomeus and Jan Miense Molenaer. He became a member of the Haarlem Guild of St. Luke in 1651 and paid dues yearly until 1676. He was a winter landscape painter influenced by Jacob van Ruisdael.
