= Sculpture in the Indian subcontinent =

Sculpture in the Indian subcontinent

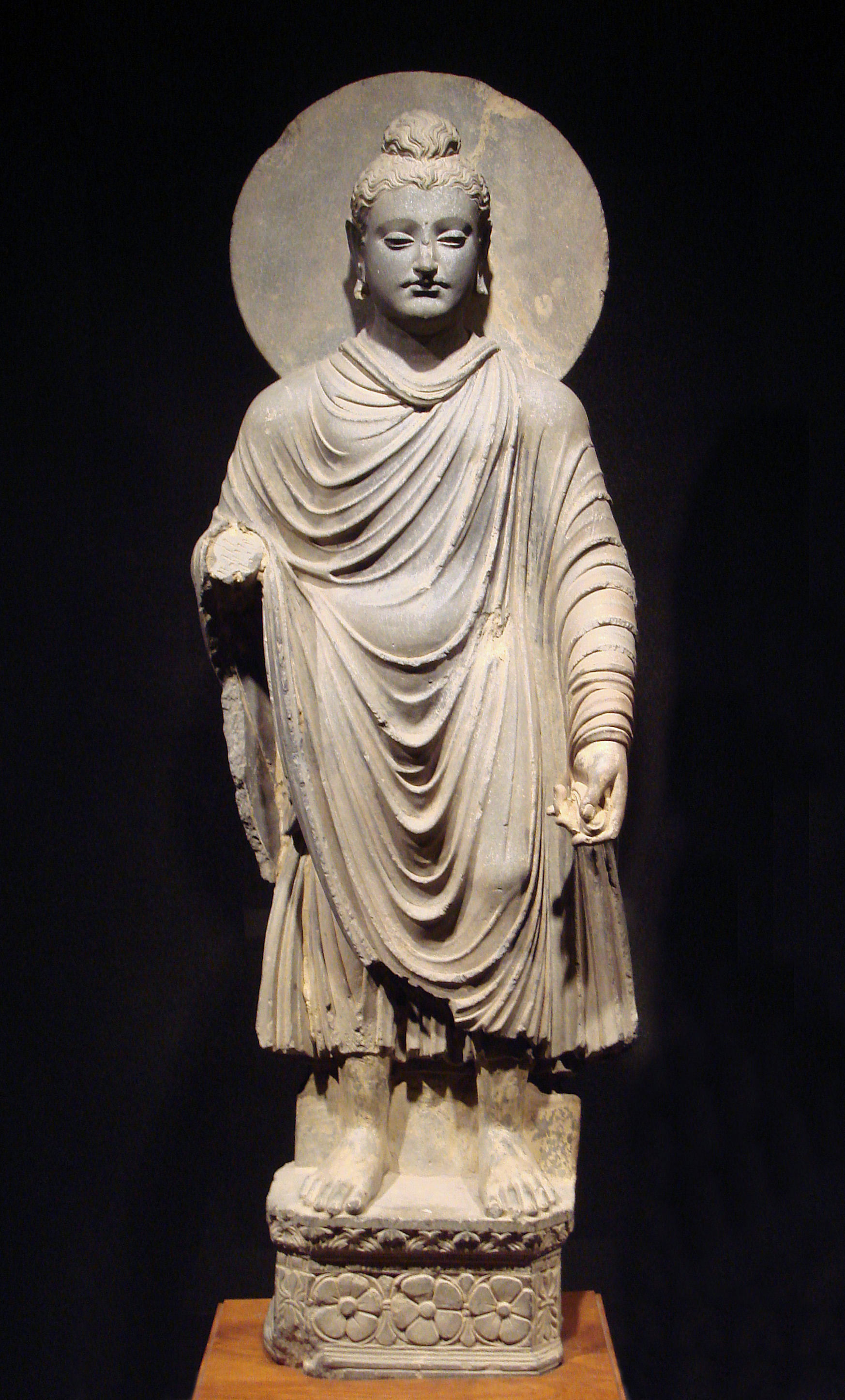
One of the first representations of the Buddha, 1st–2nd century CE, Gandhara

Sculpture in the Indian subcontinent, partly because the climate of the Indian subcontinent makes the long-term survival of organic materials difficult, essentially consists of sculpture of stone, metal, or terracotta. It is clear there was a great deal of painting, and sculpture in wood and ivory, during these periods, but there are only a few survivals. The main Indian religions had all, after hesitant starts, developed the use of religious sculpture by around the start of the Common Era, and the use of stone was becoming increasingly widespread.

The first known sculpture in the Indian subcontinent is from the Indus Valley Civilisation, and a more widespread tradition of small terracotta figures, mostly either of women or animals, which predates it. After the collapse of the Indus Valley civilization, there is little record of larger sculpture until the Buddhist era, apart from a hoard of copper figures of (somewhat controversially) c. 1500 BCE from Daimabad. Thus the great tradition of Indian monumental sculpture in stone appears to begin relatively late, with the reign of Asoka from 270 to 232 BCE, and the Pillars of Ashoka he erected around India, carrying his edicts and topped by famous sculptures of animals, mostly lions, of which six survive. Large amounts of figurative sculpture, mostly in relief, survive from Early Buddhist pilgrimage stupas, above all Sanchi; these probably developed out of a tradition using wood that also embraced Hinduism.

During the 2nd to 1st century BCE in far northern India, in the Greco-Buddhist art of Gandhara from what is now southern Afghanistan and northern Pakistan, sculptures became more explicit, representing episodes of the Buddha's life and teachings.

The pink sandstone Jain and Buddhist sculptures of Mathura from the 1st to 3rd centuries CE reflected both native Indian traditions and the Western influences received through the Greco-Buddhist art of Gandhara, and effectively established the basis for subsequent Indian religious sculpture. The style was developed and diffused through most of India under the Gupta Empire (c. 320–550), which remains a "classical" period for Indian sculpture, covering the earlier Ellora Caves, though the Elephanta Caves are probably slightly later. Later large scale sculpture remains almost exclusively religious, and generally rather conservative, often reverting to simple frontal standing poses for deities, though the attendant spirits such as apsaras and yakshi often have sensuously curving poses. Carving is often highly detailed, with an intricate backing behind the main figure in high relief. The celebrated bronzes of the Chola dynasty (c. 848–1279) from south India, many designed to be carried in processions, include the iconic form of Shiva as Nataraja, with the massive granite carvings of Mahabalipuram dating from the previous Pallava dynasty.

== Bronze Age sculpture ==
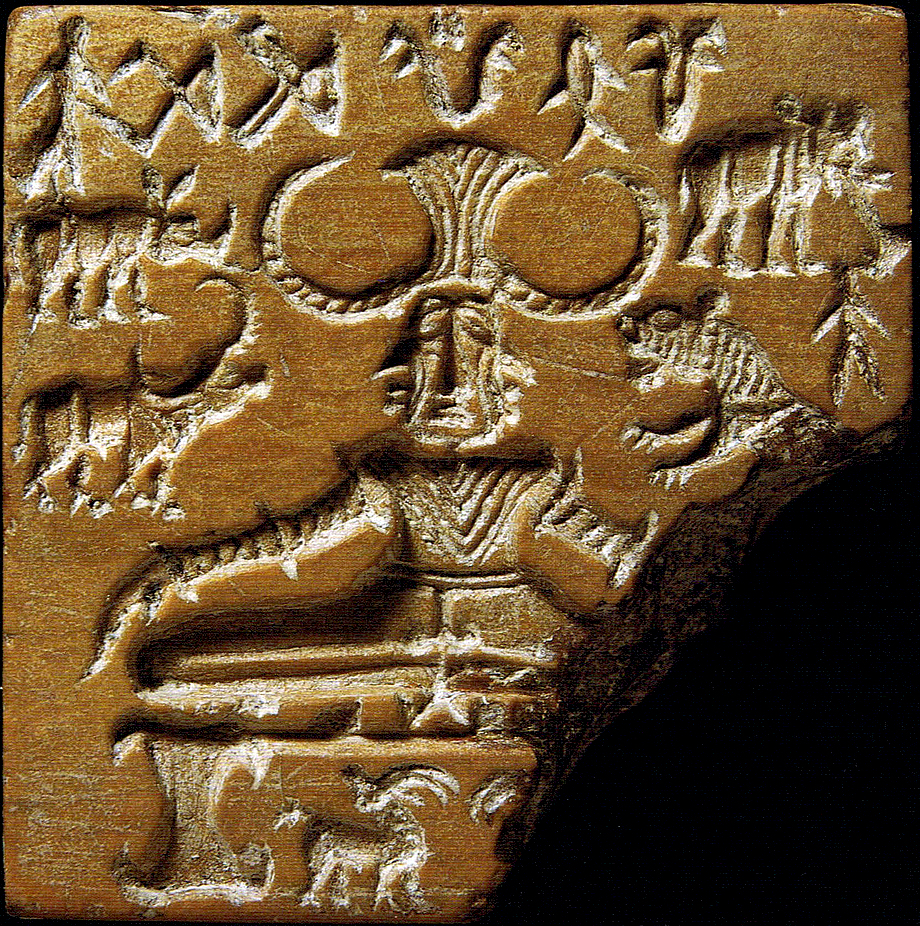
The Pashupati seal, showing a seated figure surrounded by animals

The first known sculpture in the Indian subcontinent is from the Indus Valley Civilisation (3300–1300 BCE). These include the famous small bronze Dancing Girl. However, such figures in bronze and stone are rare and greatly outnumbered by pottery figurines and stone seals, often of animals or deities very finely depicted and crafted.

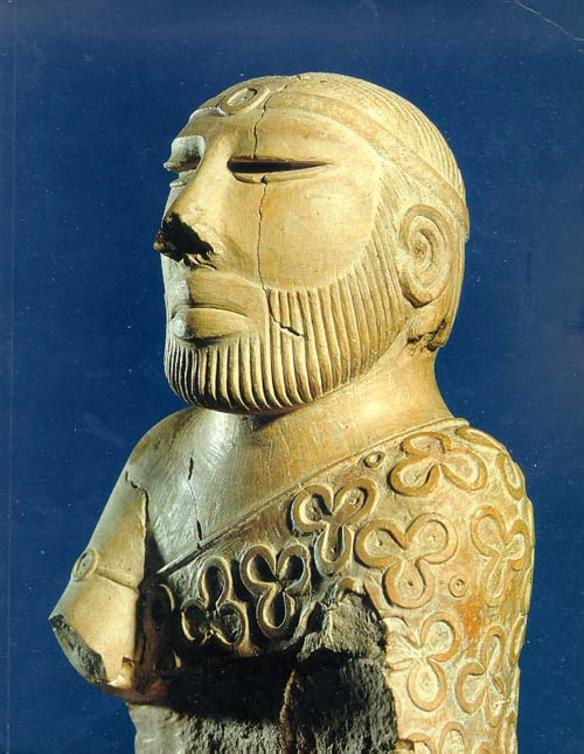
The Priest-King, Mohenjo-daro

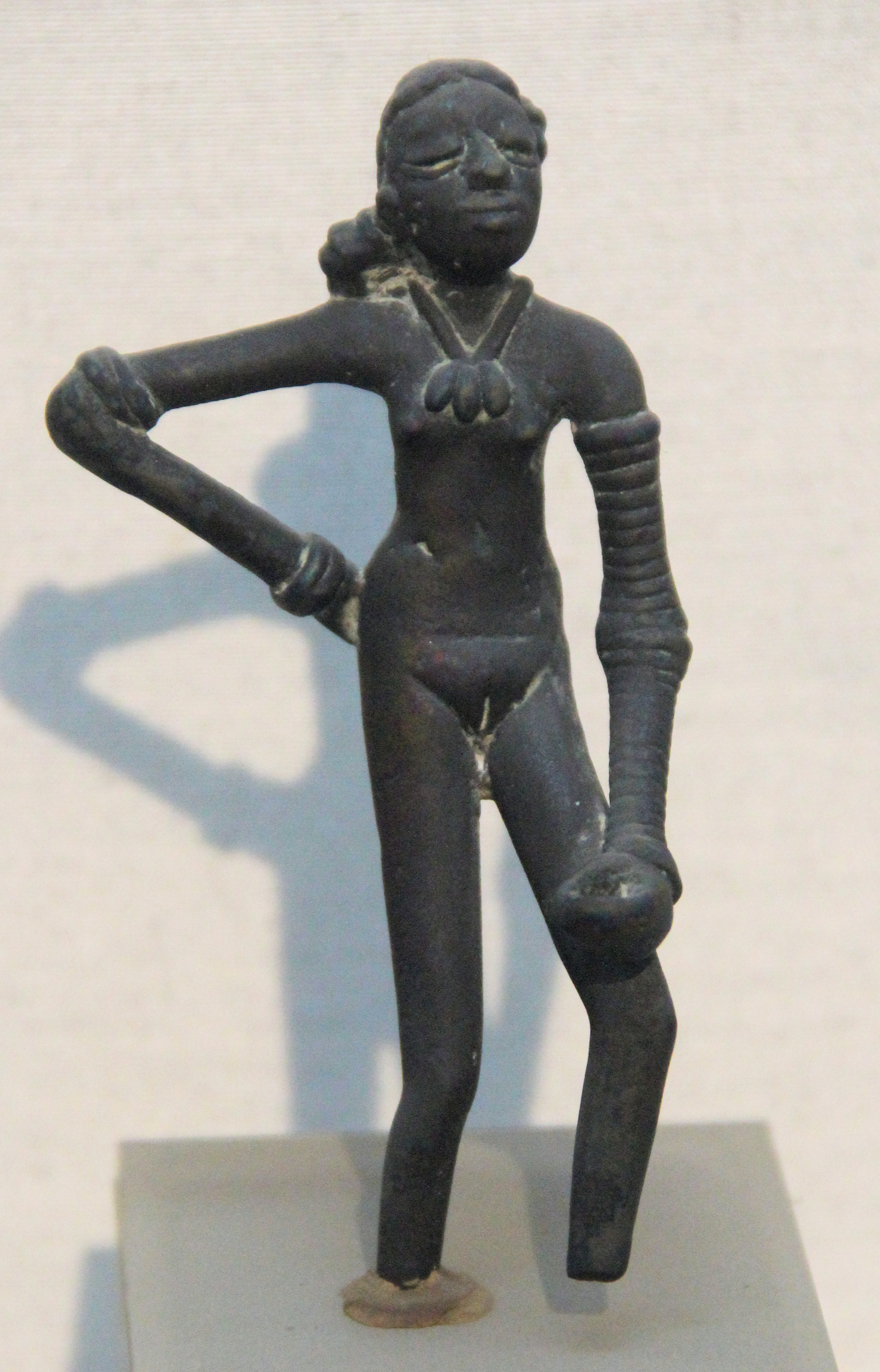
Dancing Girl, Mohenjo-daro

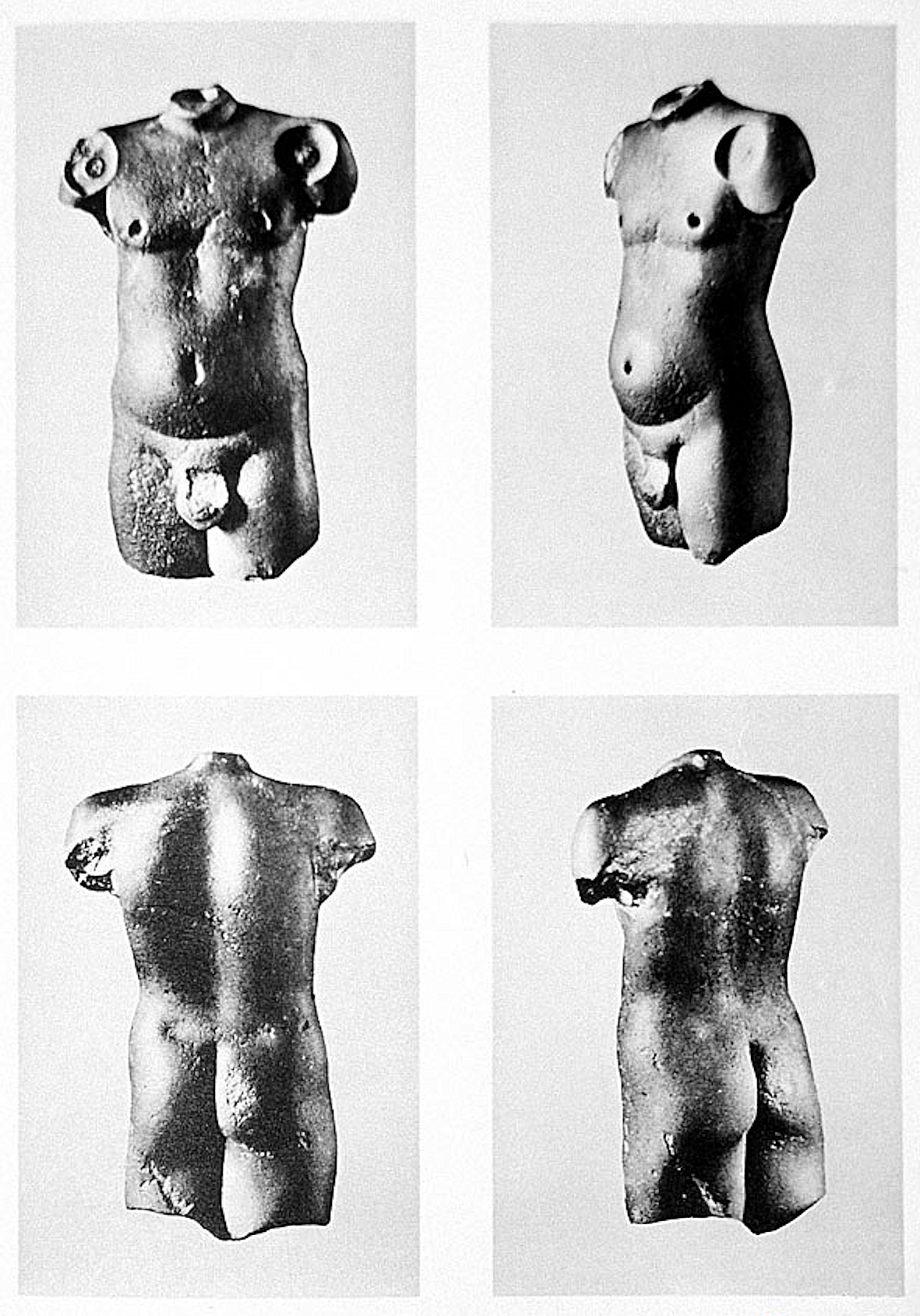
Harappan jasper torso

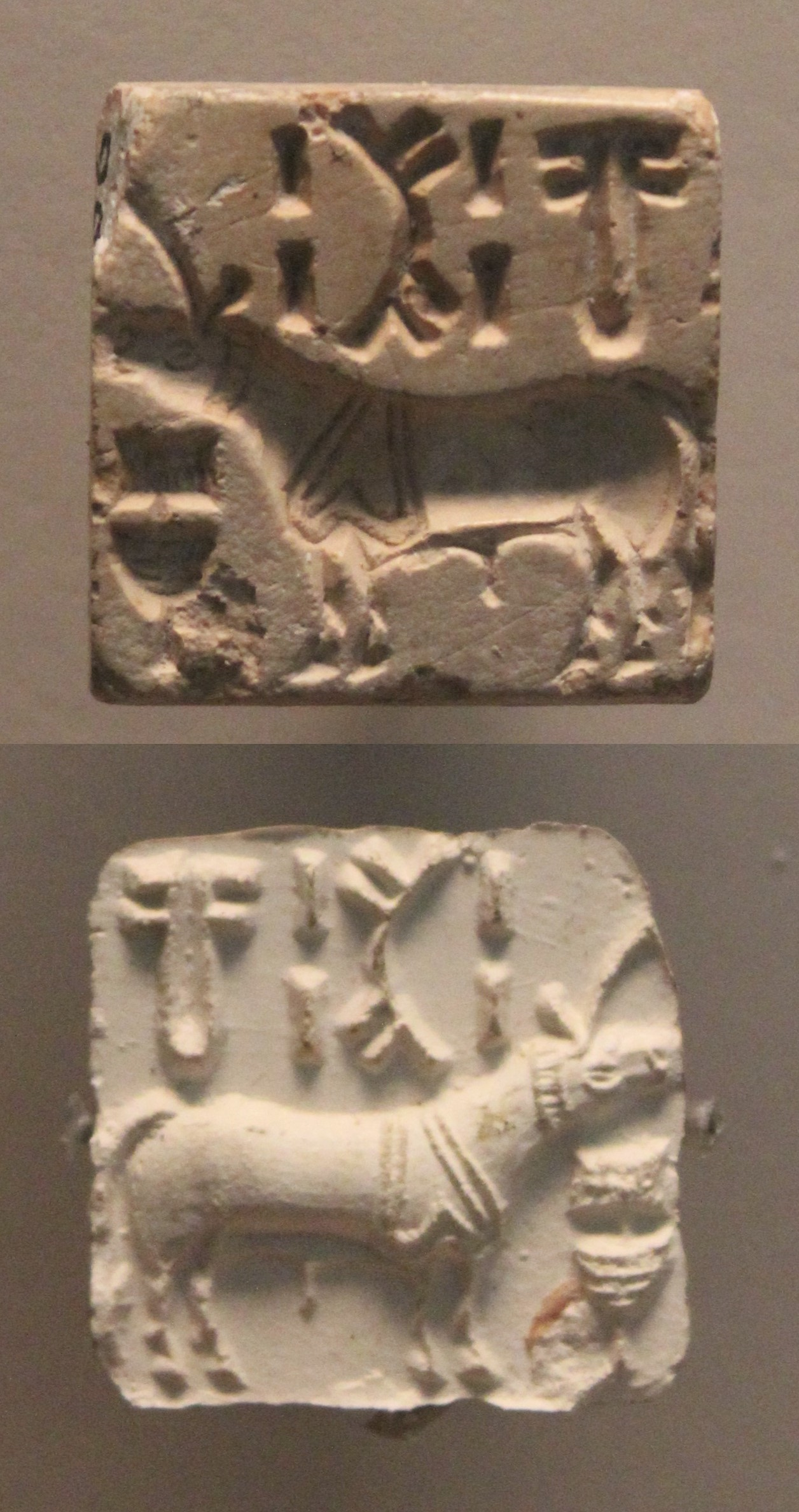
Indus Valley seal and impression of "unicorn"

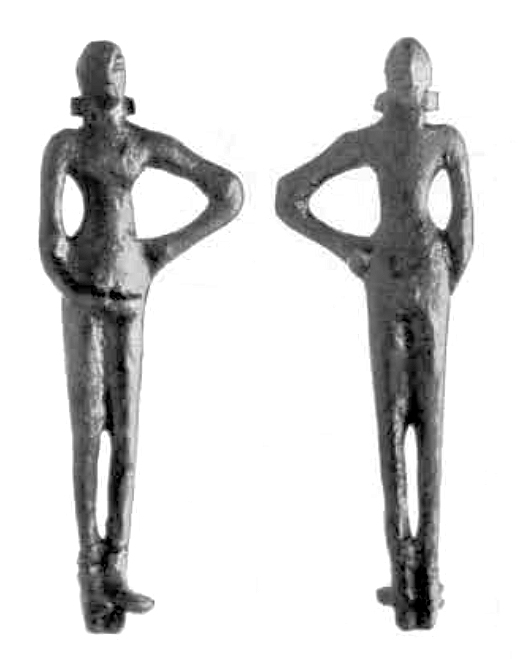
The second Dancing Girl bronze figure

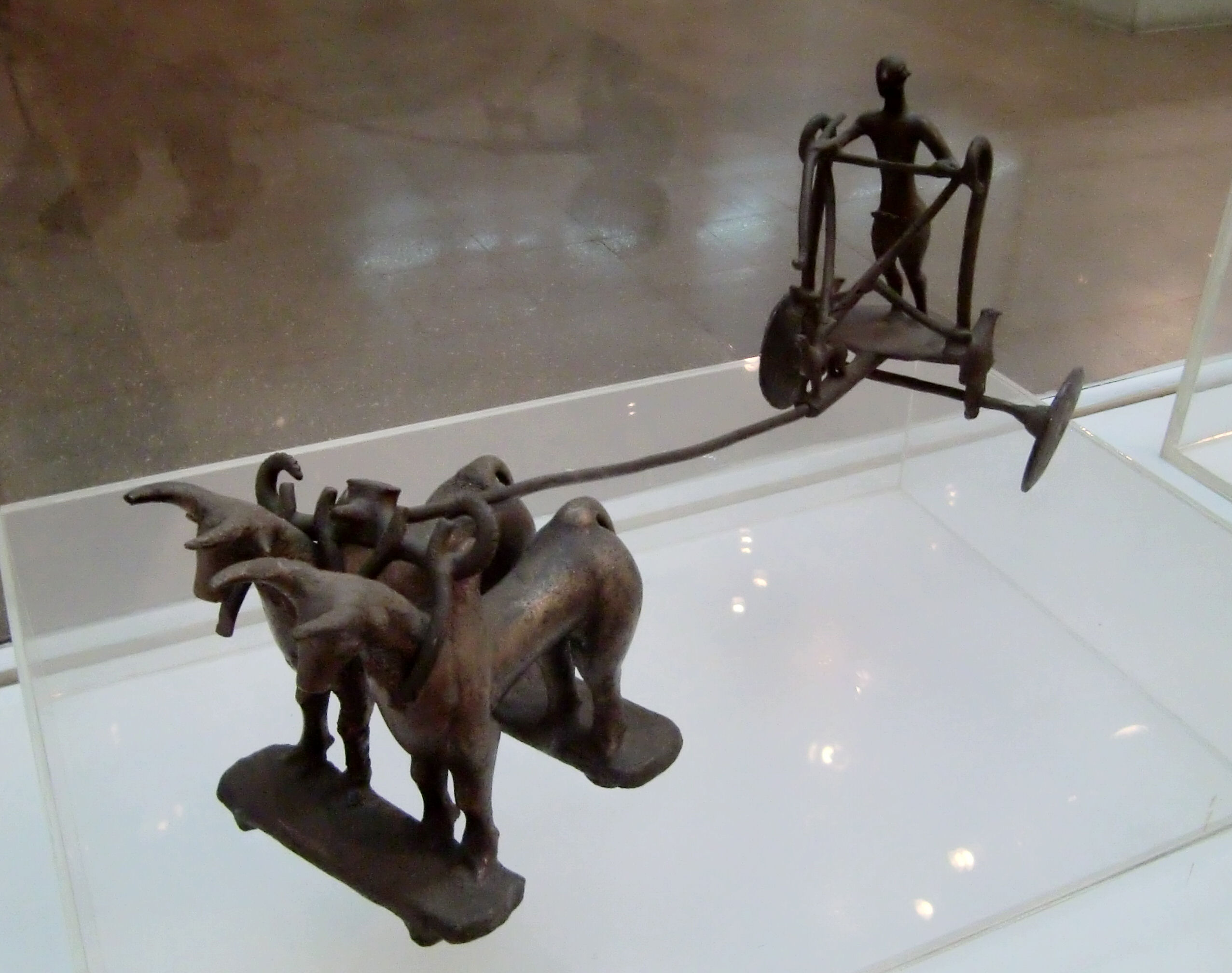
Daimabad Chariot

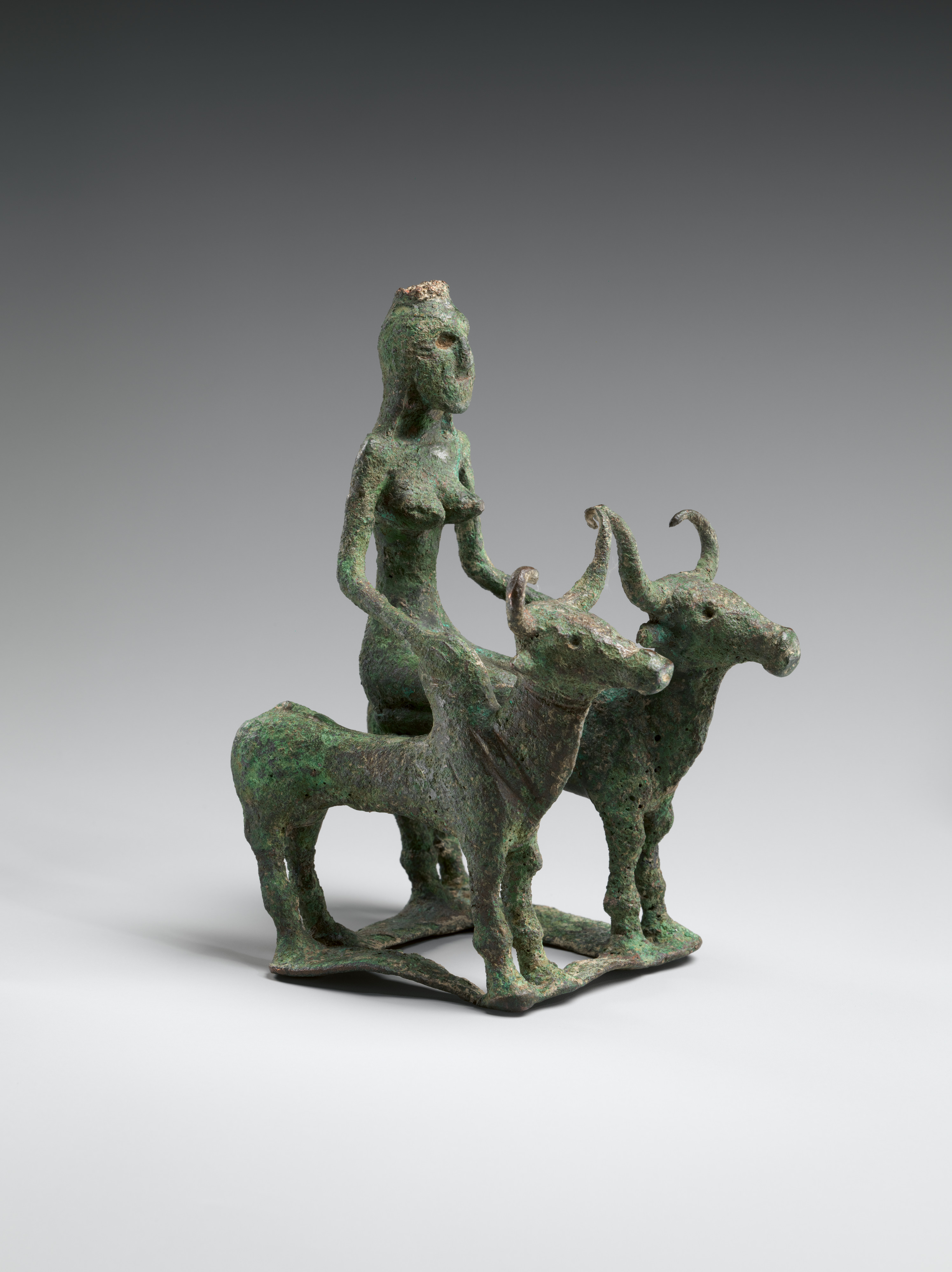
Woman riding two bulls (bronze), from Kausambi, c. 2000-1750 BCE

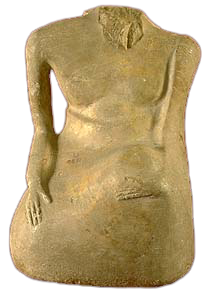
Seated male sculpture from Mohenjo-daro

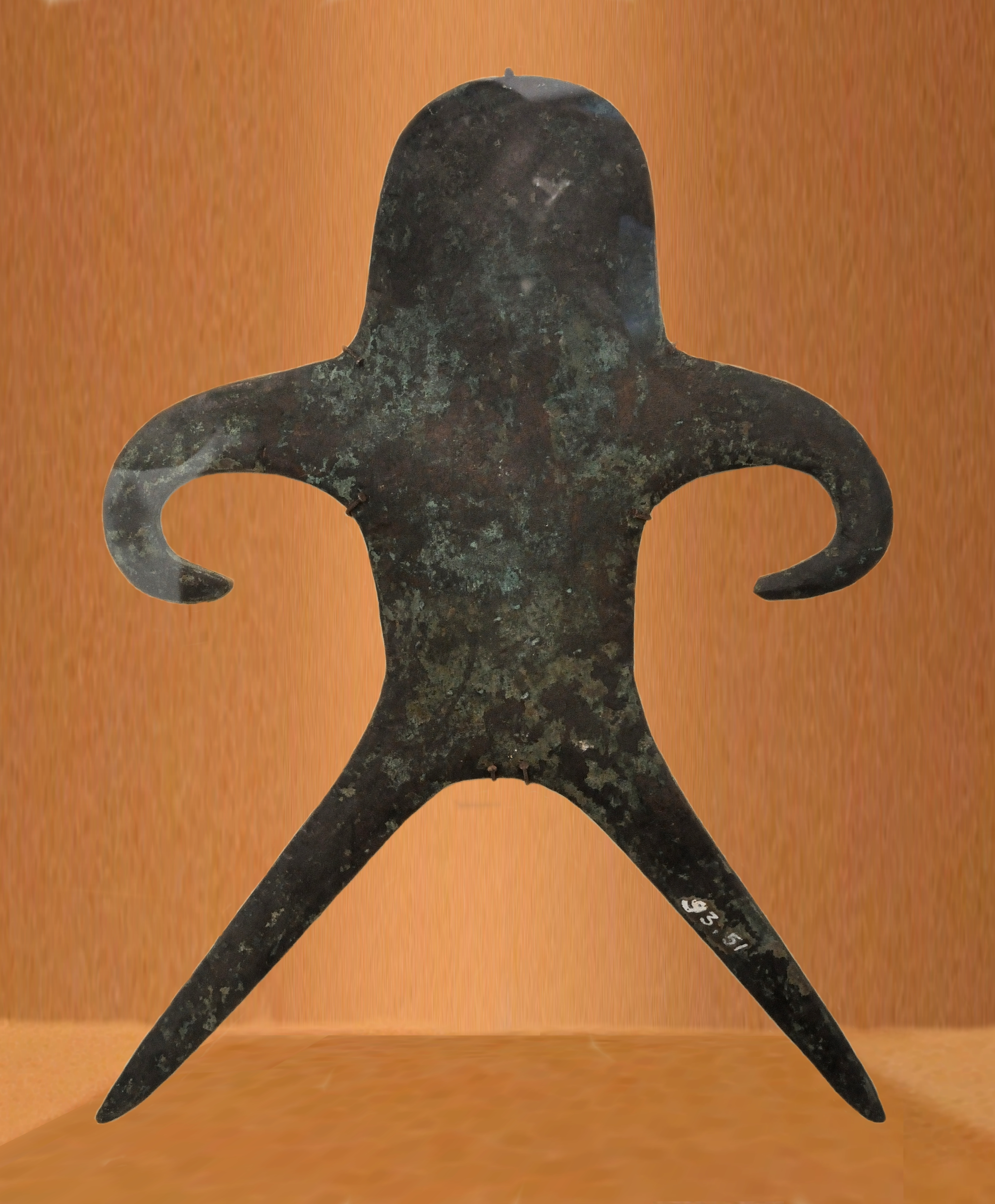
Morphological artefact. Copper Hoard culture (2nd millennium BCE). Mathura Museum.

Some very early depictions of deities seem to appear in the art of the Indus Valley Civilisation (3300 BCE - 1300 BCE), but the following millennium, coinciding with the Vedic period, is devoid of such remains. It has been suggested that the early Vedic religion focused exclusively on the worship of purely "elementary forces of nature by means of elaborate sacrifices", which did not lend themselves easily to anthropomorphological representations.

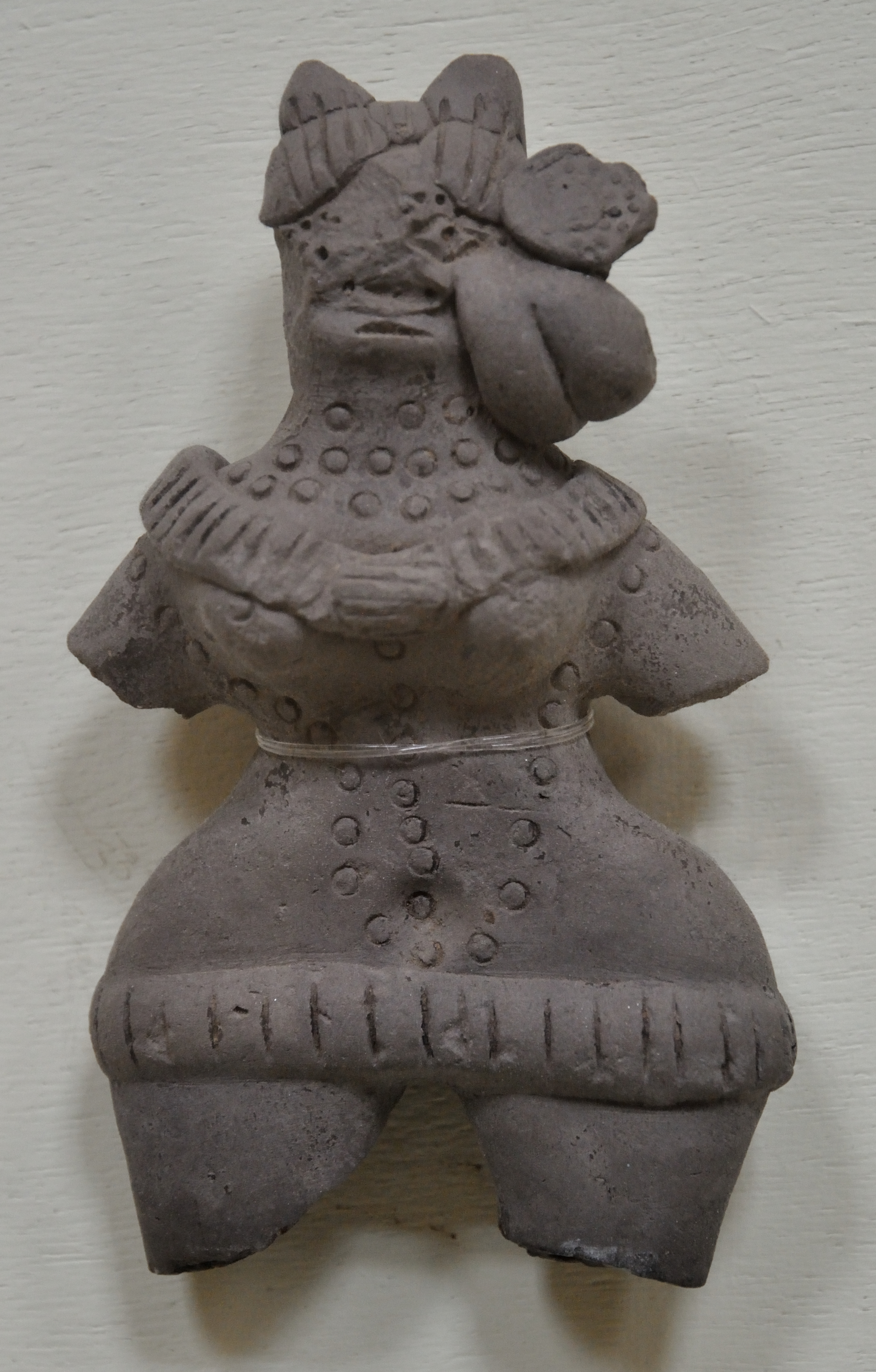
Terracotta figurine, Mathura, 4th century BCE

Various artefacts may belong to the Copper Hoard culture (2nd millennium BCE), some of them suggesting anthropomorphological characteristics. Interpretations vary as to the exact signification of these artifacts, or even the culture and the periodization to which they belonged. Some examples of artistic expression also appear in abstract pottery designs during the Black and red ware culture (1450-1200 BCE) or the Painted Grey Ware culture (1200-600 BCE), with finds in a wide area.

Most of the early finds following this period correspond to what is called the "second period of urbanization" in the middle of the 1st millennium BCE, after a gap of about a thousand years following the collapse of the Indus Valley Civilisation. The anthropomorphic depiction of various deities apparently started in the middle of the 1st millennium BCE, possibly as a consequence of the influx of foreign stimuli initiated with the Achaemenid conquest of the Indus Valley and the rise of alternative local faiths challenging Vedism, such as Buddhism and Jainism and local popular cults. Some rudimentary terracotta artifacts may date to this period, just before the Mauryan era.

== Art of the Mauryan period ==
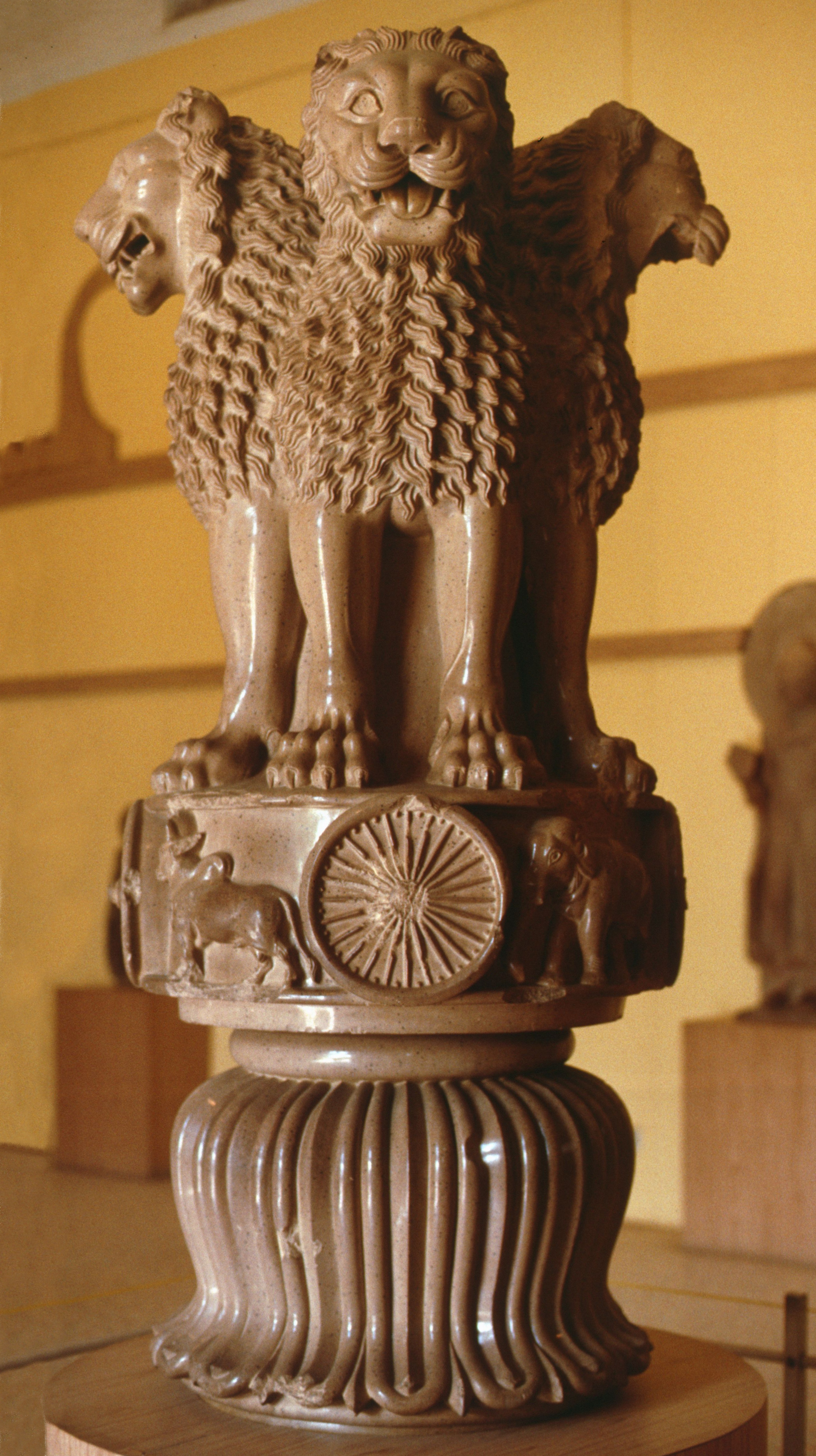
The Lion Capital of Asoka, the National Emblem of India, the most famous example of Mauryan art

The surviving art of the Mauryan Empire, which ruled, at least in theory, over most of the Indian subcontinent between 322 and 185 BCE, is mostly sculpture. There was an imperial court-sponsored art patronized by the emperors, especially Ashoka, and then a "popular" style produced by all others.

The most significant remains of monumental Mauryan art include the remains of the royal palace and the city of Pataliputra, a monolithic rail at Sarnath, the Bodhimandala or the altar resting on four pillars at Bodhgaya, the rock-cut chaitya-halls in the Barabar Caves near Gaya, the non-edict bearing and edict bearing pillars, the animal sculptures crowning the pillars with animal and botanical reliefs decorating the abaci of the capitals and the front half of the representation of an elephant carved out in the round from a live rock at Dhauli.

This period marked the appearance of Indian stone sculpture; much previous sculpture was probably in wood and has not survived. The elaborately carved animal capitals surviving from some Pillars of Ashoka are the best-known works, and among the finest, above all the Lion Capital of Ashoka from Sarnath that is now the National Emblem of India. Coomaraswamy distinguishes between court art and a more popular art during the Mauryan period. Court art is represented by the pillars and their capitals, and surviving popular art by some stone pieces, and many smaller works in terracotta.

The highly polished surface of court sculpture is often called Mauryan polish. However, this seems not to be entirely reliable as a diagnostic tool for a Mauryan date, as some works from considerably later periods also have it. The Didarganj Yakshi, now most often thought to be from the 2nd century CE, is an example.

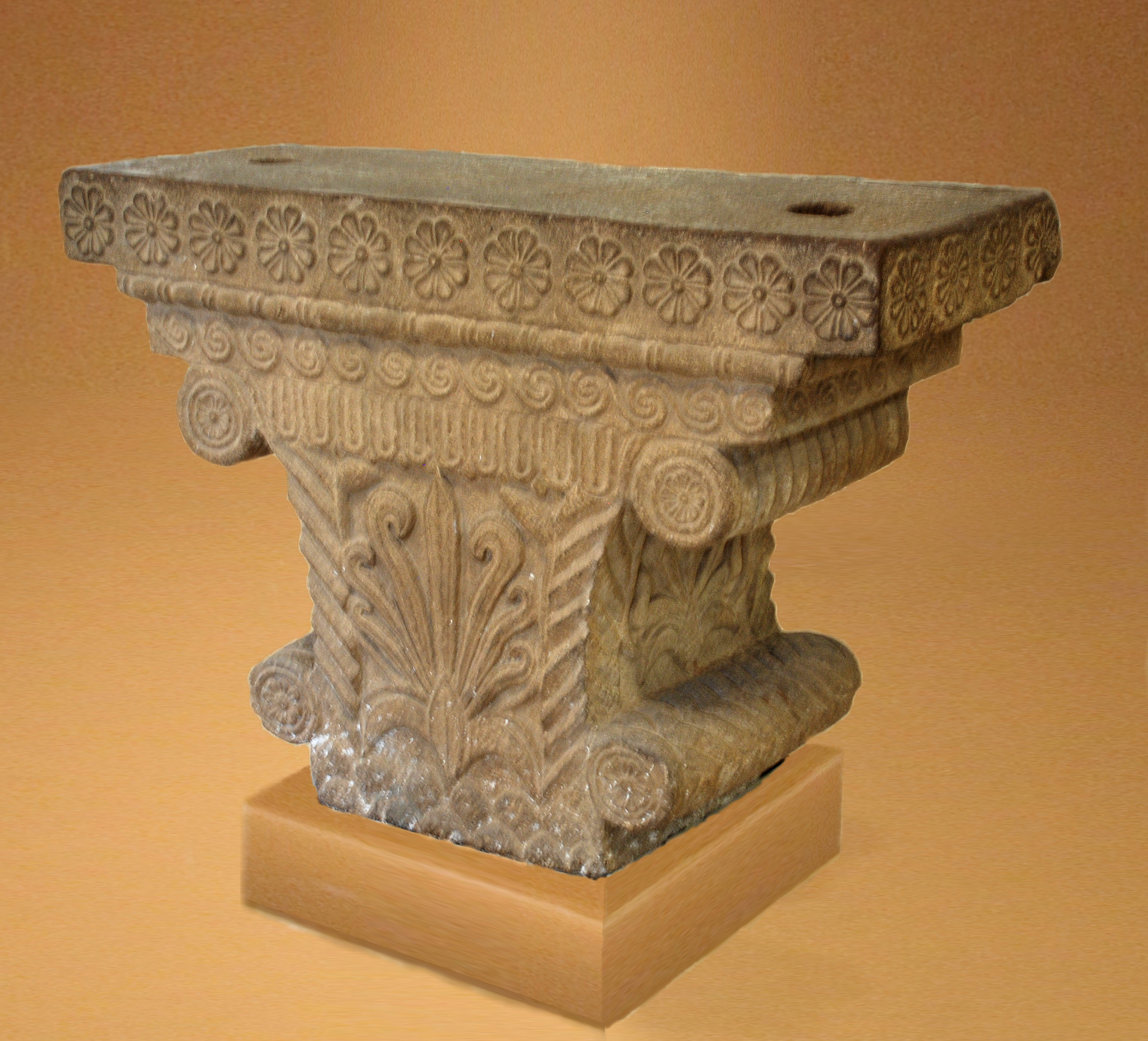
The Pataliputra capital, showing both Achaemenid and Greek influence, with volute, bead and reel, meander, and honeysuckle designs. Early Mauryan period, 4th-3rd century BC.

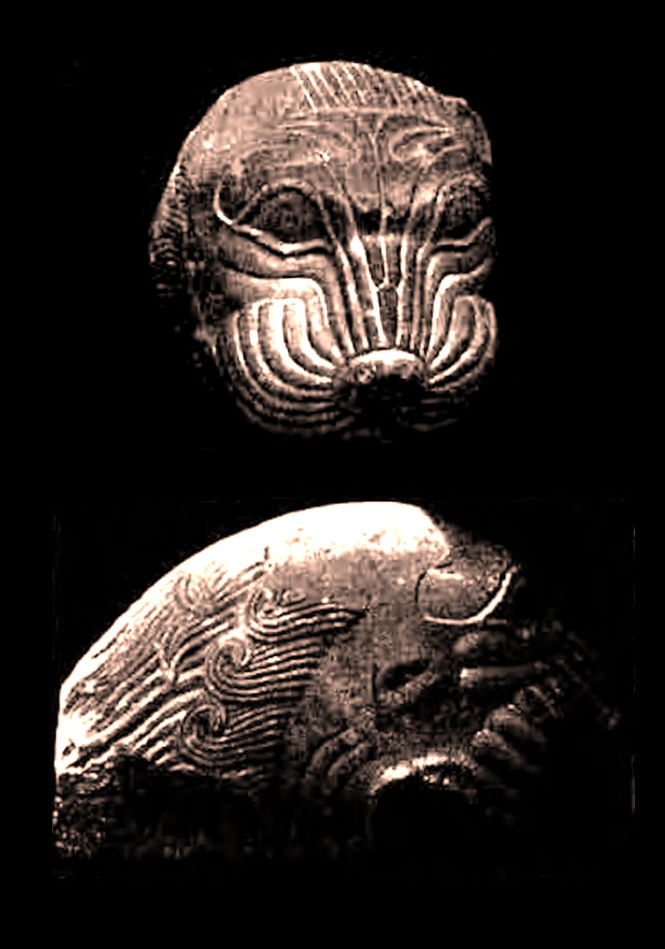
Masarh lion sculpture

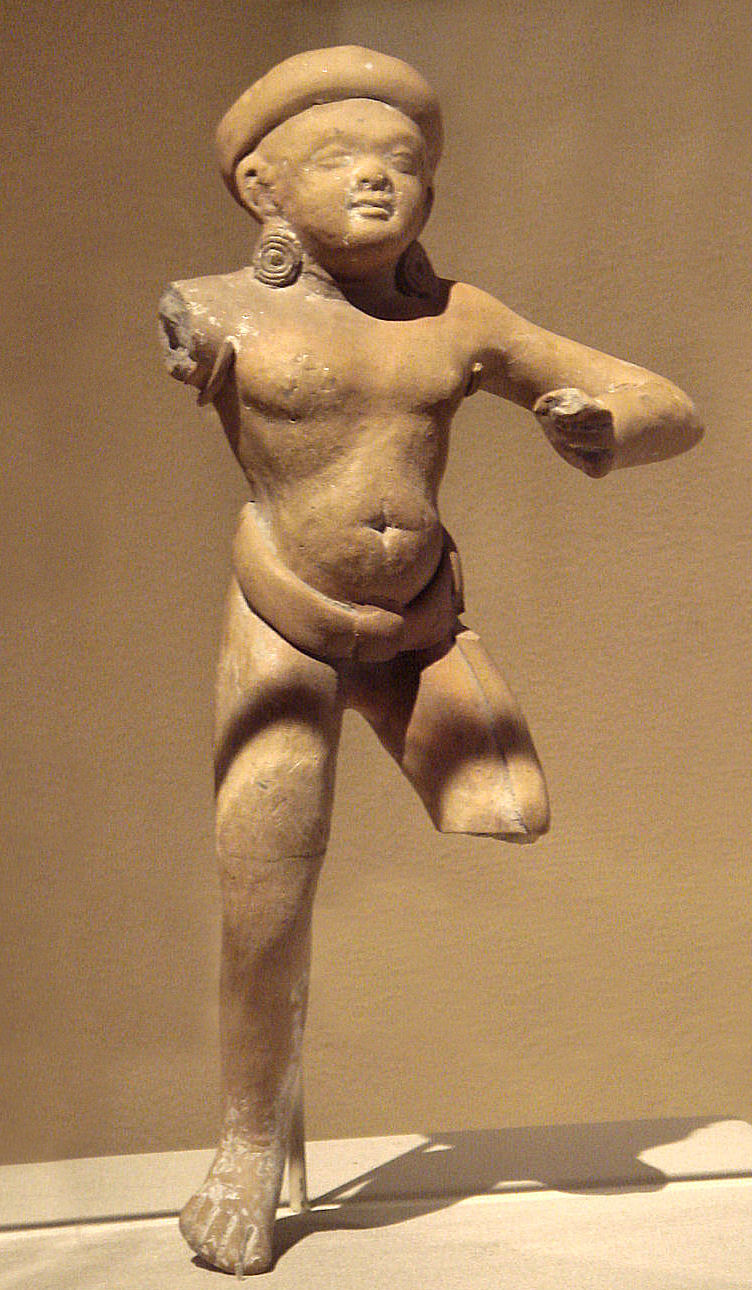
Mauryan statue, 3rd-2nd century BCE

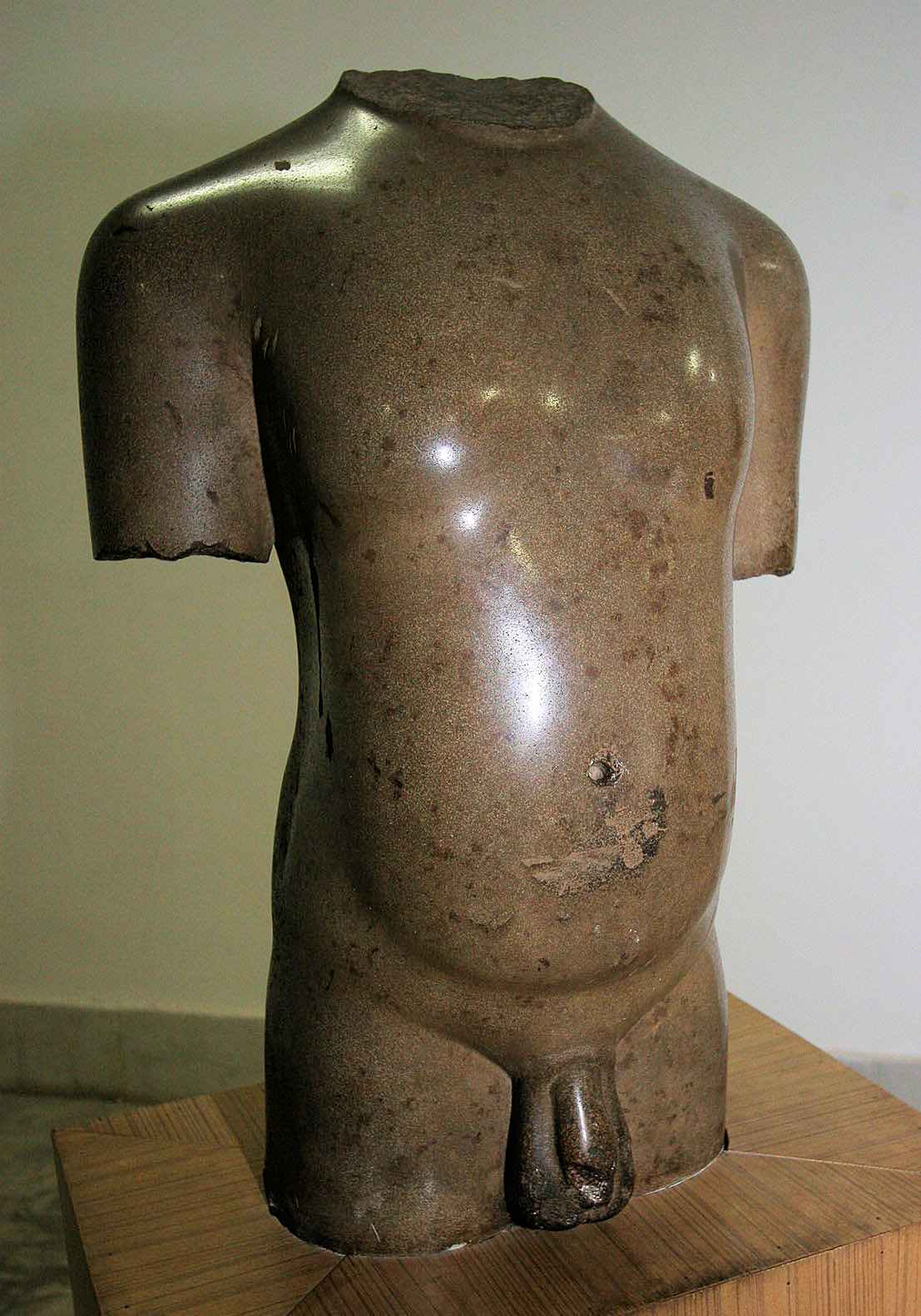
Lohanipur torso

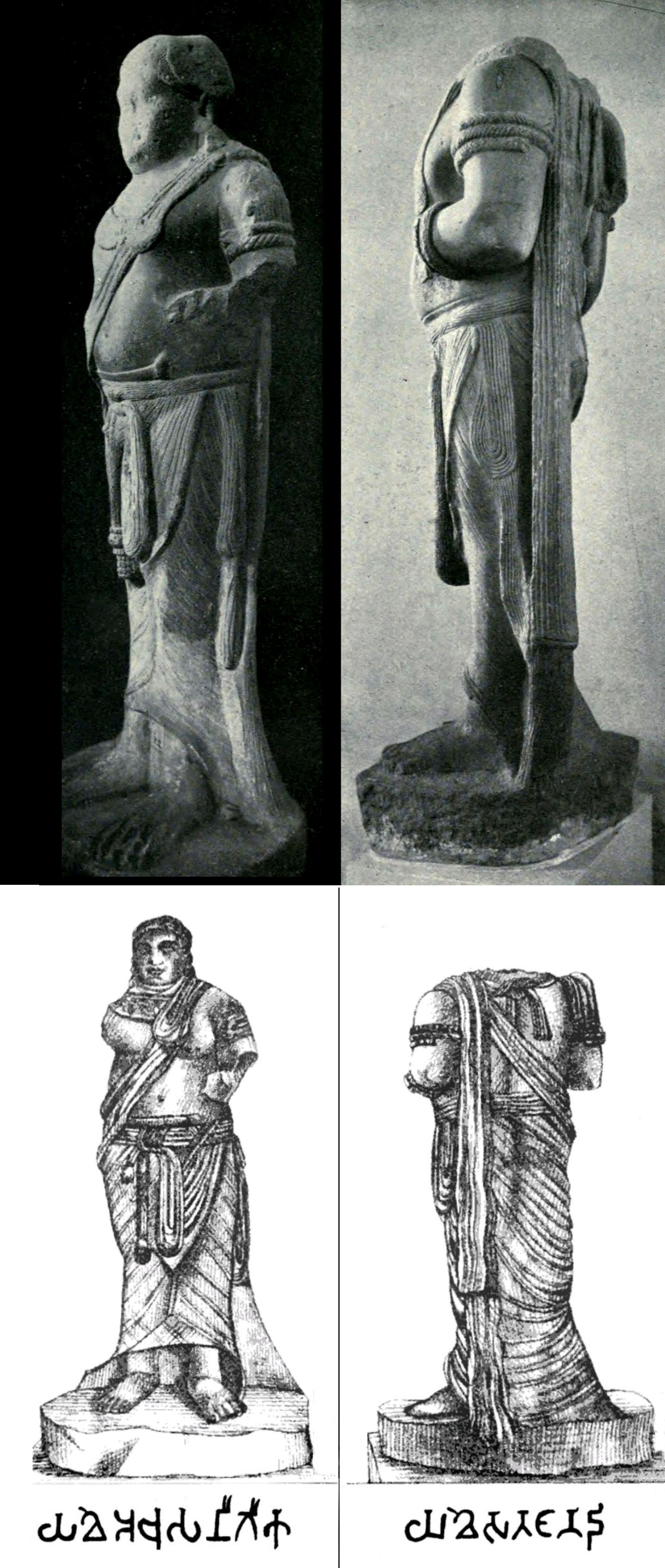
Yaksha statue

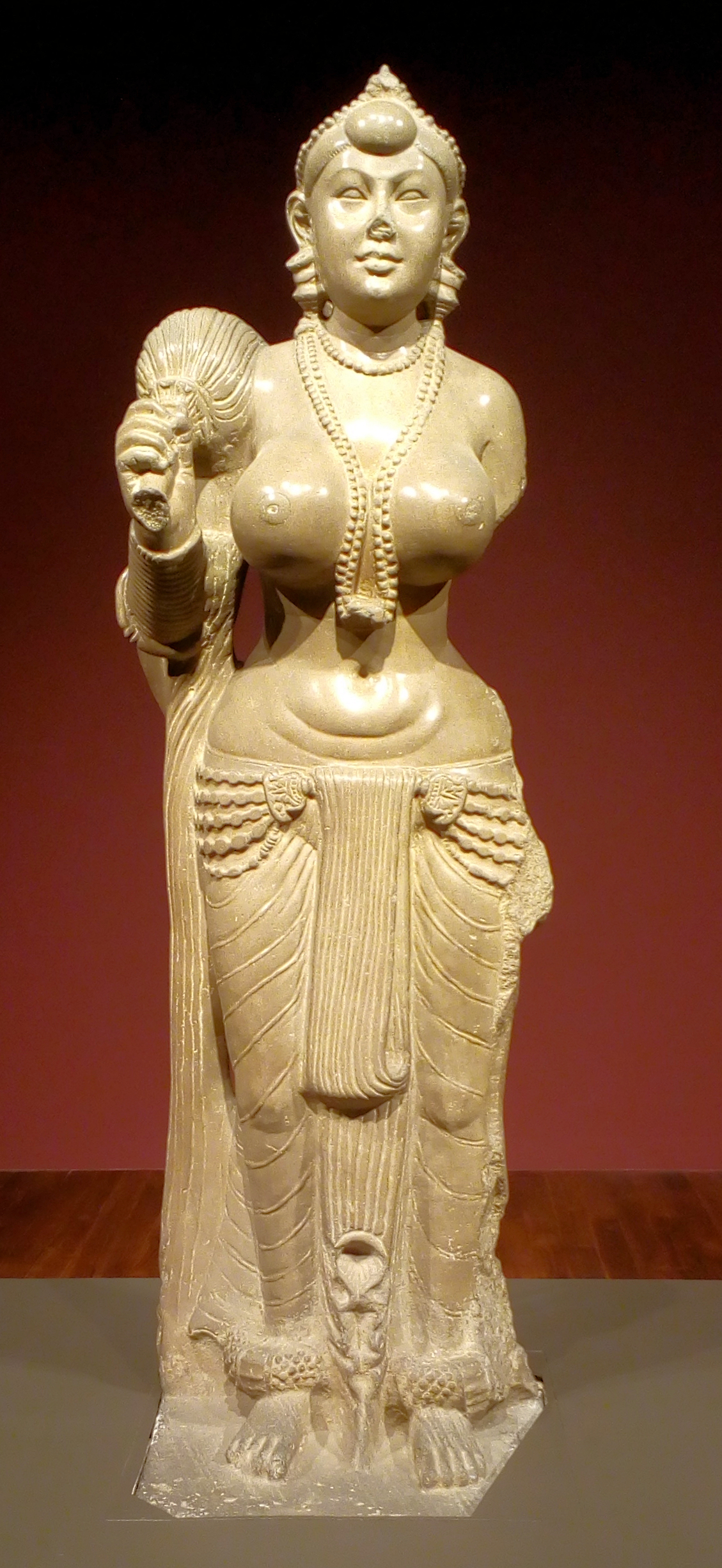
Didarganj Yakshi with fly-whisk (chauri) is held in the right hand, whereas the left hand is broken, in the Bihar Museum

== Art of the Shunga period ==
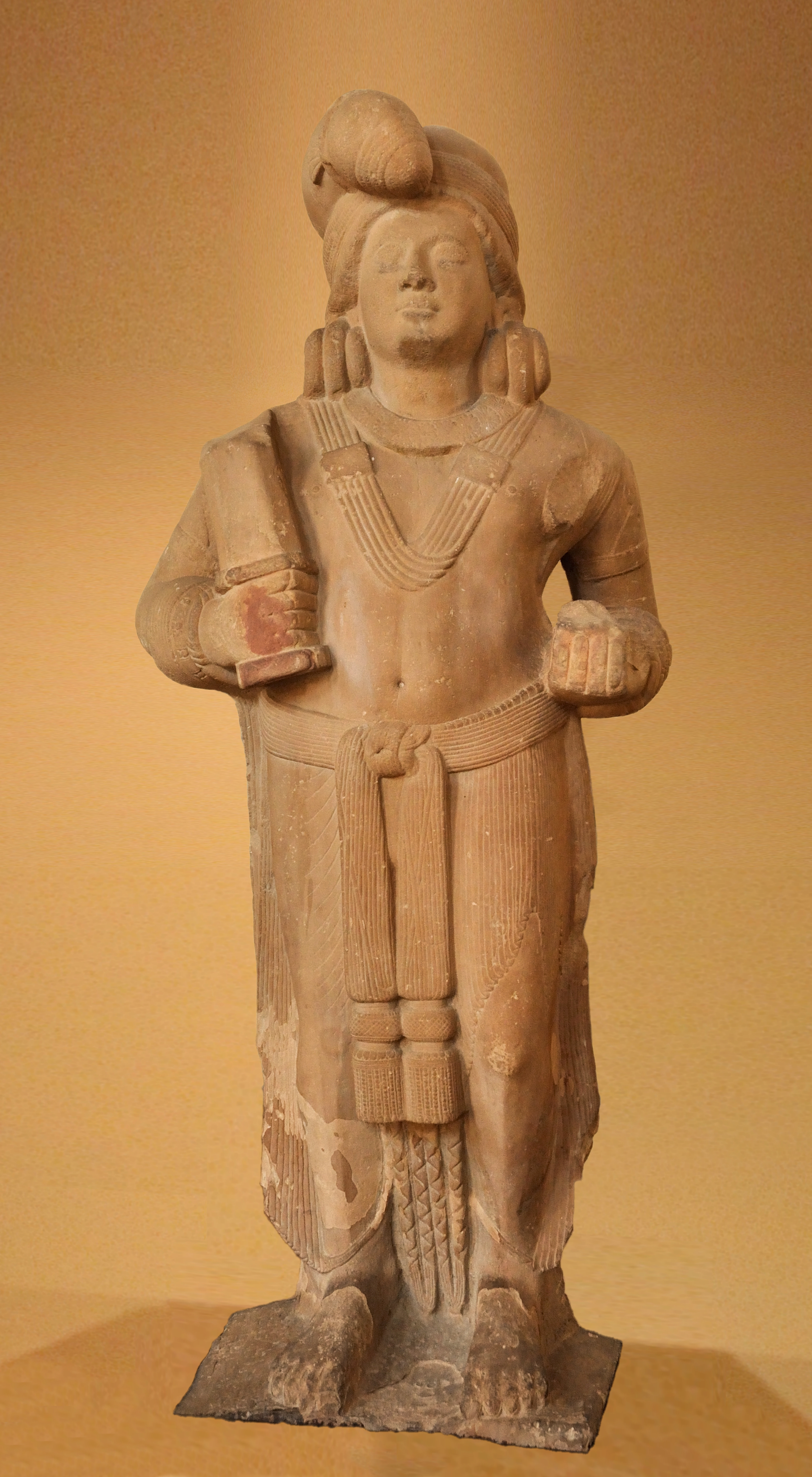
Mudgarpani ("Mace-holder") Yaksha from Bharana Kalan, northwest of Mathura. Art of Mathura, 100 BCE. This colossal statue in the round is 1.96 meters tall. Mathura Museum, GMM 87.145

Terracotta arts executed during the pre-Mauryan and Mauryan periods are further refined during Shunga periods. Chandraketugarh emerge as an important center for the terracotta arts of Shunga period. Mathura which has its basis in the pre-Mauryan period also emerges as an important center for Jain, Hindu and Buddhist art.

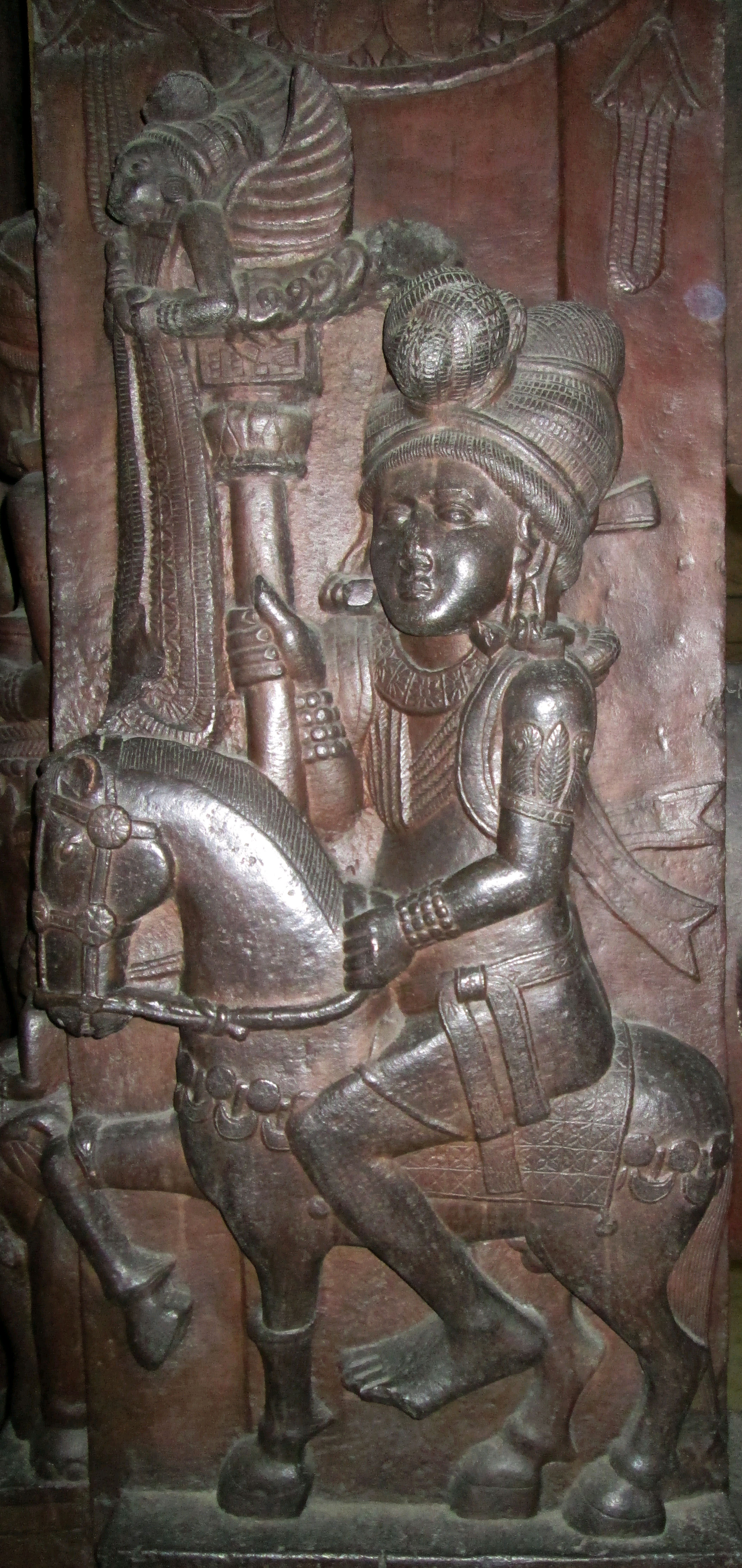
Bharhut stupa, Shunga horseman

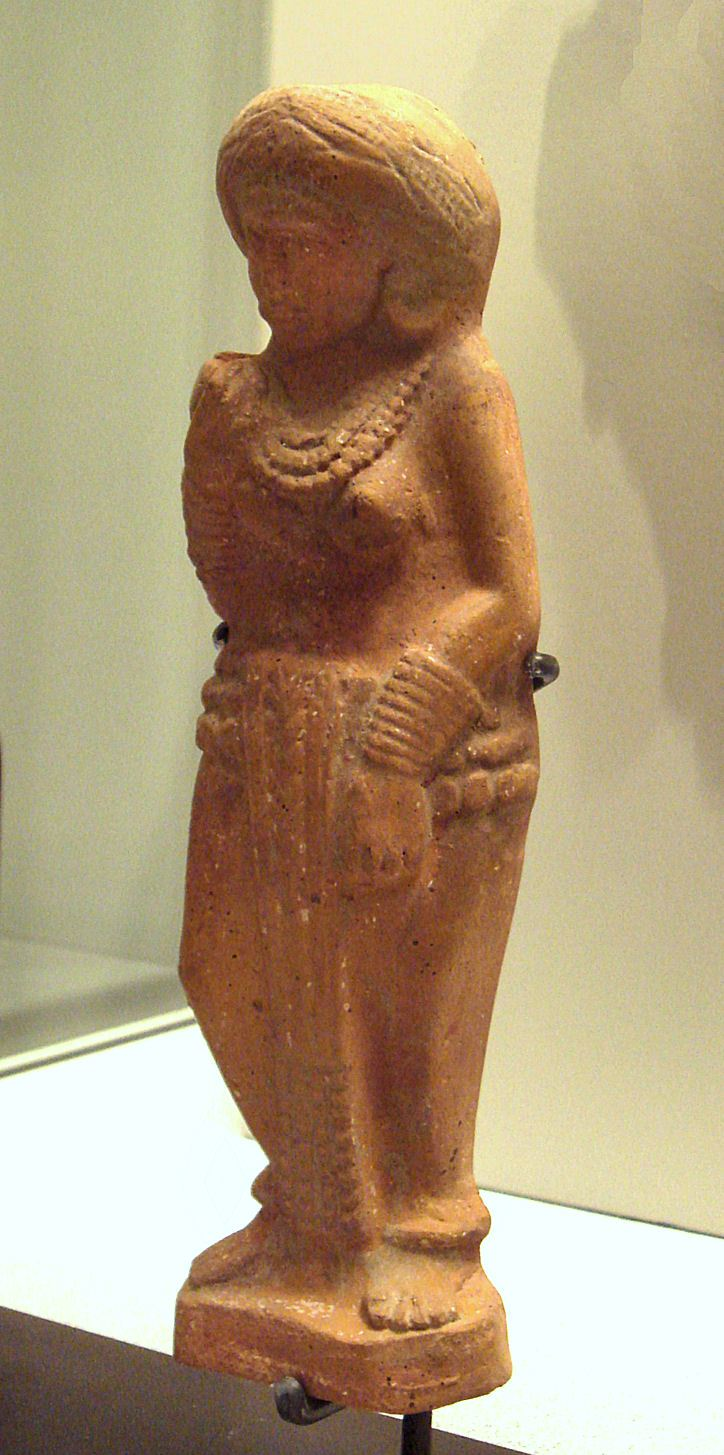
Shunga Yakshi

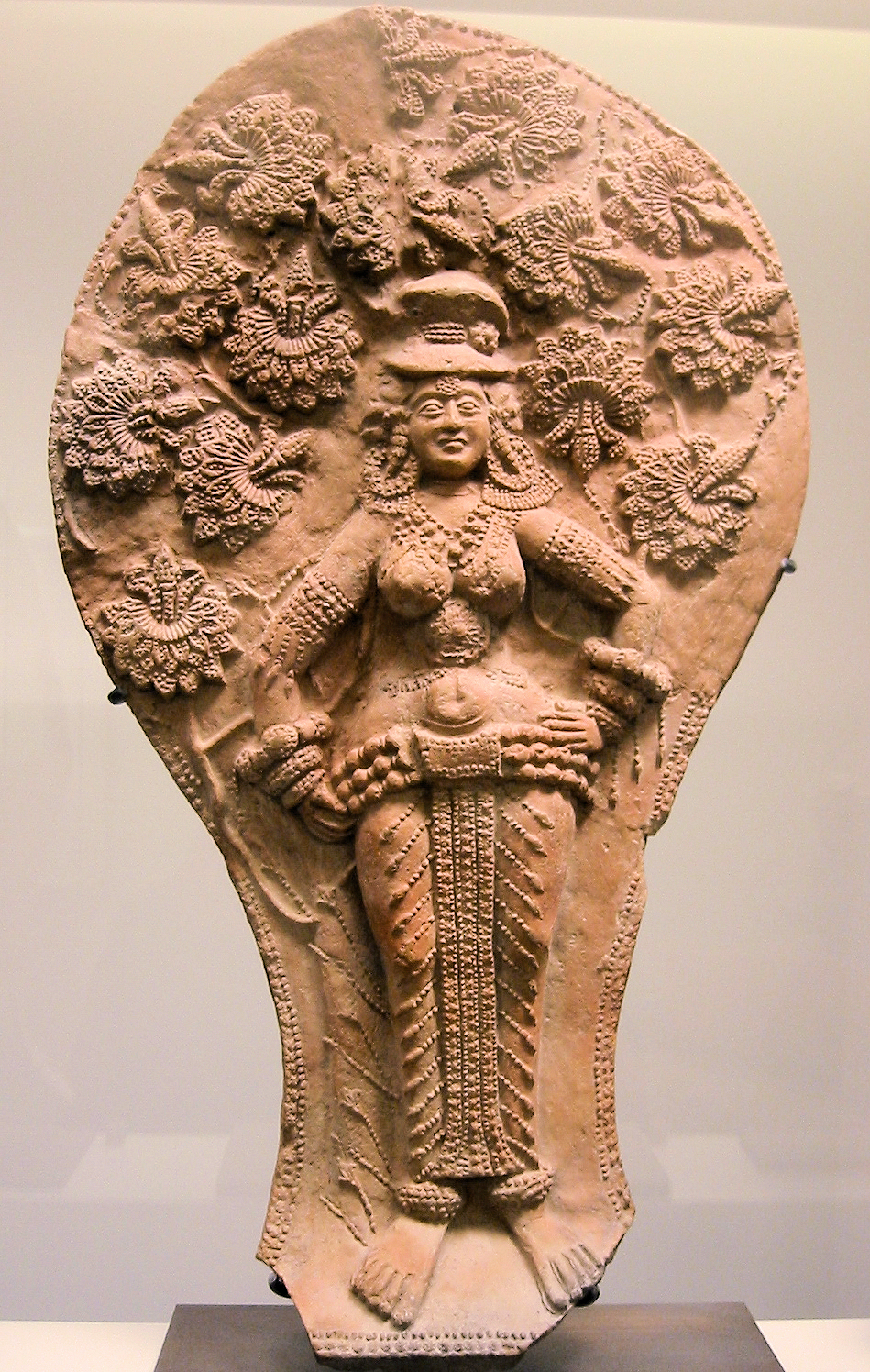
Chandraketugarh figurine

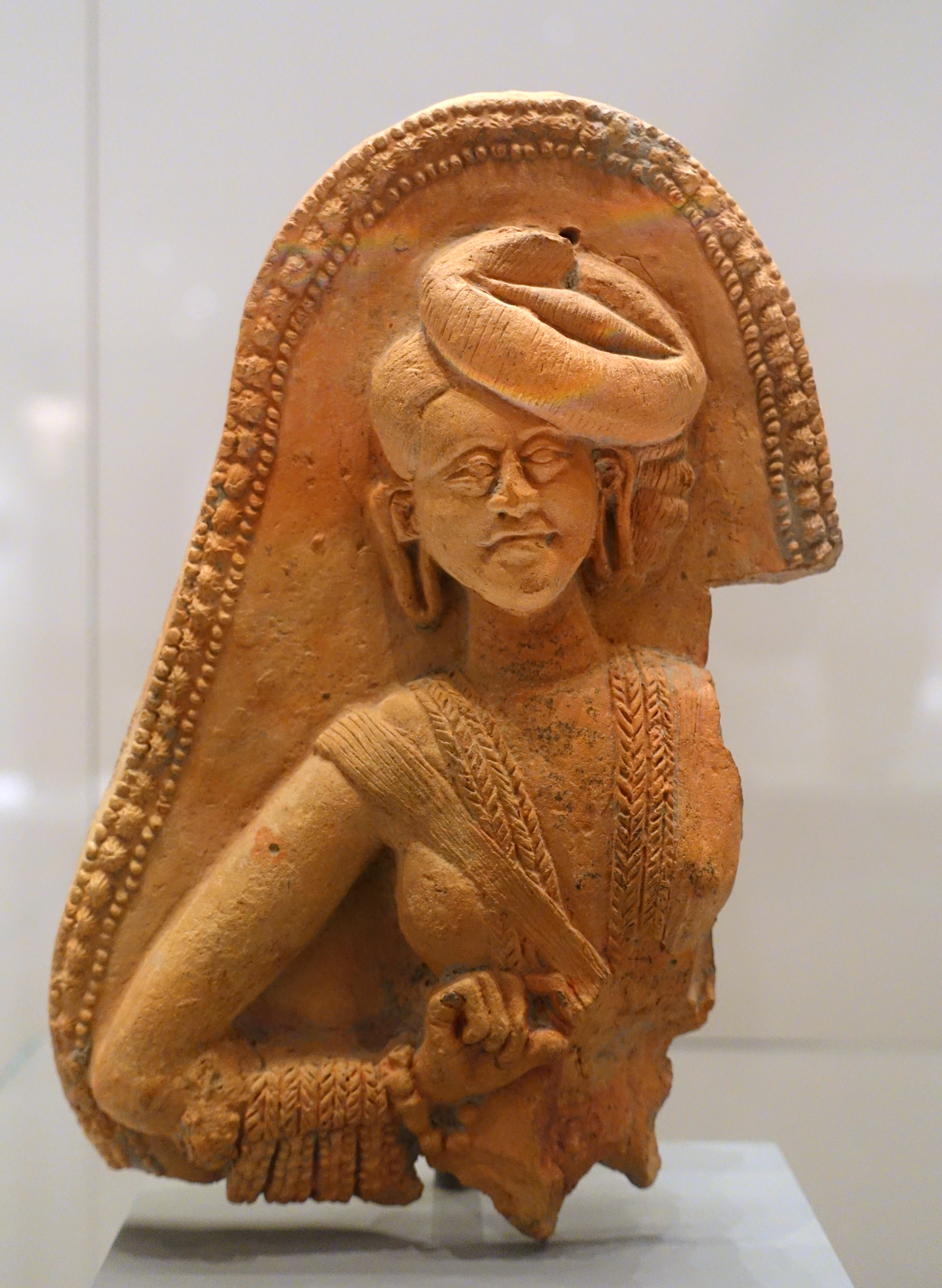
Male figure, Chandraketugarh, India, 2nd-1st century BCE

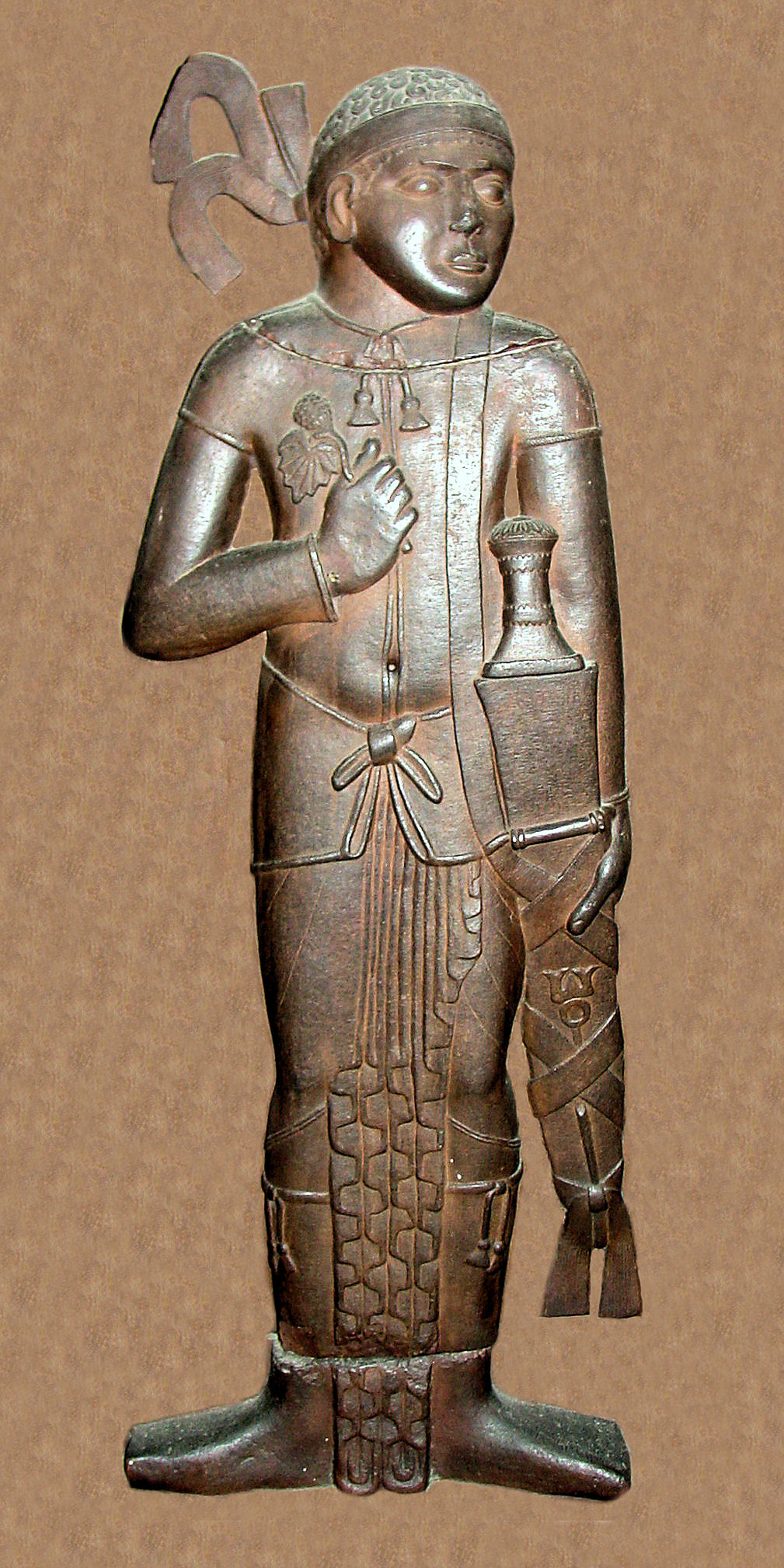
Bharhut Yavana (Greek) Warrior

== Satavahana art ==
The Satavahana dynasty ruled much of the Deccan and sometimes other areas, including Maharashtra, between about the 2nd century BCE and 2nd century CE. They were a Hindu dynasty who made many generous donations to Buddhist monks; some queens may have been Buddhist. The most significant remains of their sculptural patronage are the Sanchi and Amaravati stupas, along with a number of rock-cut complexes.

The Sanchi stupas were constructed by Emperor Ashoka and later expanded by Shungas and Satavahanas. Major work on decorating the site with the Torana gateway and railing was done by the Satavahana Empire.

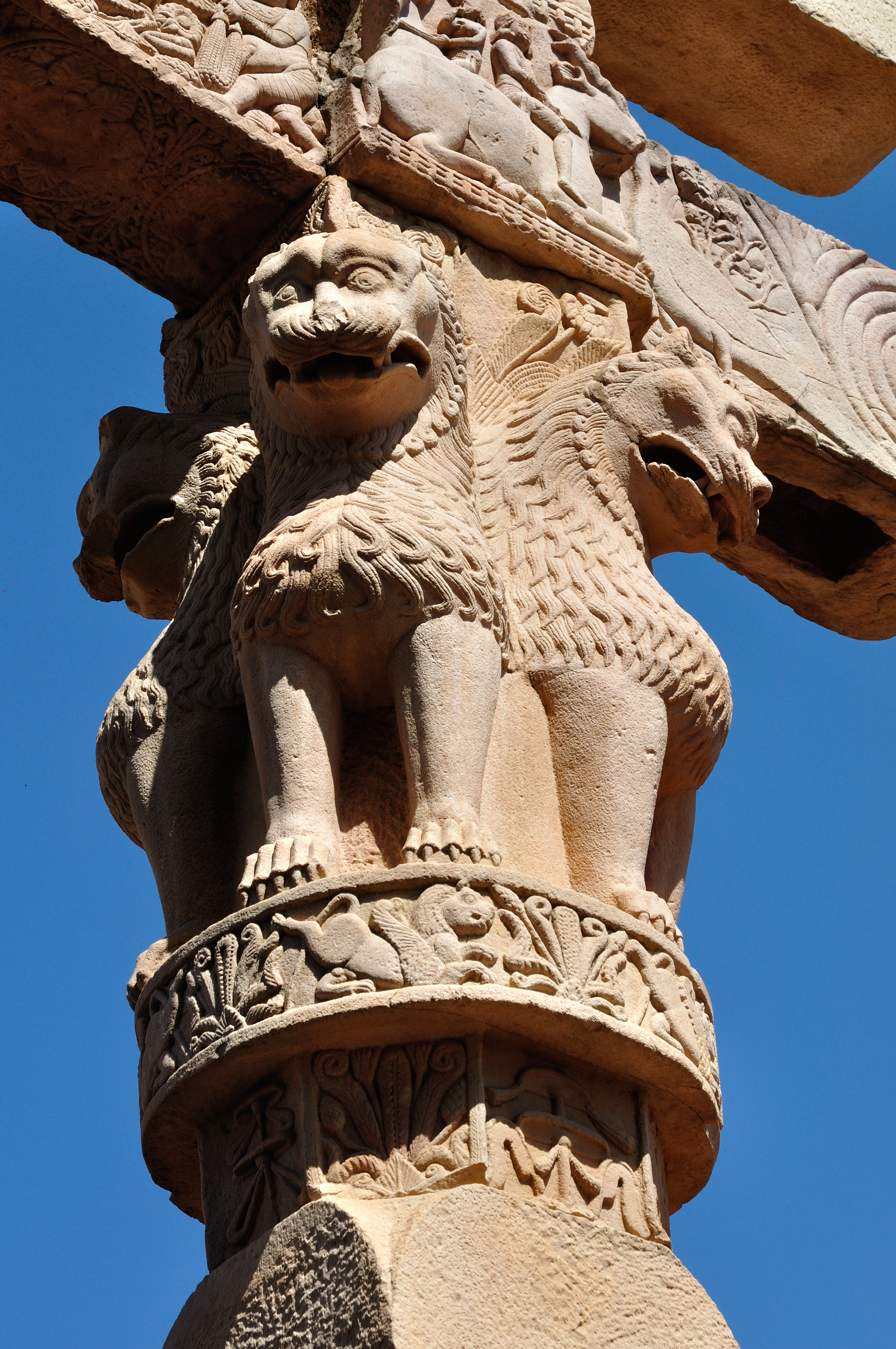
Sanchi gateway

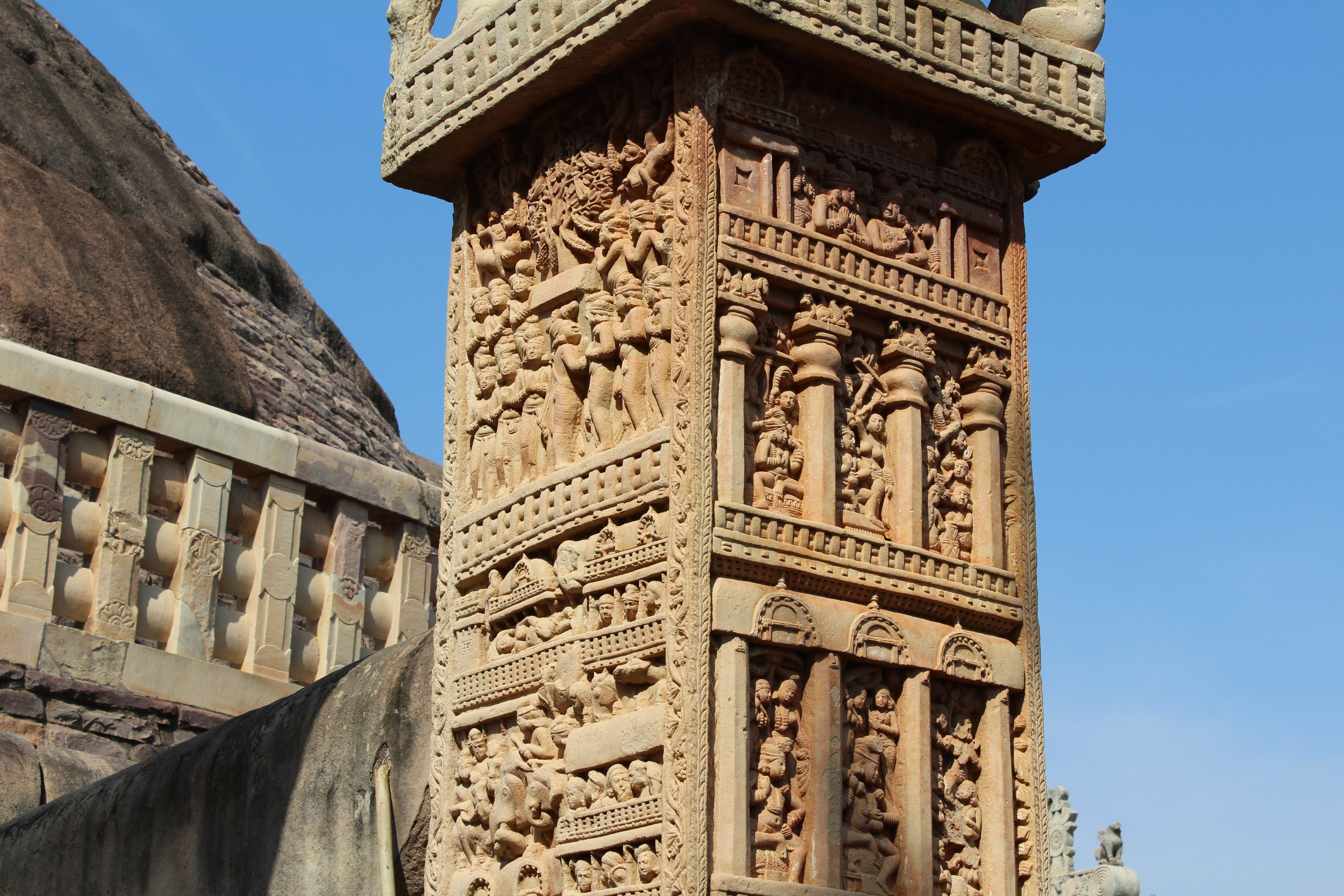
Carved reliefs of Sanchi gateway

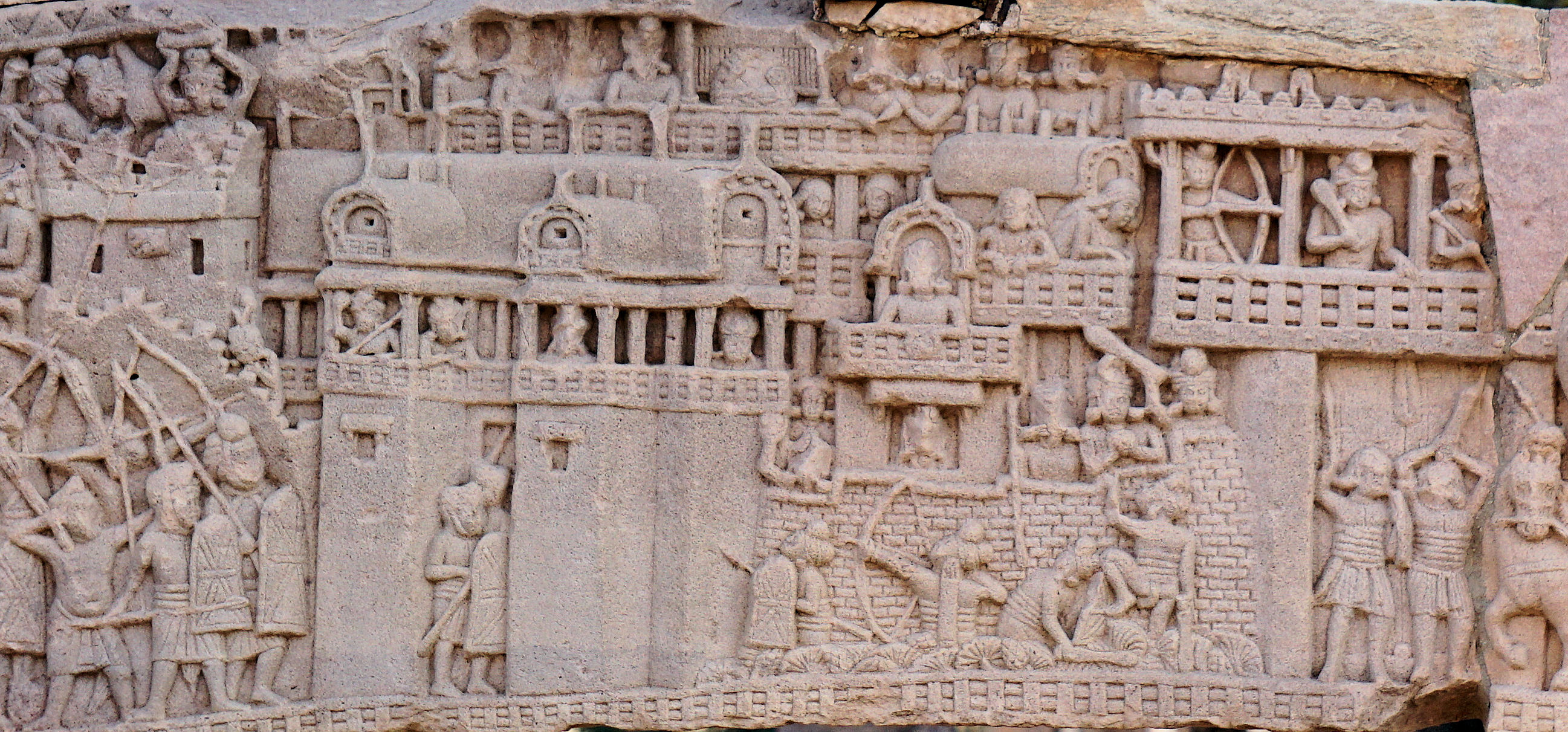
Satavahana relief regarding the city of Kusinagara in the war over the Buddha's relics, South Gate, Stupa no. 1, Sanchi

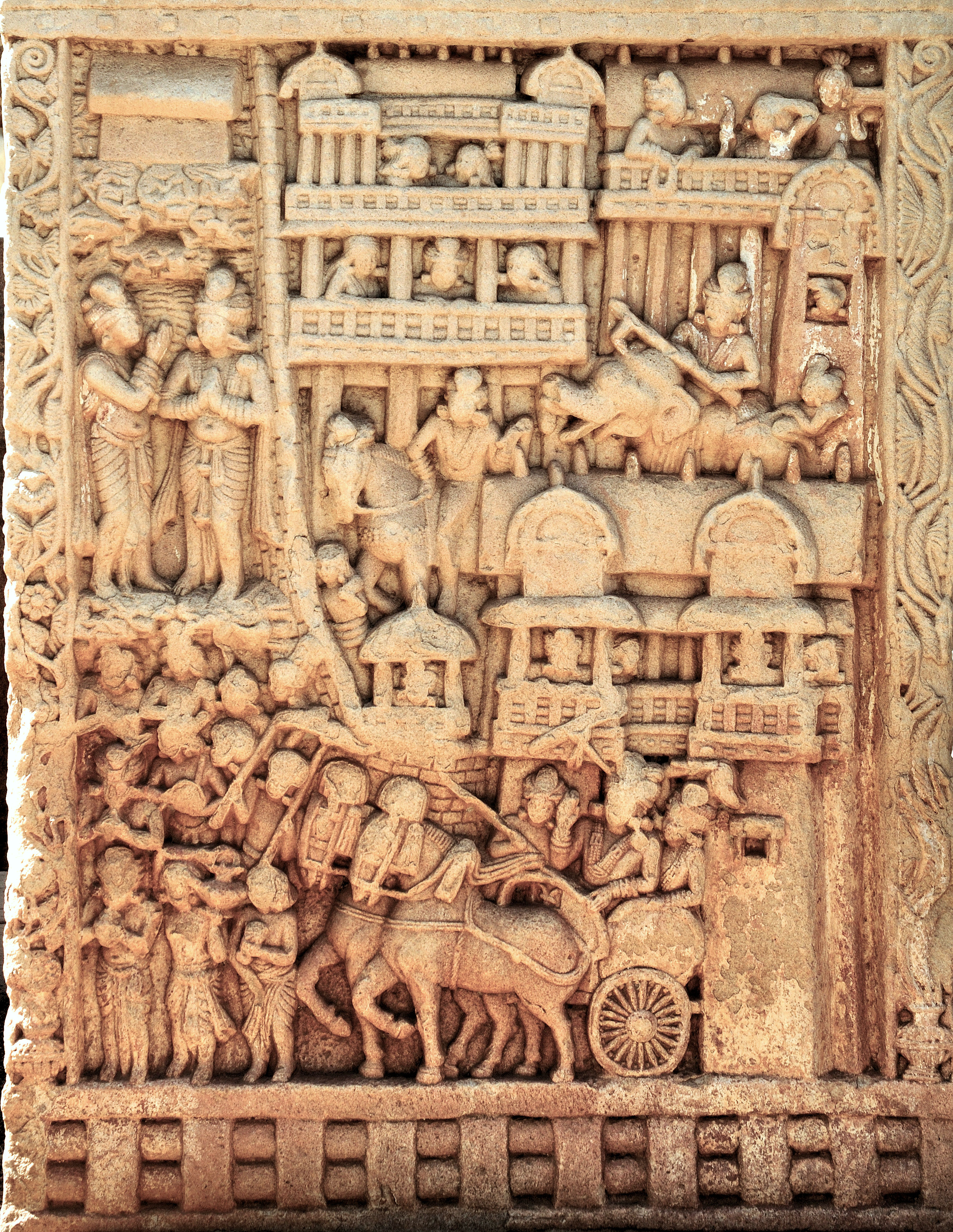
Bimbisara with his royal cortege issuing from the city of Rajagriha to visit the Buddha.

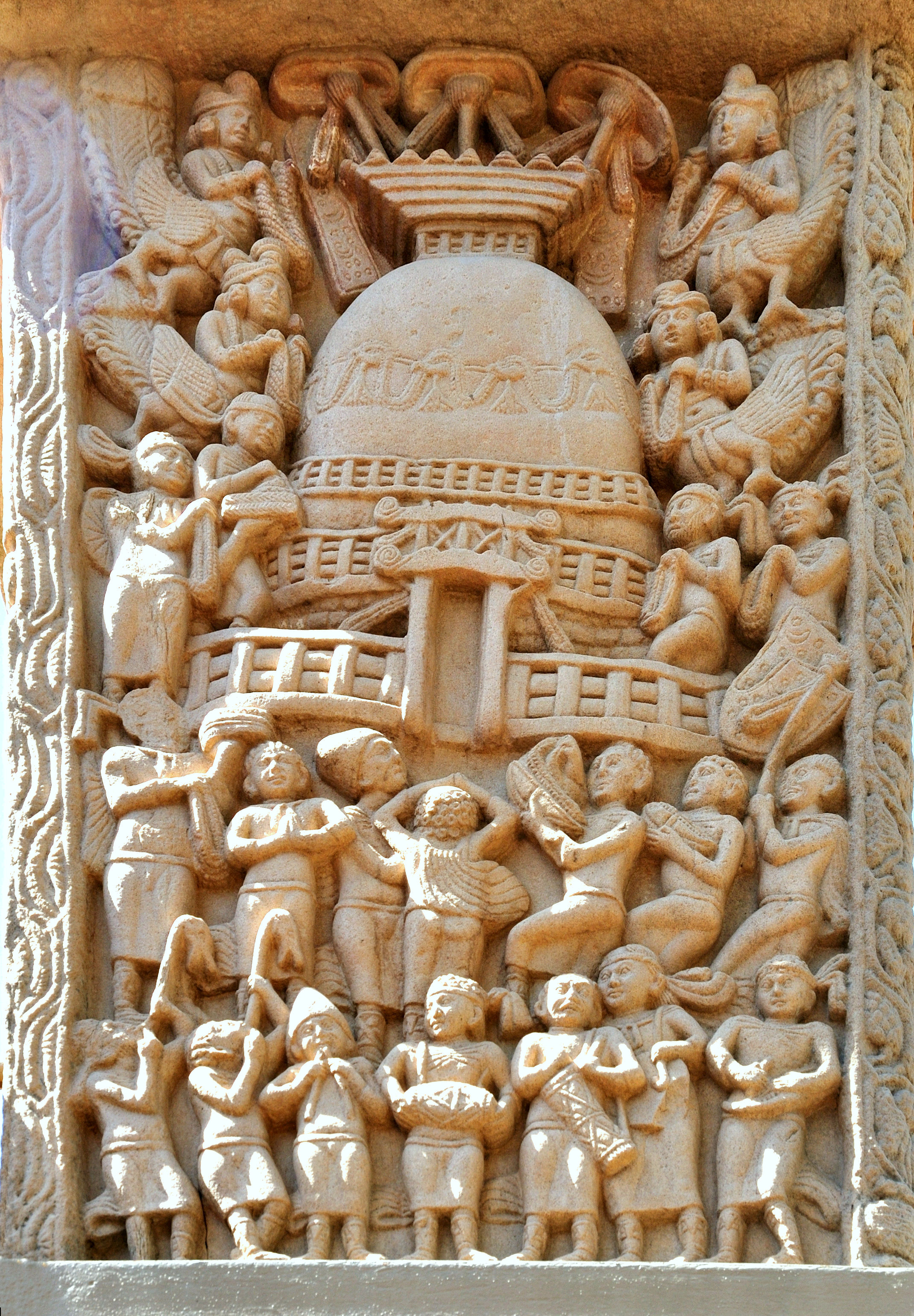
Foreigners making a dedication to the Great Stupa at Sanchi.

=== Cave temples ===
Between the 2nd century BCE and the 2nd century CE, under the Satavahanas, several Buddhist caves propped up along the coastal areas of Maharashtra, and these cave temples were decorated with Satavahana era sculptures and hence not only some of the earliest art depictions, but also evidence of ancient Indian architecture.

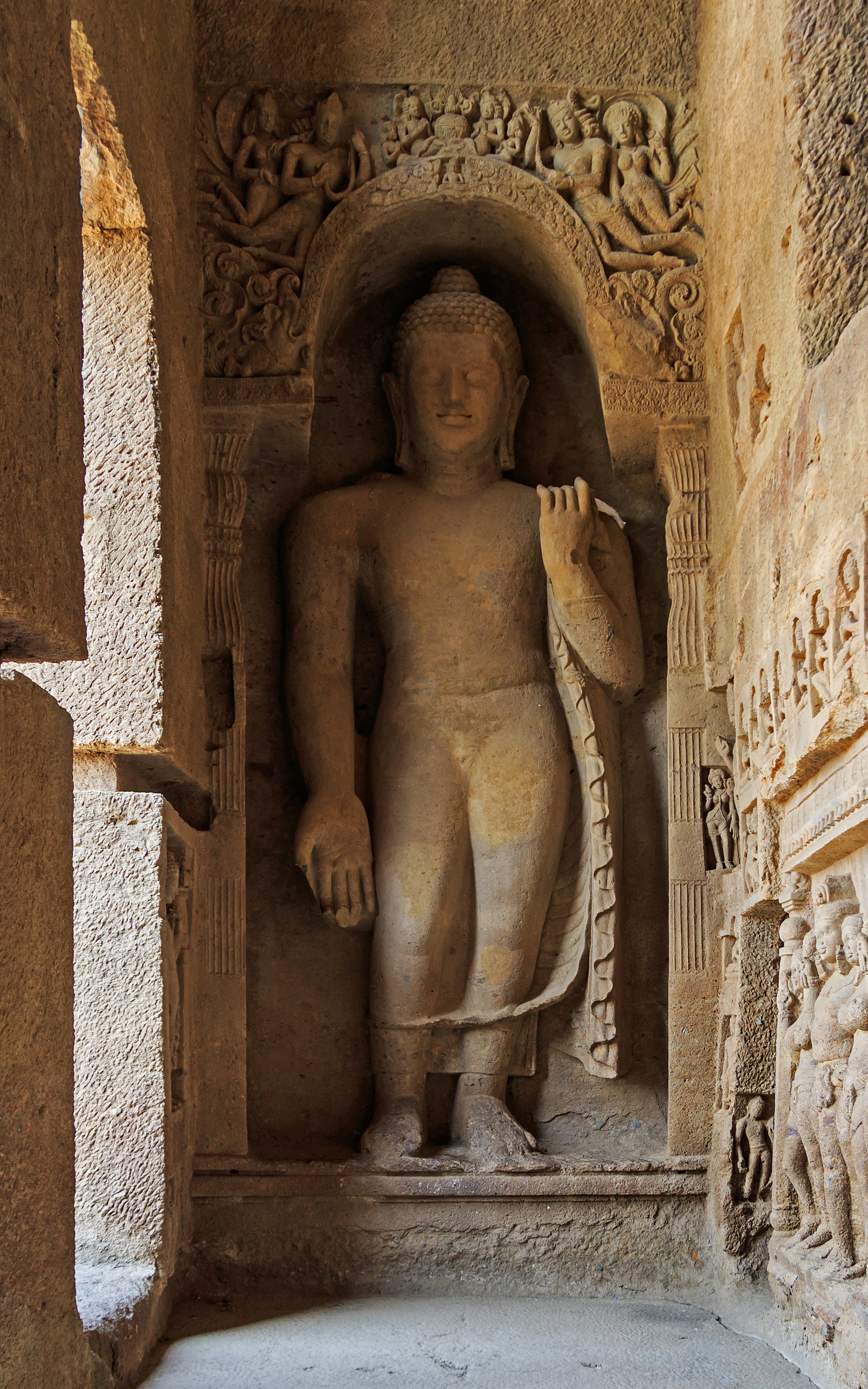
Kanheri Caves Buddha statue

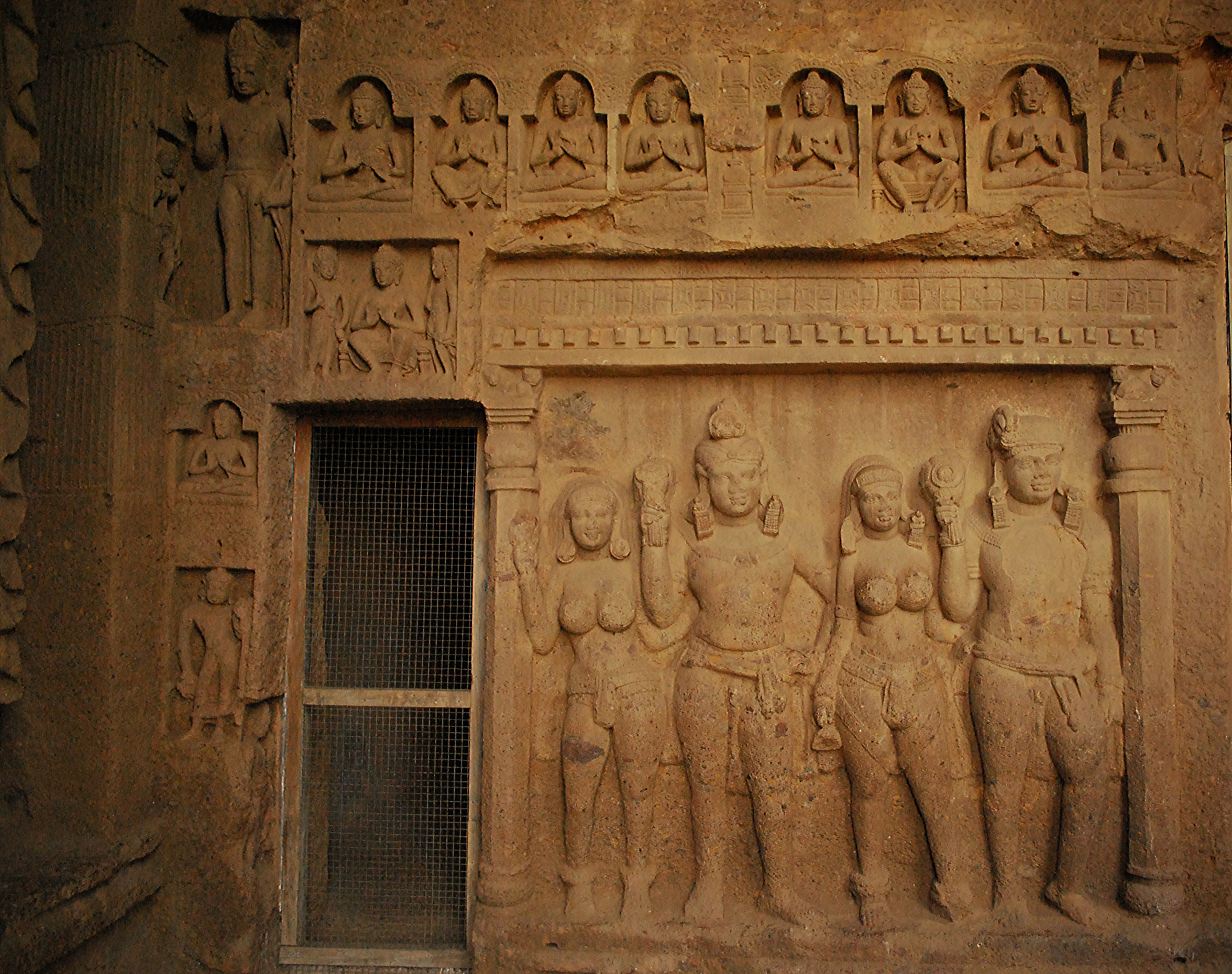
Kanheri Caves statue

=== Amaravati art ===
The Amaravati school of Buddhist art was one of the three major Buddhist sculpture centres along with Mathura and Gandhara, and it flourished under the Satavahanas, many limestone sculptures and tablets which once were plastered Buddhist stupas provide a fascinating insight into major early Buddhist school of arts.

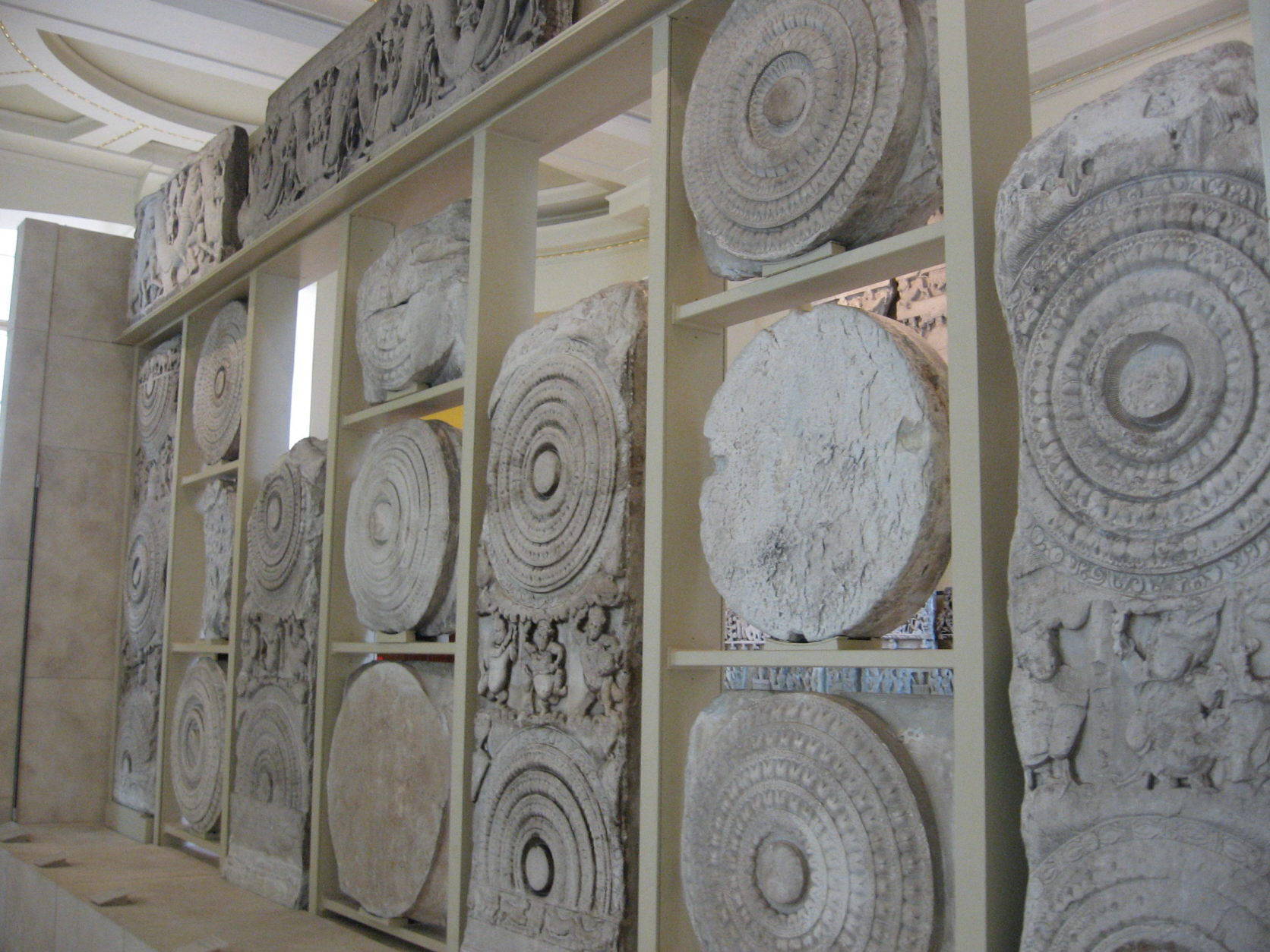
Amaravati Marbles, fragments of Buddhist stupa

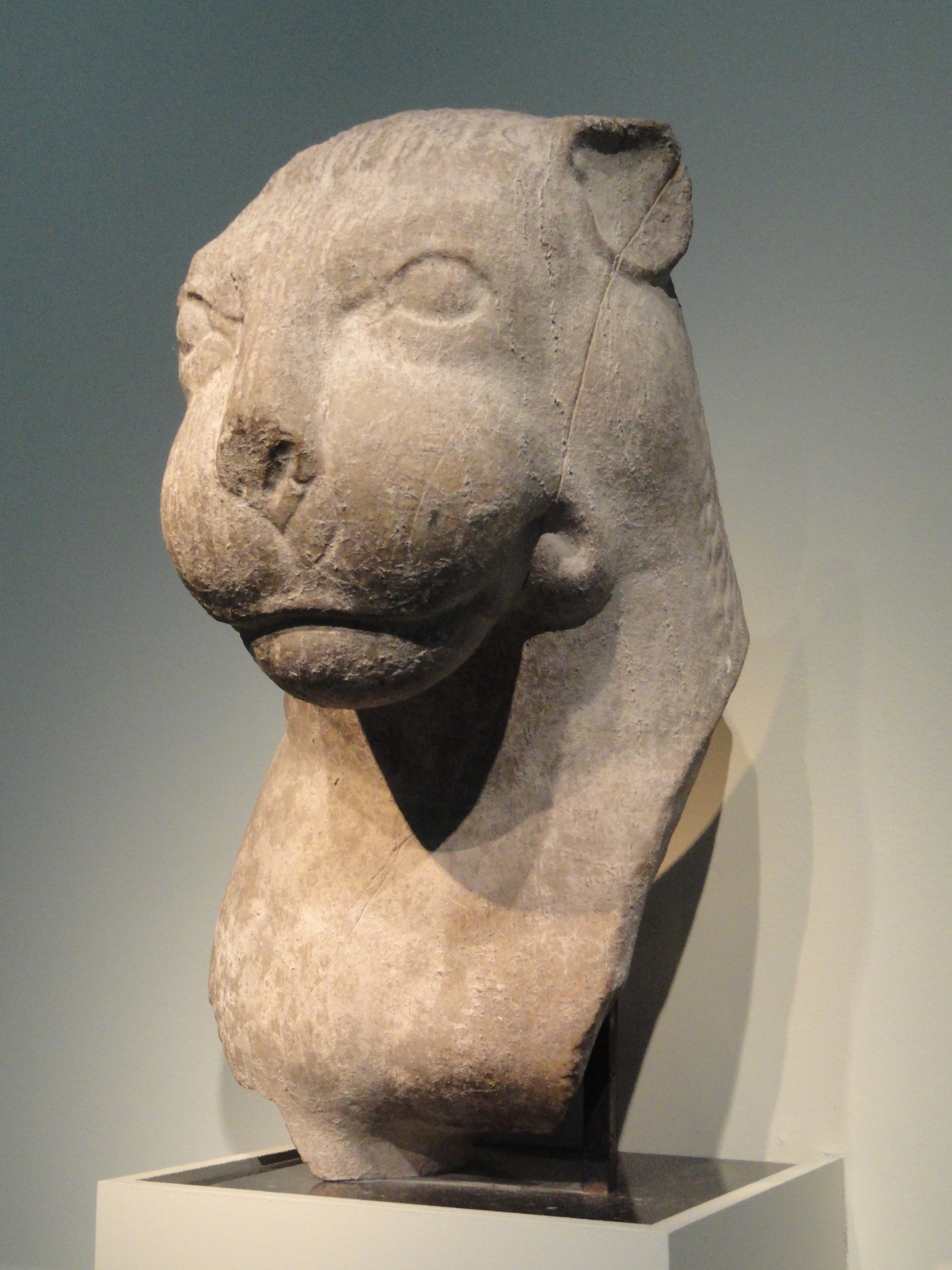
Head of a lion, from Gateway pillar at the Amaravati Stupa

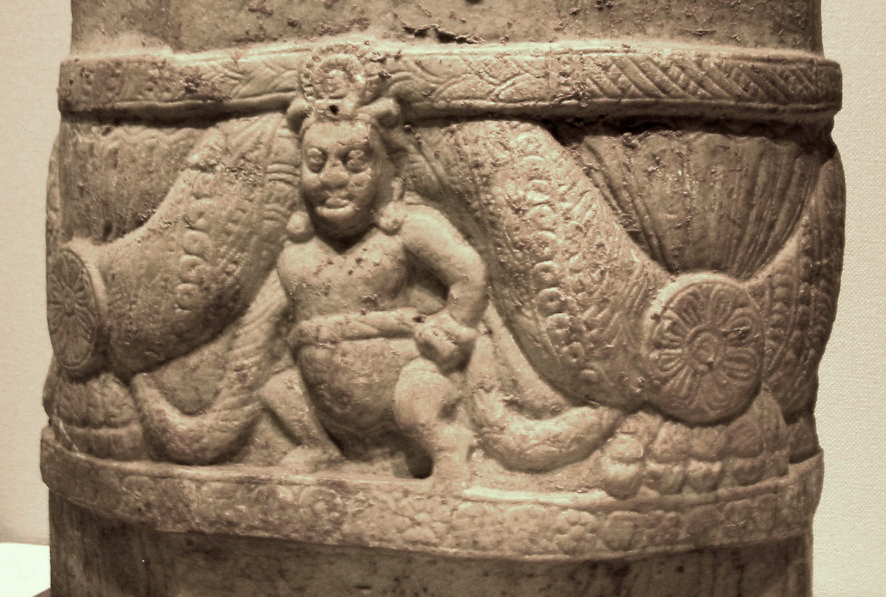
Scroll supported by Indian Yaksha, Amaravati, 2nd–3rd century CE

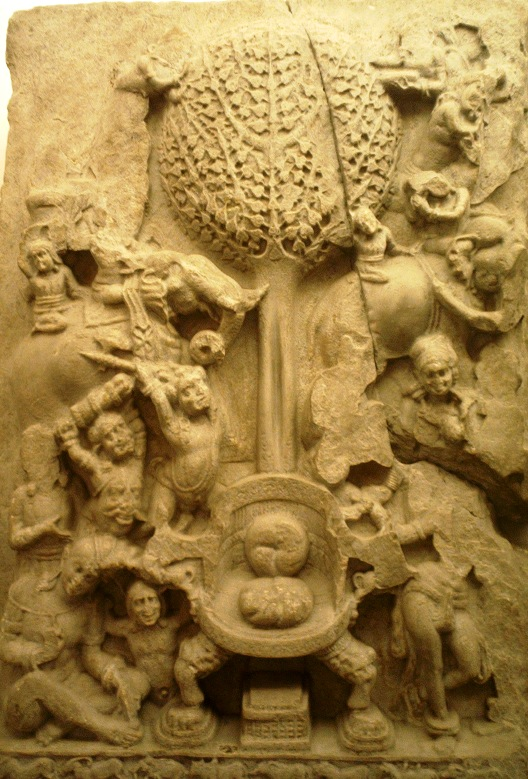
Mara's assault on the Buddha, 2nd century CE, Amaravati

== Early South India ==
Stone sculpture was much later to arrive in South India than in the north, and the earliest period is only represented by the Gudimallam Lingam with a standing figure of Shiva, from the southern tip of Andhra Pradesh. The "mysteriousness" of this "lies in the total absence so far of any object in an even remotely similar manner within many hundreds of miles, and indeed anywhere in South India". It is some 5 ft in height and one foot thick; the penis is relatively naturalistic, with the glans shown clearly. The stone is local, and the style is described by Harle as "Satavahana-related". It is dated to the 3rd century BCE or 2nd/1st century BCE.

Though the hardness of local granites, the relatively limited penetration of Buddhism and Jainism in the deep south, and a presumed persistent preference for wood have all been proposed as factors in the late development of stone architecture and sculpture in the south, "the mystery remains". The form of the Gudimallam Lingam, for example, would be a natural one to evolve in wood, using a straight tree trunk very efficiently, but to say that it did so is pure speculation in our present state of knowledge. Wooden sculpture and architecture have remained common in Kerala, where stone is hard to come by, but this means survivals are very largely limited to the last few centuries.

== Kushana art ==
Seated Bodhisattva with attendants
("Year 4 of the Great King Kanishka")

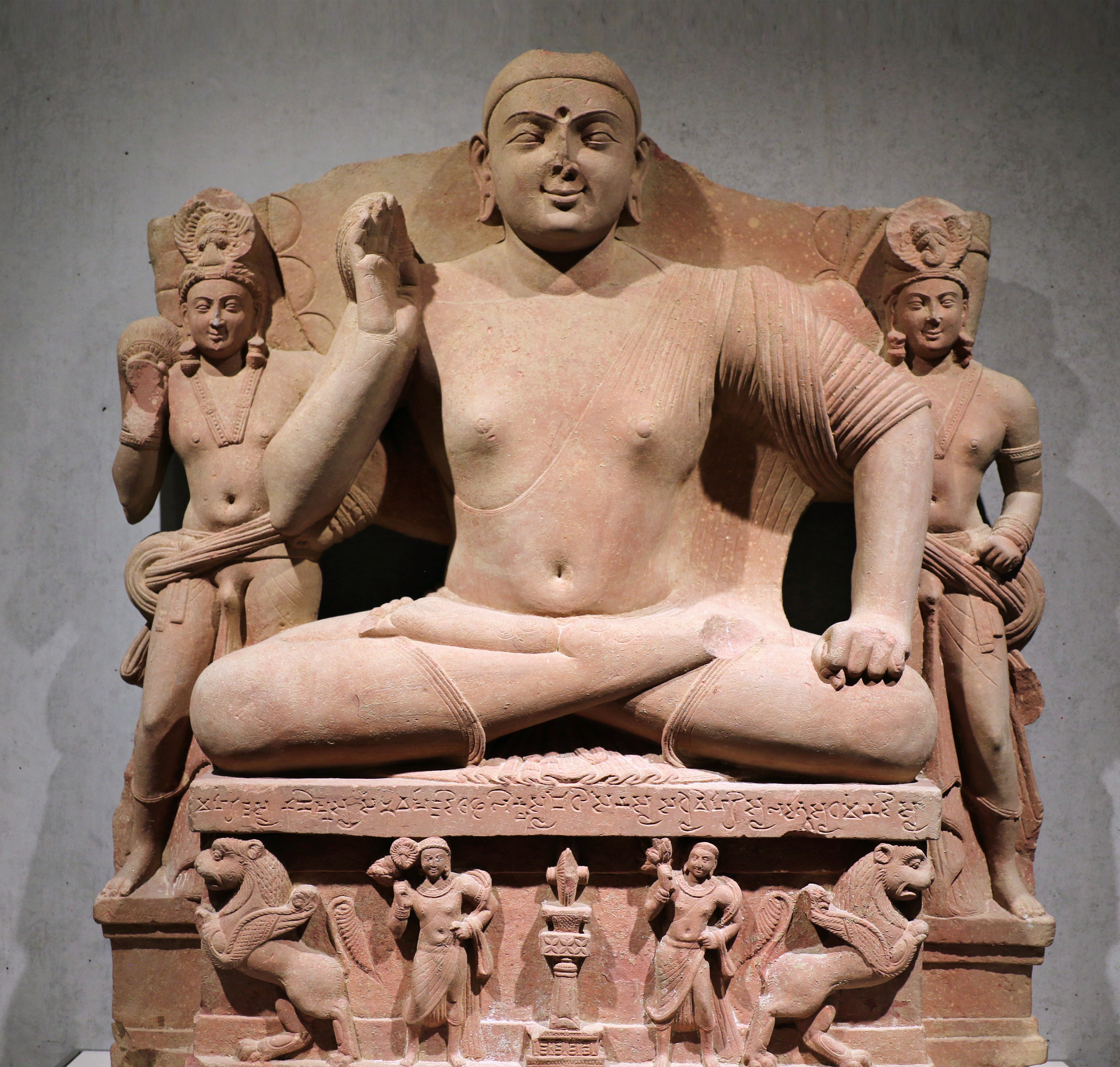
The "Kimbell seated Bodhisattva" with attendants, 131 CE, Mathura. Kimbell Art Museum

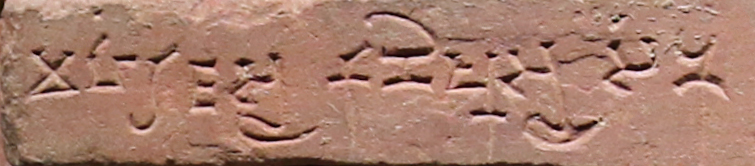
On the pedestal, Brahmi inscription:
𑁕
Maharajasya Kanishkasya Sam 4
"Year 4 of the Great King Kanishka"

Kushan art is highlighted by the appearance of extensive Buddhist arts in the form of Mathuras, Gandharan, and Amaravathi schools of art.

=== Mathura art ===
Mathura art flourished in the ancient city of Mathura and predominantly red sandstone has been used in making Buddhist and Jain sculptures.

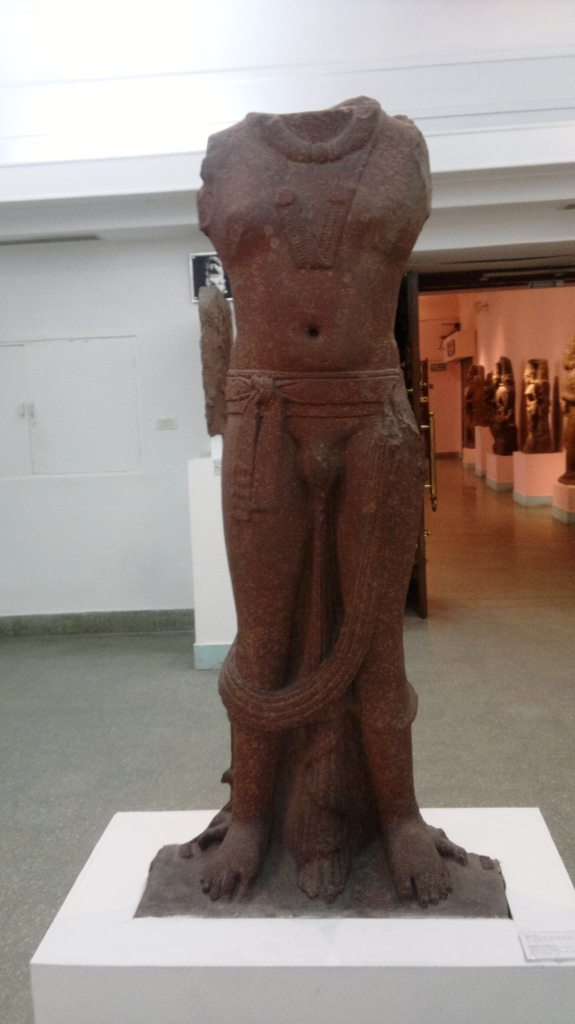
Spotted red sandstone Bodhisattwa, Mathura Art, Kushan Empire, 2nd century CE

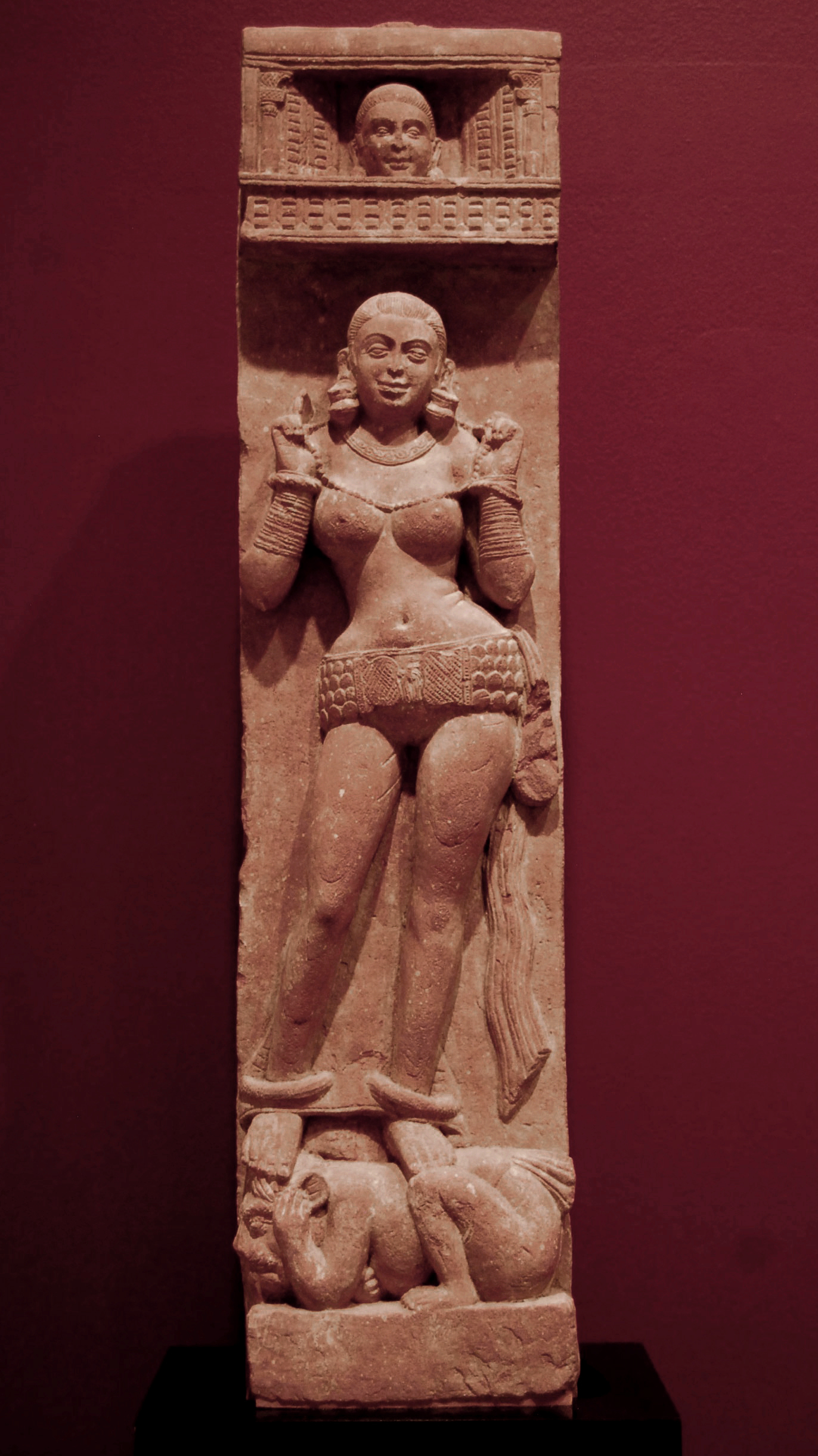
Yakshi Mathura

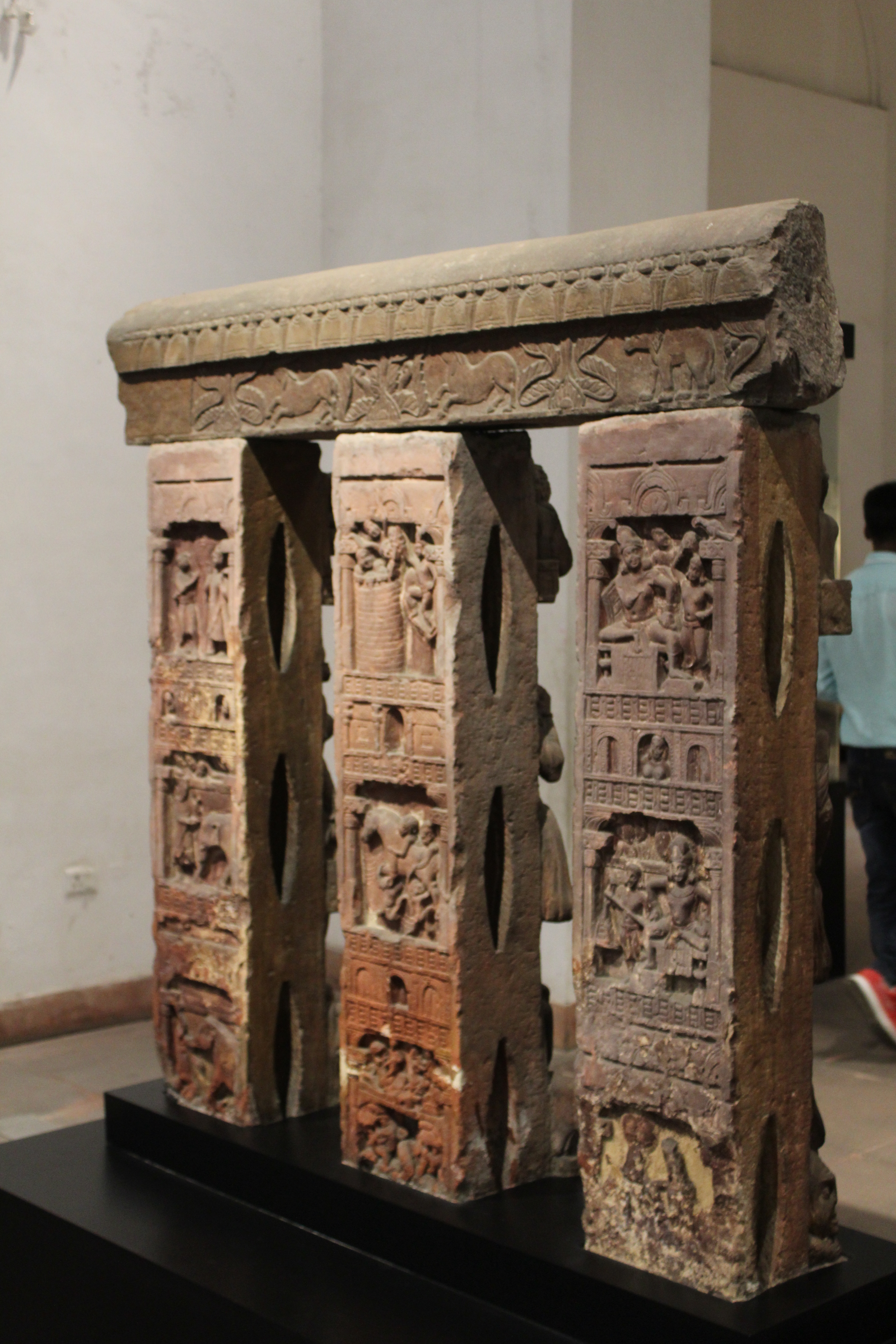
Sibijataka and other Buddhist legends, Mathura art, 2nd century CE

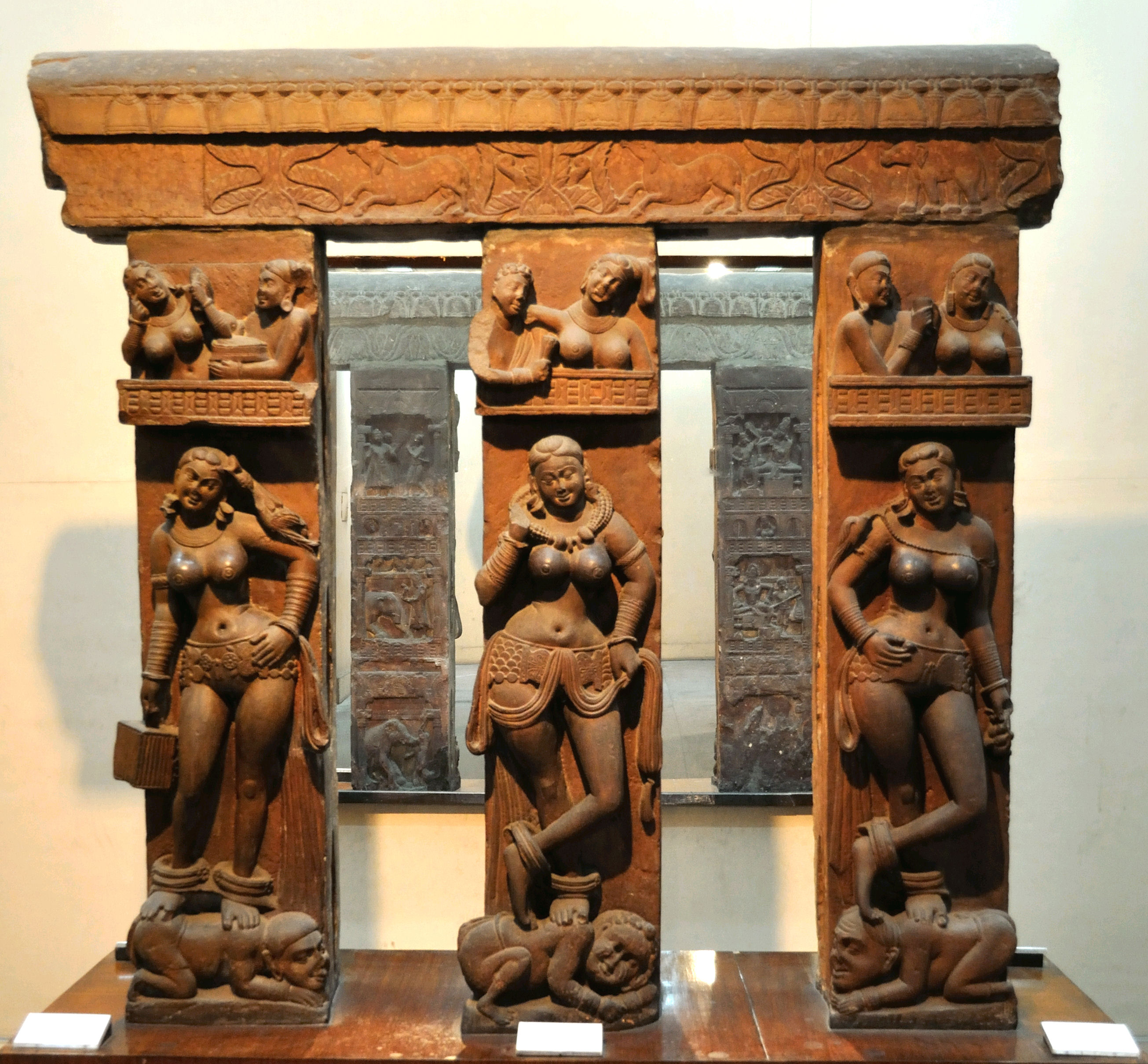
Bhutesvara Yakshis, reliefs from Mathura, 2nd century CE

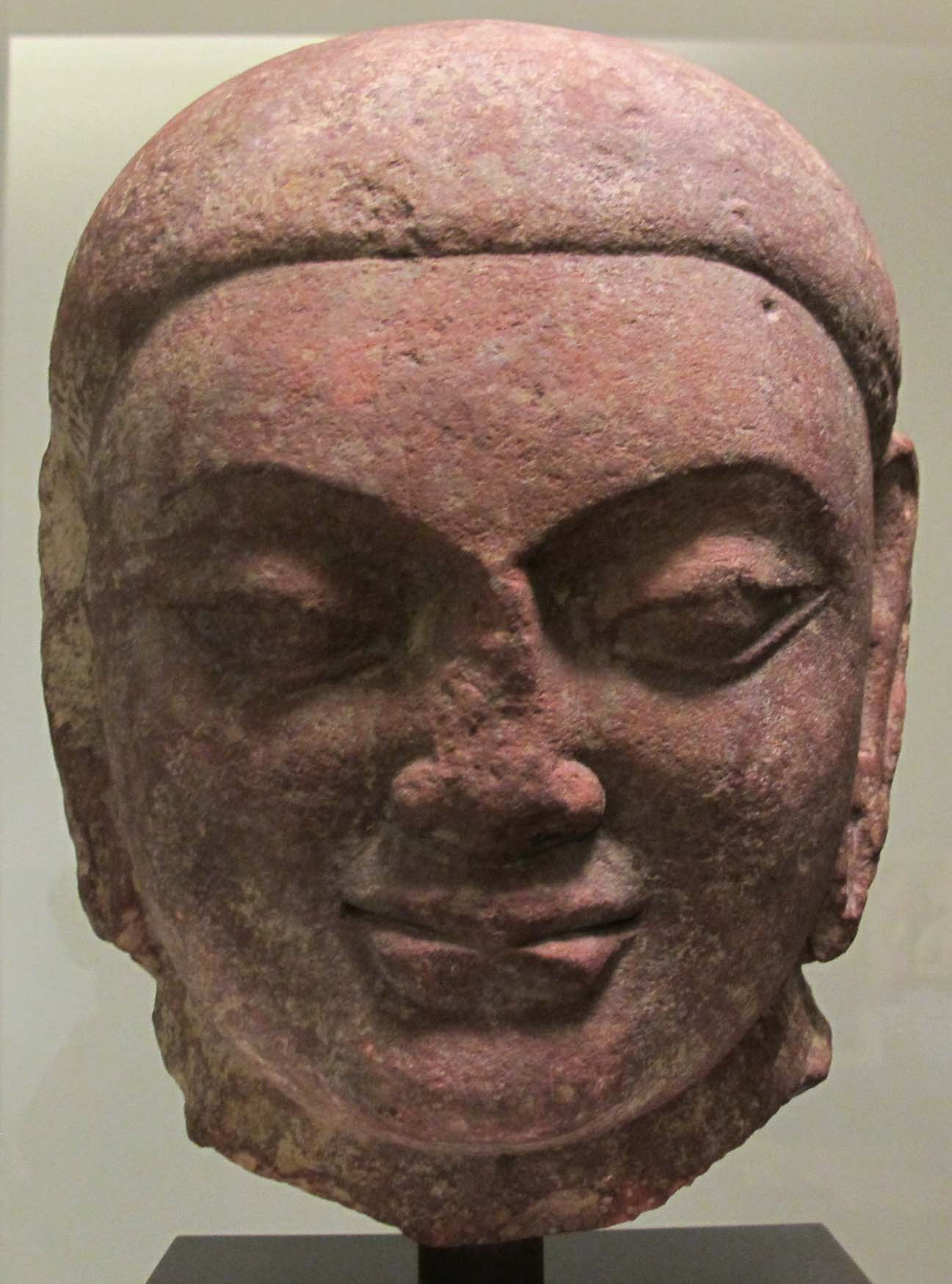
Tirthankara Head, Kushan Period, Mathura

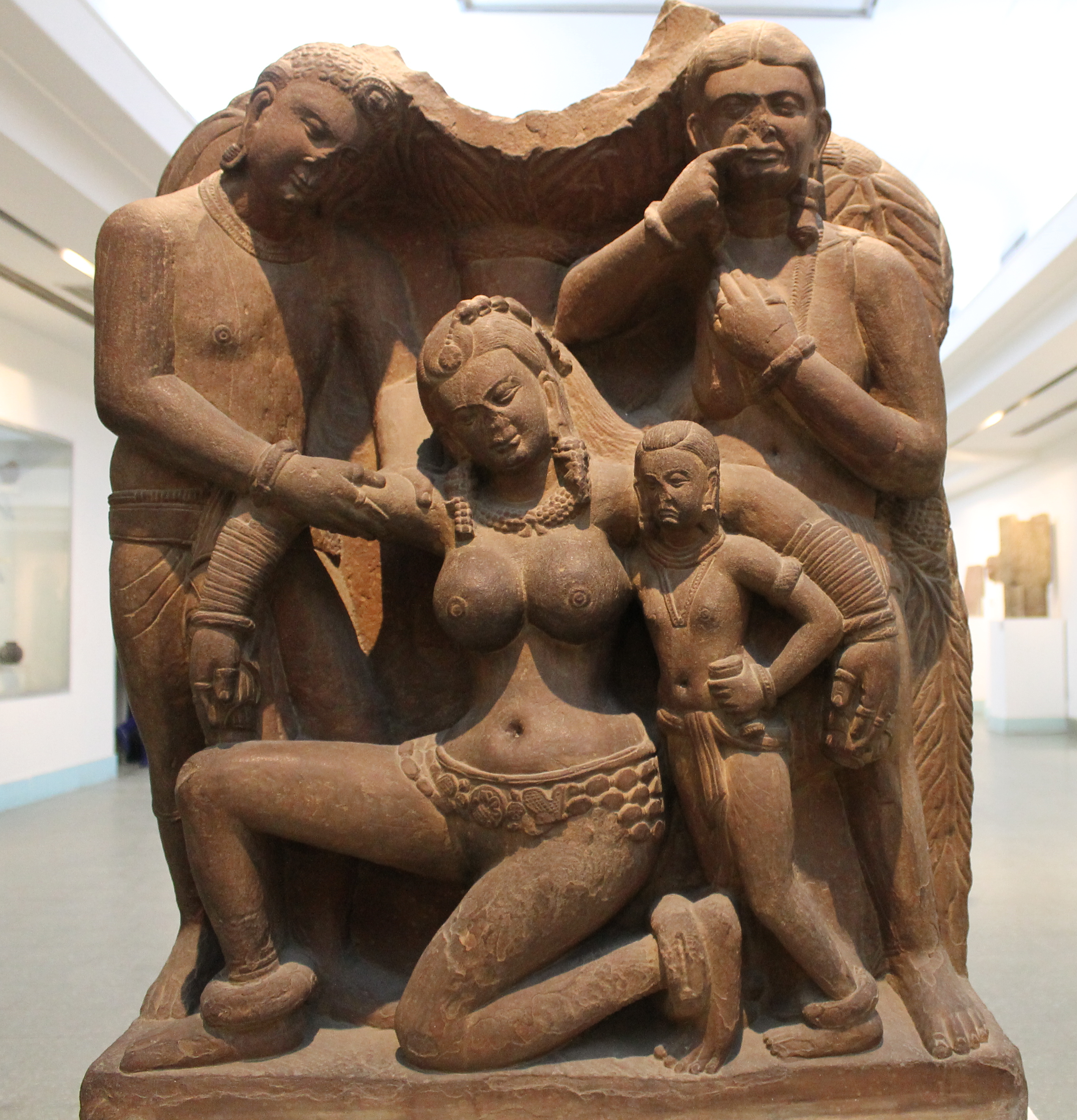
Bacchanalian scene. Mathura

=== Gandharan art ===
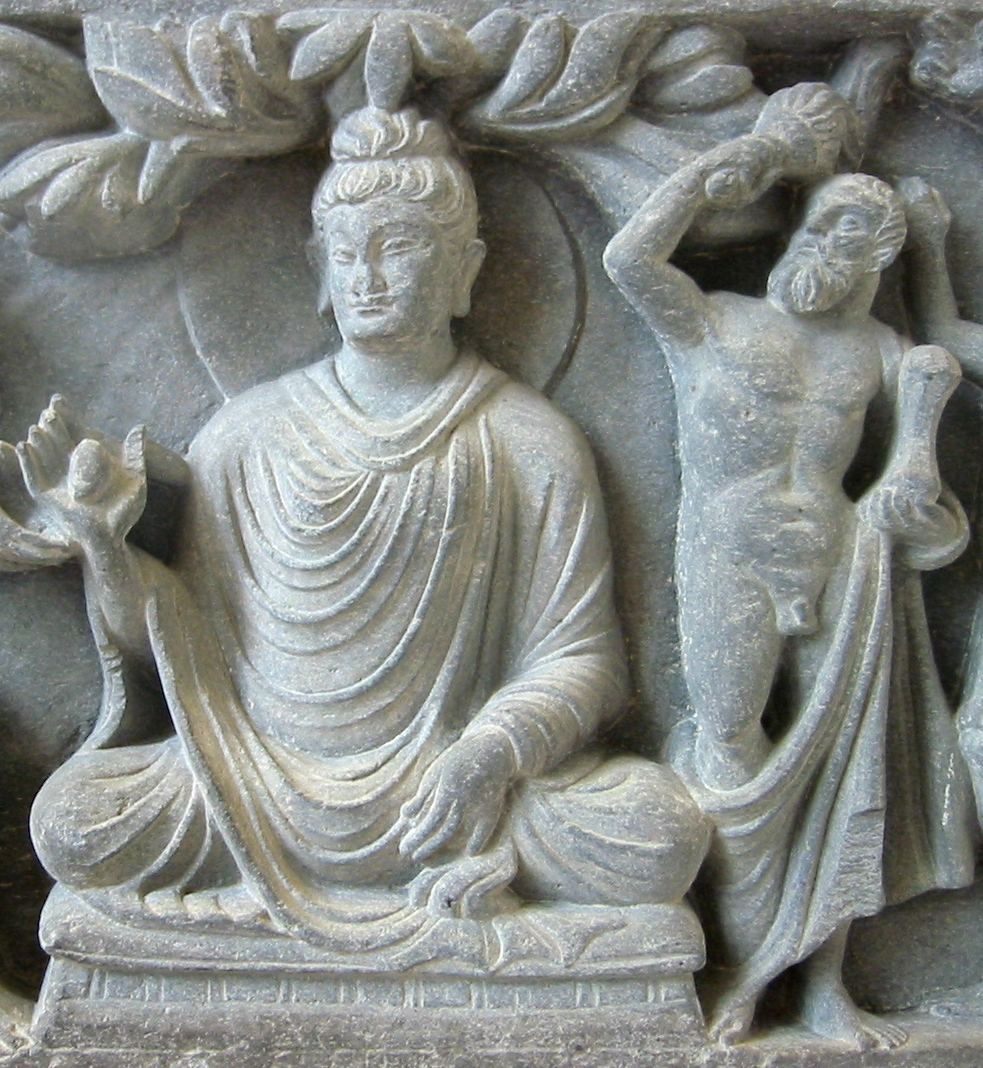
Heracles depiction of Vajrapani as the protector of the Buddha, 2nd century CE, Gandhara, British Museum.

Greco-Buddhist art is the artistic manifestation of Greco-Buddhism, a cultural syncretism between the Classical Greek culture and Buddhism, which developed over a period of close to 1000 years in Central Asia, between the conquests of Alexander the Great in the 4th century BCE and the Islamic conquests of the 7th century CE. Greco-Buddhist art is characterized by the strong idealistic realism of Hellenistic art and the first representations of the Buddha in human form, which have helped define the artistic (and particularly, sculptural) canon for Buddhist art throughout the Asian continent up to the present. Though dating is uncertain, it appears that strongly Hellenistic styles lingered in the East for several centuries after they had declined around the Mediterranean, as late as the 5th century CE. Some aspects of Greek art were adopted, while others did not spread beyond the Greco-Buddhist area; in particular the standing figure, often with a relaxed pose and one leg flexed, and the flying cupids or victories, who became popular across Asia as apsaras. Greek foliage decoration was also influential, with Indian versions of the Corinthian capital appearing.

Although India had a long sculptural tradition and a mastery of rich iconography, the Buddha was never represented in human form before this time, but only through some of his symbols. This may be because Gandharan Buddhist sculpture in modern Afghanistan displays Greek and Persian artistic influence. Artistically, the Gandharan school of sculpture is said to have contributed wavy hair, drapery covering both shoulders, shoes and sandals, acanthus leaf decorations, etc.

The origins of Greco-Buddhist art are to be found in the Hellenistic Greco-Bactrian kingdom (250 BCE – 130 BCE), located in today's Afghanistan, from which Hellenistic culture radiated into the Indian subcontinent with the establishment of the small Indo-Greek kingdom (180 BCE-10 BCE). Under the Indo-Greeks and then the Kushans, the interaction of Greek and Buddhist culture flourished in the area of Gandhara, in today's northern Pakistan, before spreading further into India, influencing the art of Mathura, and then the Hindu art of the Gupta Empire, which was to extend to the rest of South-East Asia. The influence of Greco-Buddhist art also spread northward towards Central Asia, strongly affecting the art of the Tarim Basin and the Dunhuang Caves, and ultimately the sculpted figure in China, Korea, and Japan.

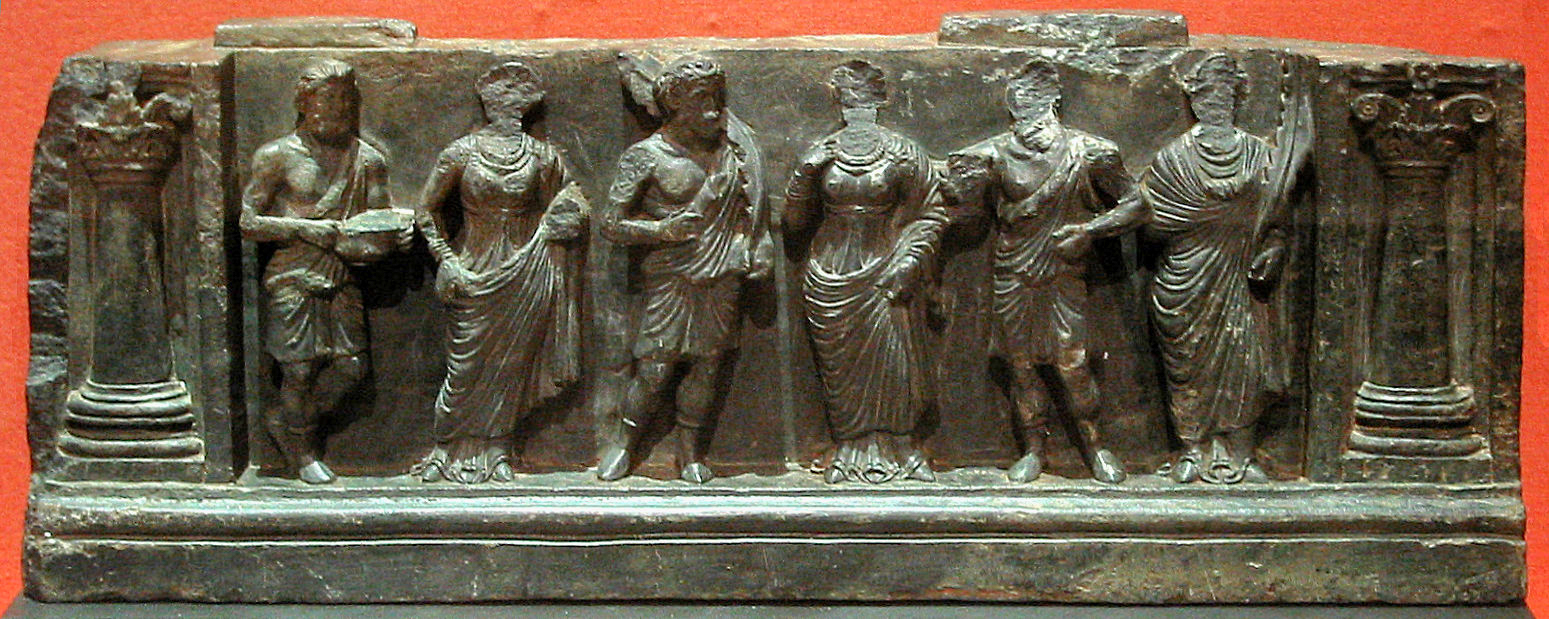
Gandhara frieze with devotees, holding plantain leaves, in purely Hellenistic style, inside Corinthian columns, 1st–2nd century CE. Buner, Swat, Pakistan. Victoria and Albert Museum

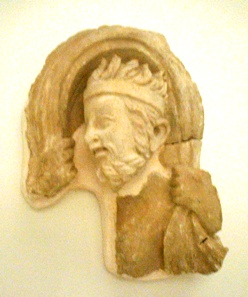
Fragment of the wind god Boreas, Hadda, Afghanistan.

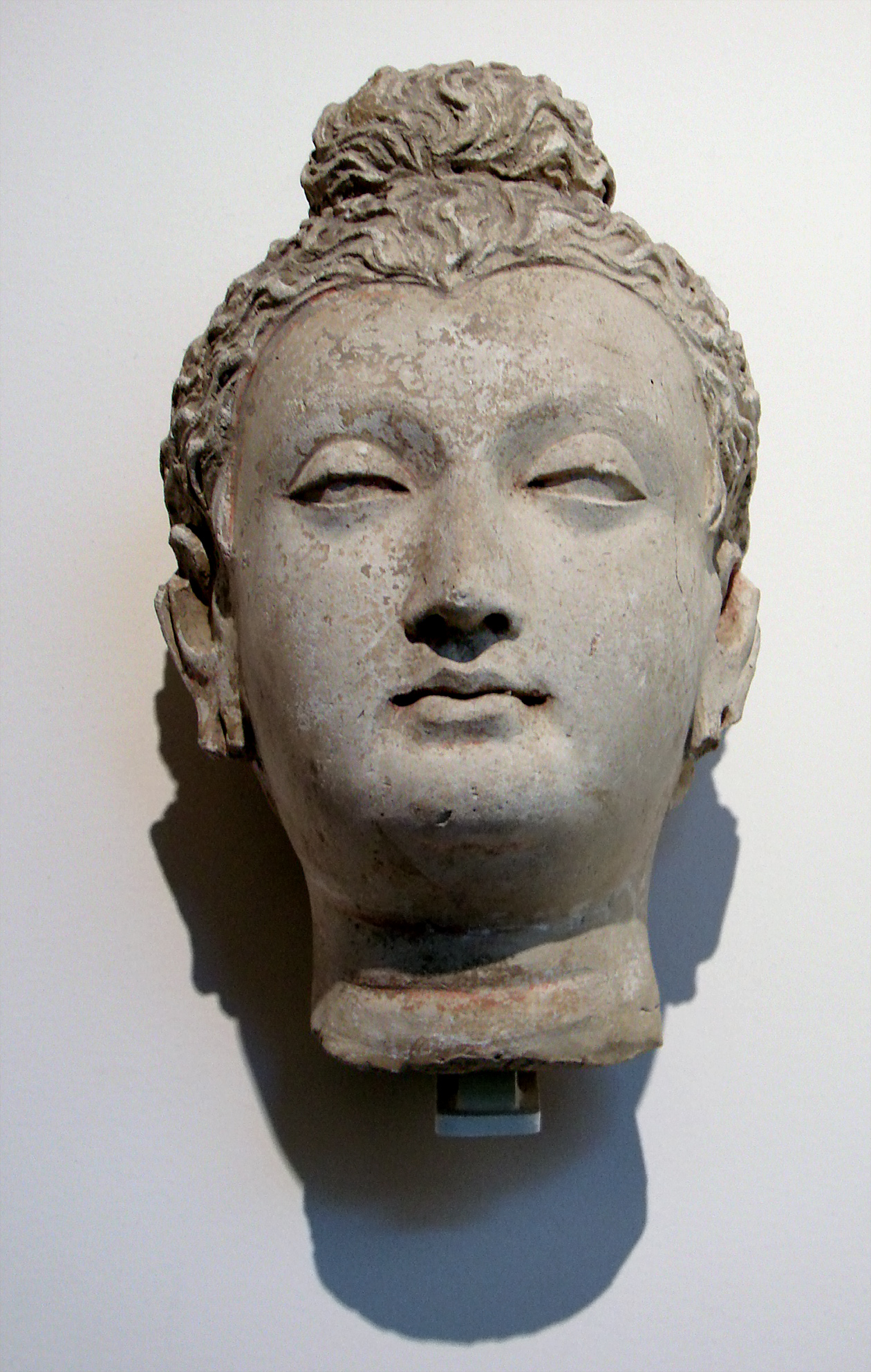
Stucco Buddha head from Hadda, Afghanistan, 3rd–4th centuries. This was painted.

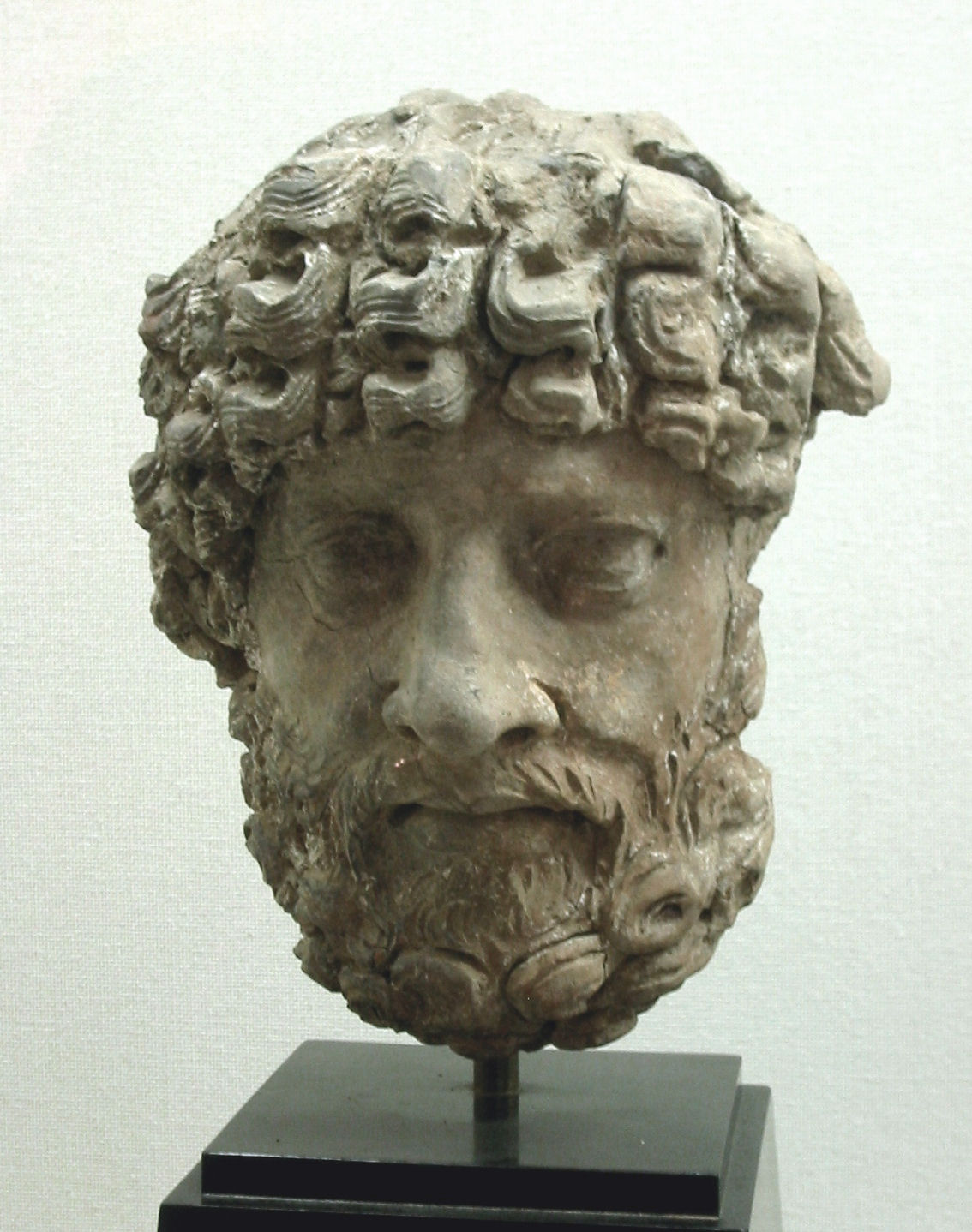
Gandhara Poseidon (Ancient Orient Museum)

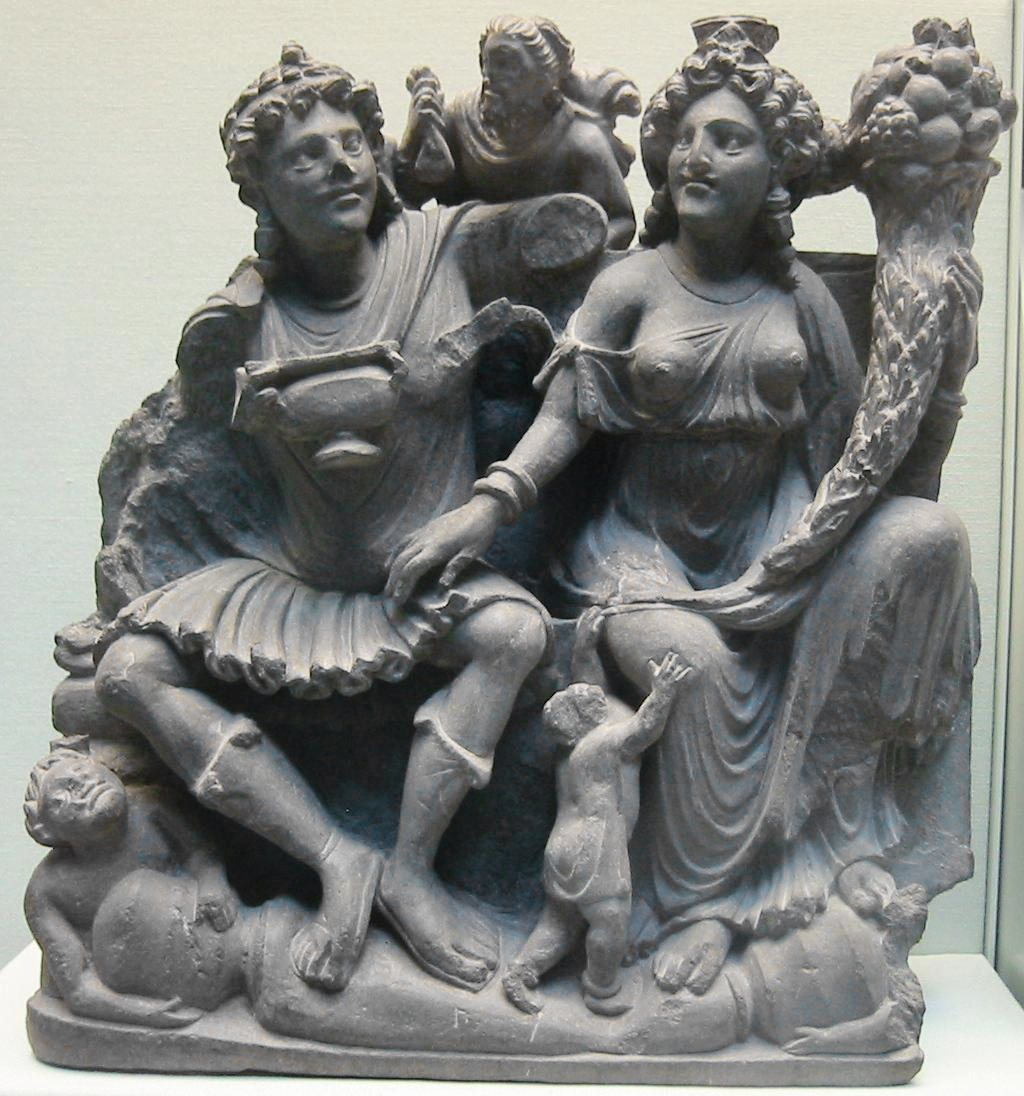
The Buddhist gods Pancika (left) and Hariti (right), 3rd century, Gandhara

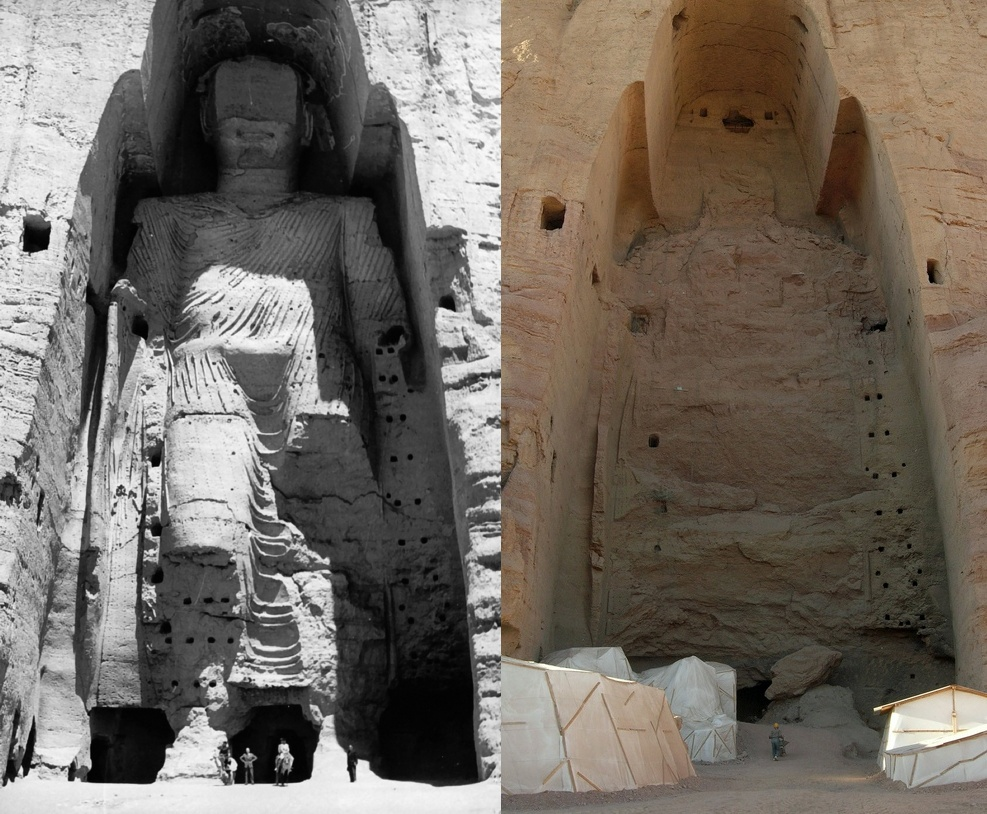
Taller Buddha of Bamiyan, c. 547 AD., in 1963 and in 2008 after they were dynamited and destroyed in March 2001 by the Taliban

=== Gupta art ===
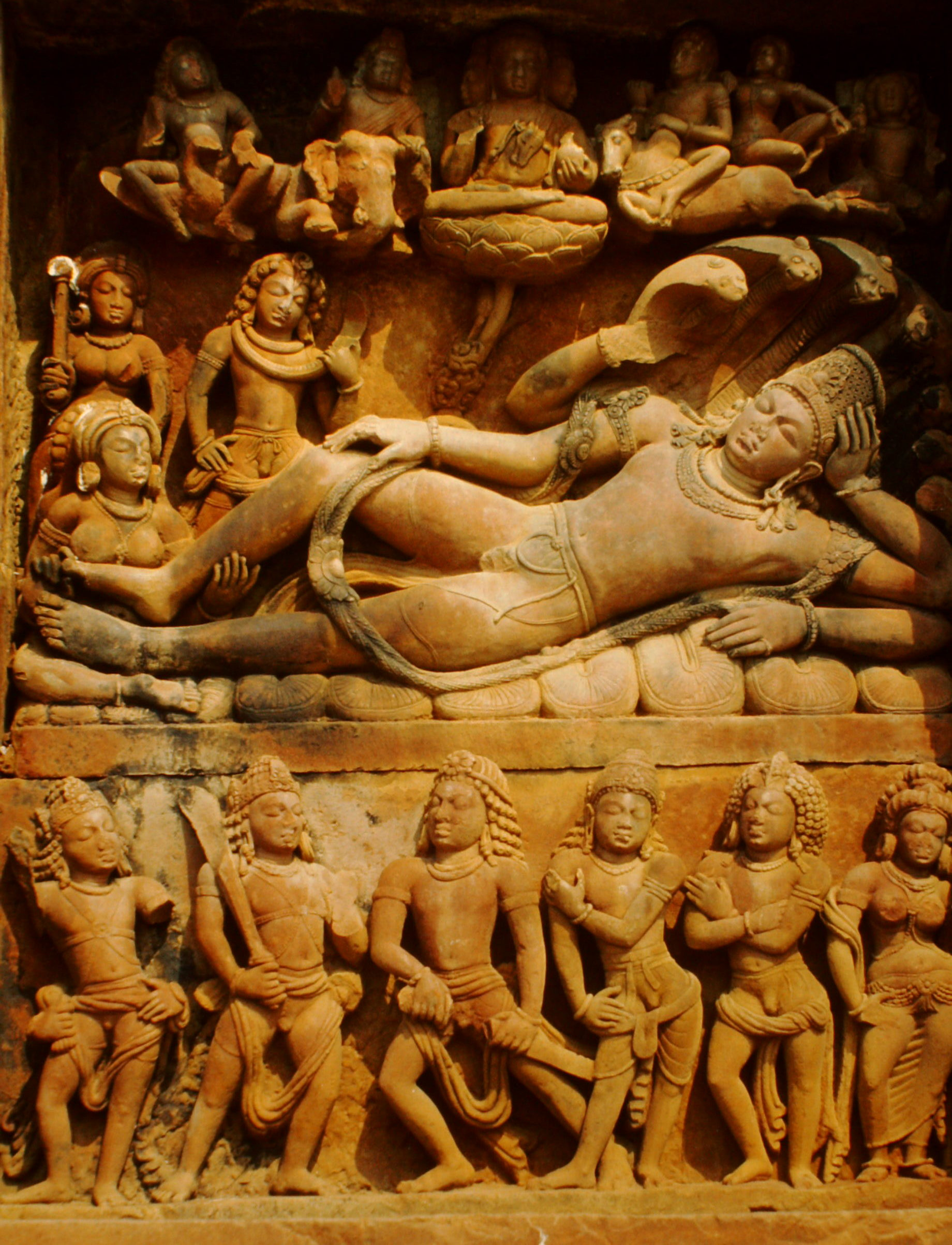
Vishnu sleeping, protected by Shesha, Dashavatara Temple, Deogarh

Gupta art is the style of art, surviving almost entirely as sculpture, developed under the Gupta Empire, which ruled most of northern India, with its peak between about 300 and 480 CE, surviving in much reduced form until c. 550. The Gupta period is generally regarded as a classic peak and golden age of North Indian art for all the major religious groups. Although painting was evidently widespread, the surviving works are almost all religious sculpture. The period saw the emergence of the iconic carved stone deity in Hindu art, while the production of the Buddha figure and Jain tirthankara figures continued to expand, the latter often on a very large scale. The traditional main centre of sculpture was Mathura, which continued to flourish, with the art of Gandhara, the centre of Greco-Buddhist art just beyond the northern border of Gupta territory, continuing to exert influence. Other centres emerged during the period, especially at Sarnath. Both Mathura and Sarnath exported sculpture to other parts of northern India.

It is customary to include under "Gupta art" works from areas in north and central India that were not actually under Gupta control, in particular art produced under the Vakataka dynasty, which ruled the Deccan c. 250–510. Their region contained very important sites such as the Ajanta Caves and Elephanta Caves, both mostly created in this period, and the Ellora Caves, which were probably begun then. Also, although the empire lost its western territories by about 500, the artistic style continued to be used across most of northern India until about 550, and arguably around 650. It was then followed by the "Post-Gupta" period, with (to a reducing extent over time) many similar characteristics; Harle ends this around 950. Three main schools of Gupta sculpture are often recognised, based in Mathura, Varanasi/Sarnath, and, to a lesser extent, Nalanda. The distinctively different stones used for sculptures exported from the main centres described below aid identification greatly.

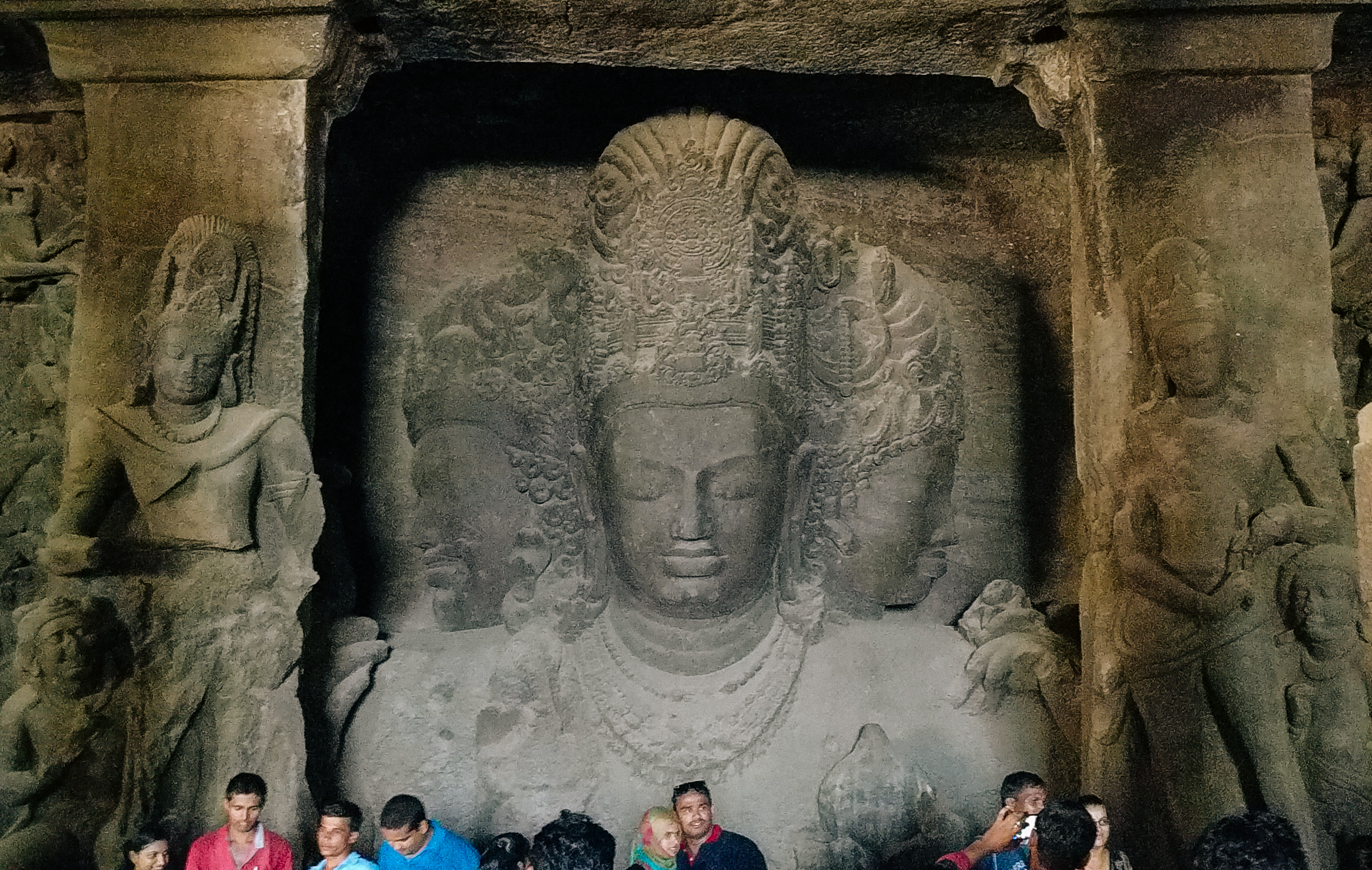
Elephanta Caves, triple-bust (trimurti) of Shiva, 18 feet (5.5 m) tall, c. 550.

Both Buddhist and Hindu sculpture concentrate on large, often near life-size, figures of the major deities, respectively Buddha, Vishnu, and Shiva. The dynasty had a partiality to Vishnu, who now features more prominently, whereas the Kushan imperial family generally had preferred Shiva. Minor figures such as yakshi, which had been very prominent in preceding periods, are now smaller and less frequently represented, and the crowded scenes illustrating Jataka tales of the Buddha's previous lives are rare. When scenes include one of the major figures and other less important ones, there is a great difference in scale, with the major figures many times larger. This is also the case in representations of incidents from the Buddha's life, which earlier had shown all the figures on the same scale.

The lingam was the central murti in most temples. Some new figures appear, including personifications of the Ganges and Yamuna rivers, not yet worshipped, but placed on either side of entrances; these were "the two great rivers encompassing the Gupta heartland". The main bodhisattva appear prominently in sculpture for the first time, as in the paintings at Ajanta. Buddhist, Hindu, and Jain sculpture all show the same style, and there is a "growing likeness of form" between figures from the different religions, which continued after the Gupta period.

The Indian stylistic tradition of representing the body as a series of "smooth, very simplified planes" is continued, though poses, especially in the many standing figures, are subtly tilted and varied, in contrast to the "columnar rigidity" of earlier figures. The detail of facial parts, hair, headgear, jewellery and the halos behind figures are carved very precisely, giving a pleasing contrast with the emphasis on broad swelling masses in the body. Deities of all the religions are shown in a calm and majestic meditative style; "perhaps it is this all-pervading inwardness that accounts for the unequalled Gupta and post-Gupta ability to communicate higher spiritual states".

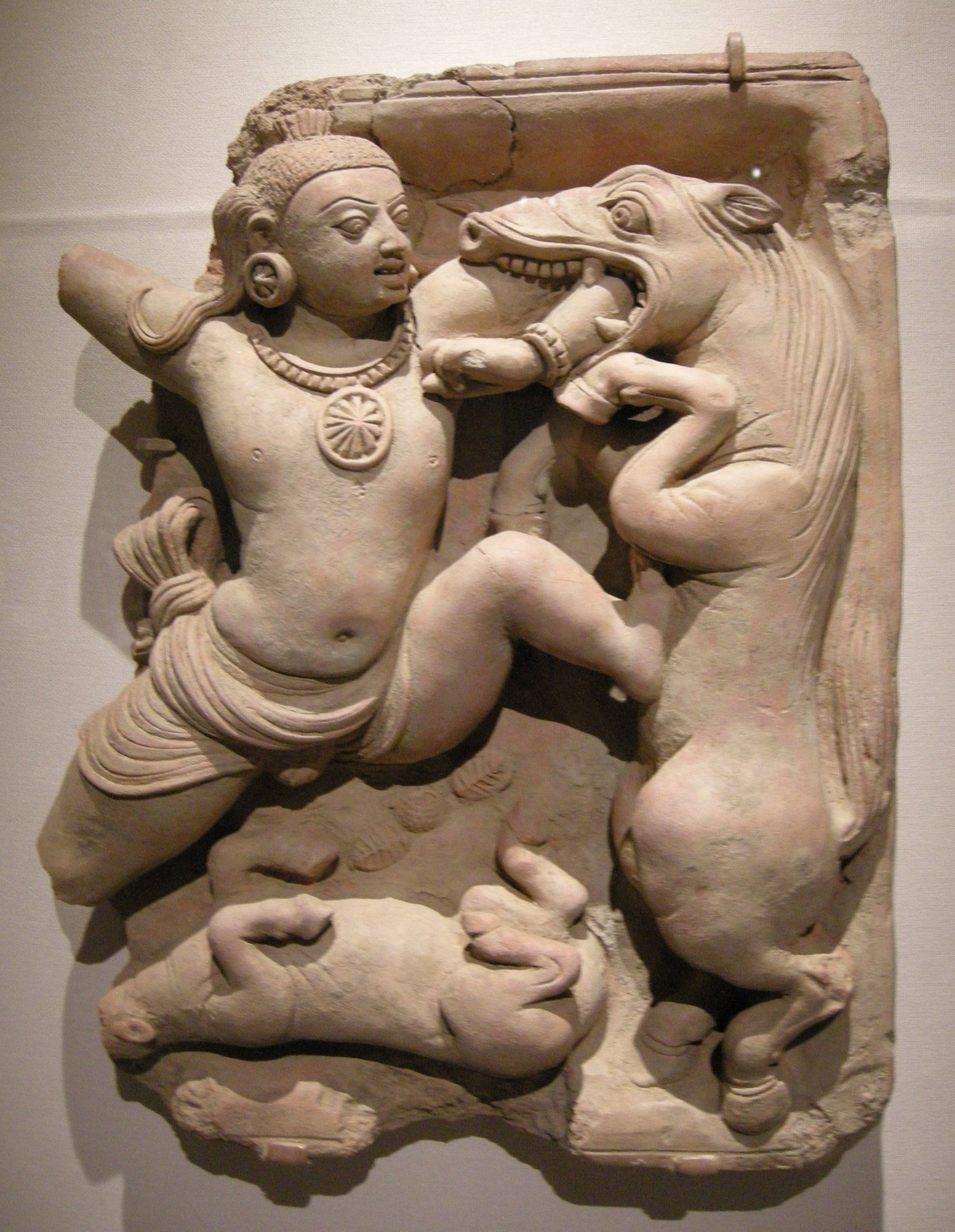
Hindu Gupta terracotta relief, 5th century CE, of Krishna Killing the Horse Demon Keshi

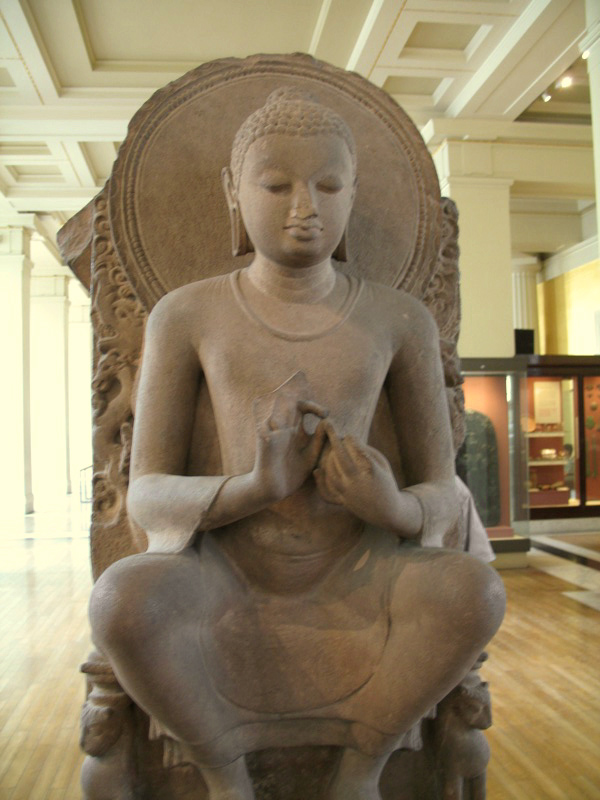
Buddha from Sarnath, 5–6th century CE

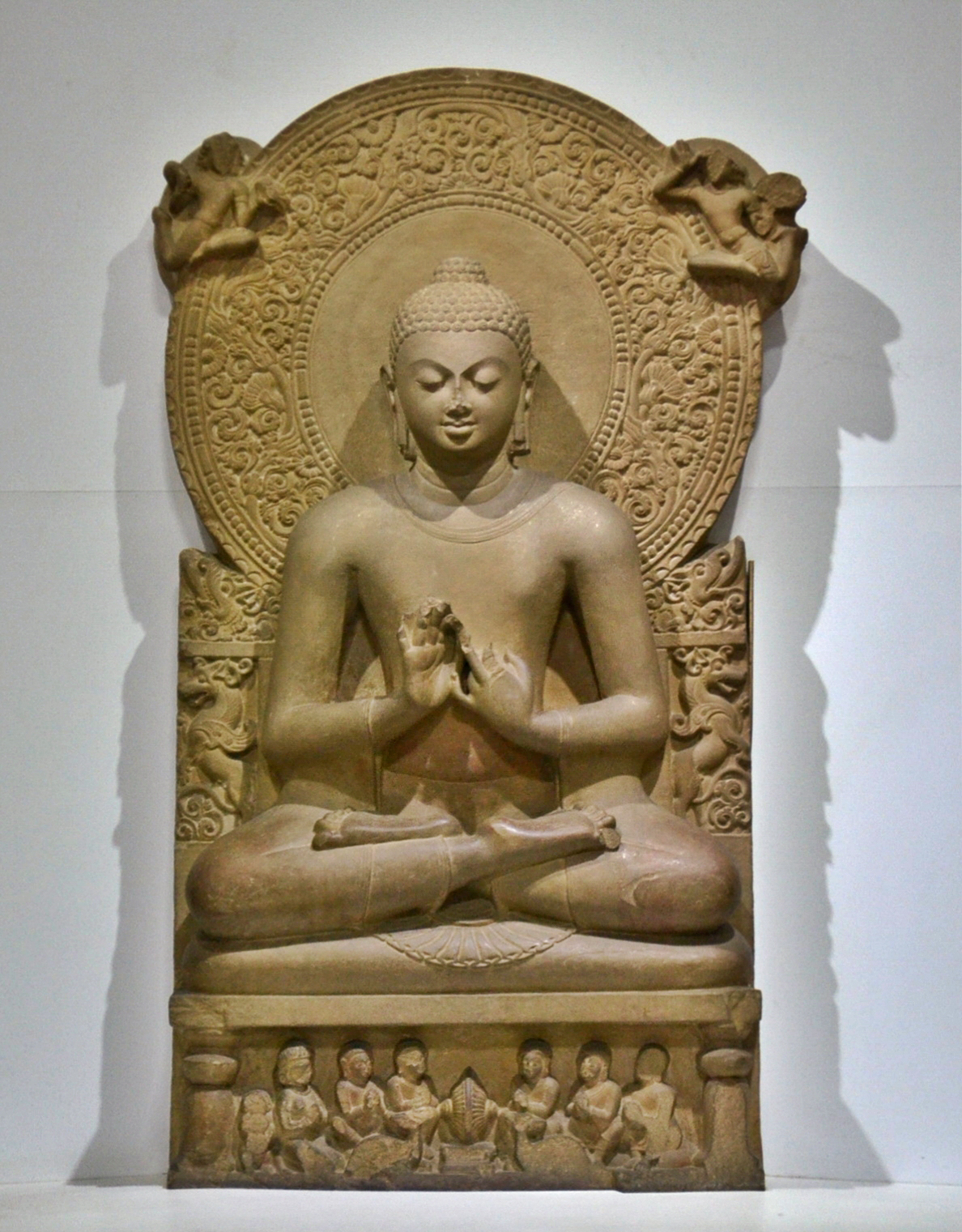
The Dharmachakra Pravartana Buddha at Sarnath, a Gupta statue of the Buddha from Sarnath, Uttar Pradesh, India, last quarter of the 5th century CE.

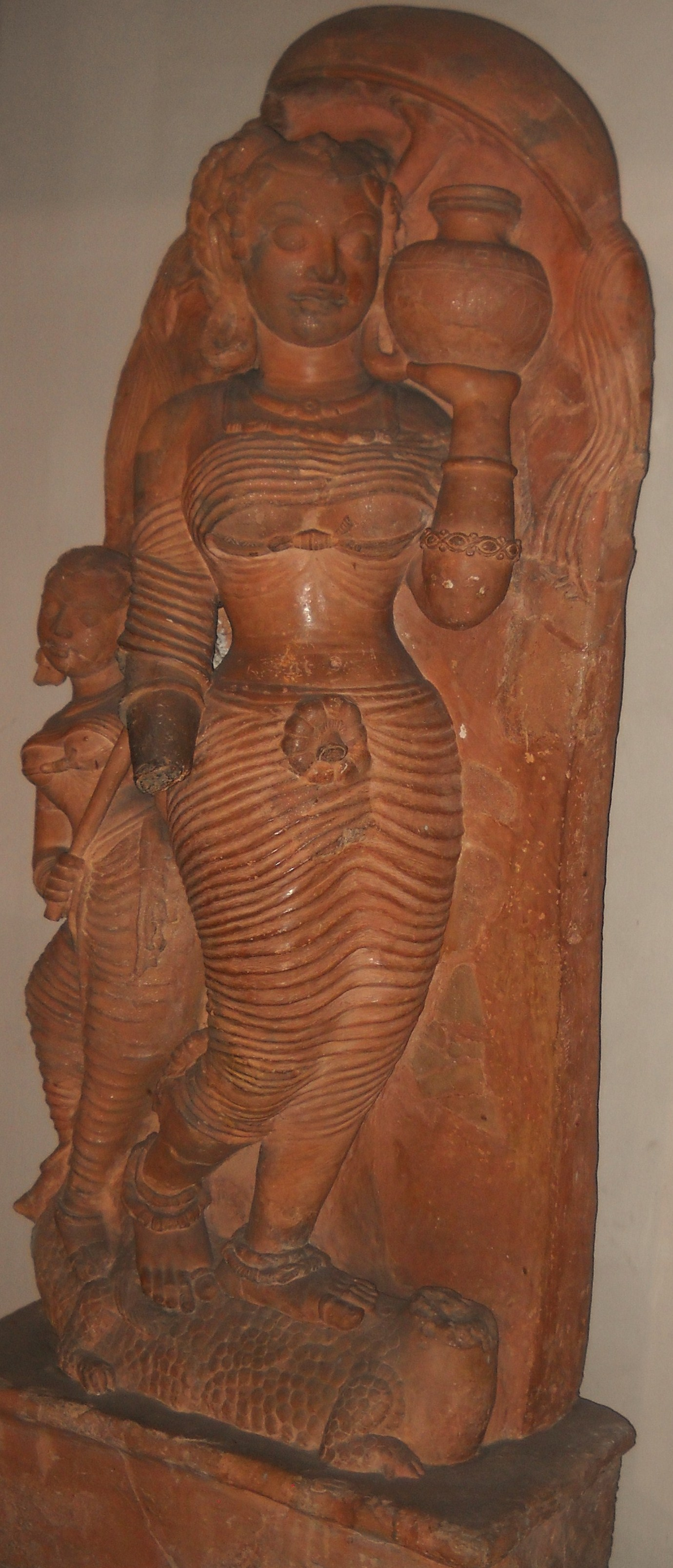
Terracotta Ganges and attendant; 1.47 metres, from Ahichchhatra, 5th-6th century CE

== Medieval and Early Modern ==
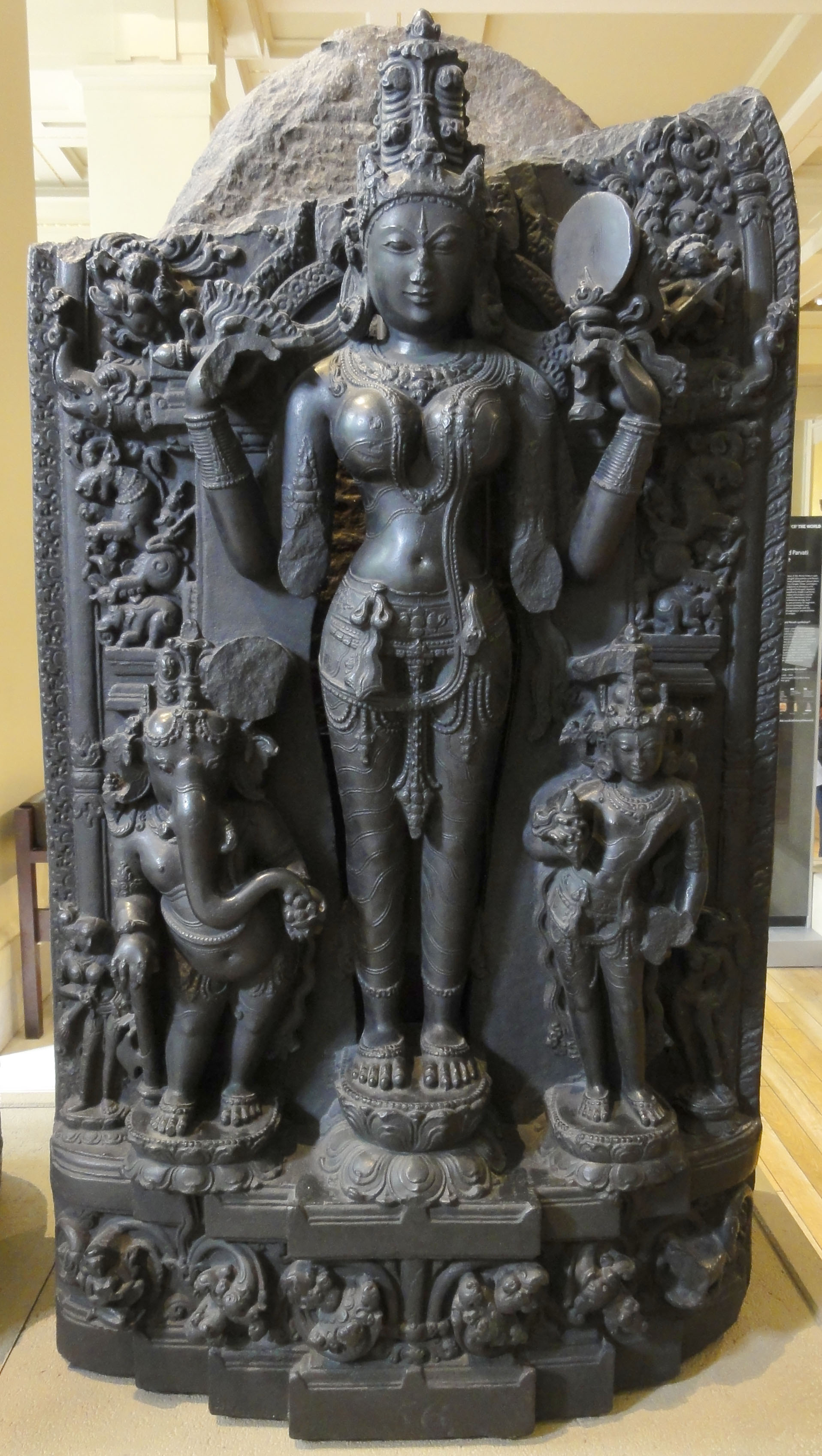
Pala basalt statue of Lalita flanked by Gaṇeśa and Kārttikeya, 11th century

=== Pala and Sena empires ===
The Pala Empire ruled a large area in north and east India between the 8th and 12th centuries CE, mostly later inherited by the Sena Empire. During this time, the style of sculpture changed from "Post-Gupta" to a distinctive style that was widely influential in other areas and later centuries. Deity figures became more rigid in posture, very often standing with straight legs close together, and figures were often heavily loaded with jewellery; they very often have multiple arms, a convention allowing them to hold many attributes and display mudras. The typical form for temple images is a slab with a main figure, rather over half life-size, in very high relief, surrounded by smaller attendant figures, who might have freer tribhanga poses. Critics have found the style tending towards over-elaboration. The quality of the carving is generally very high, with crisp, precise detail. In east India, facial features tend to become sharp.

Though the Pala monarchs are recorded as patronizing religious establishments in a general sense, their patronage of any specific work of art cannot be documented by the surviving evidence, which is mostly inscriptions. However, there are much larger numbers of images that are dated, as compared to other Indian regions and periods, helping greatly the reconstruction of stylistic development.

Much larger numbers of smaller bronze groups of similar composition have survived than from previous periods. Probably the numbers produced were increasing. These were mostly made for domestic shrines of the well-off, and from monasteries. Gradually, Hindu figures come to outnumber Buddhist ones, reflecting the terminal decline of Indian Buddhism, even in east India, its last stronghold.

=== Temples of Khajuraho ===
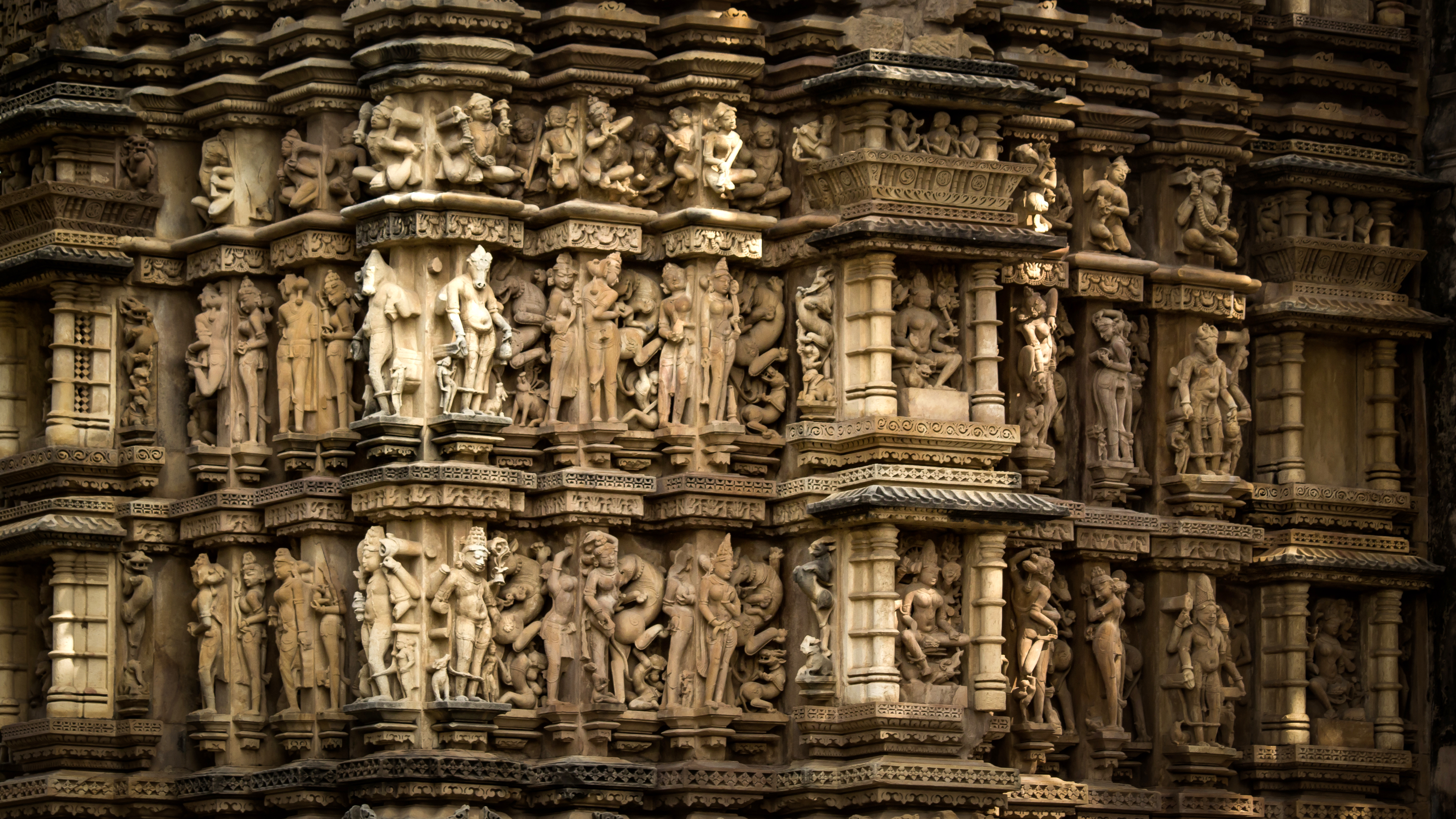
Intricately carved sculptures on the exterior of one of the temples of Khajuraho.

The temples of Khajuraho, a complex of Hindu and Jain temples, were constructed from the 9th to the 11th centuries by the Chandela dynasty. They are considered one of the best examples of Indian art and architecture.

The temples have a rich display of intricately carved sculptures. While they are famous for their erotic sculptures, sexual themes cover less than a tenth of the temple sculpture. The sculptures depict various aspects of everyday life, mythical stories, as well as symbolic displays of various secular and spiritual values important in Hindu tradition.

=== Kalingan Art ===
Kalingan art refers to the distinctive sculptural and architectural style that developed in the region of Kalinga (modern day Odisha and parts of northern Andhra). This artistic tradition flourished between the 7th and 13th centuries CE under the Somavanshi and Eastern Ganga dynasties.

The Kalingan sculpture is noted for its intricate carvings, rhythmic compositions, and refined iconographic detail. Temples such as the Lingaraj Temple, Rajarani Temple, and Konark Sun Temple represent the culminations of this style.

The sculptures typically depict deities of the Hindu pantheon, including Shiva, Vishnu, and Surya, along with celestial beings, apsaras, and scenes from Hindu epics.

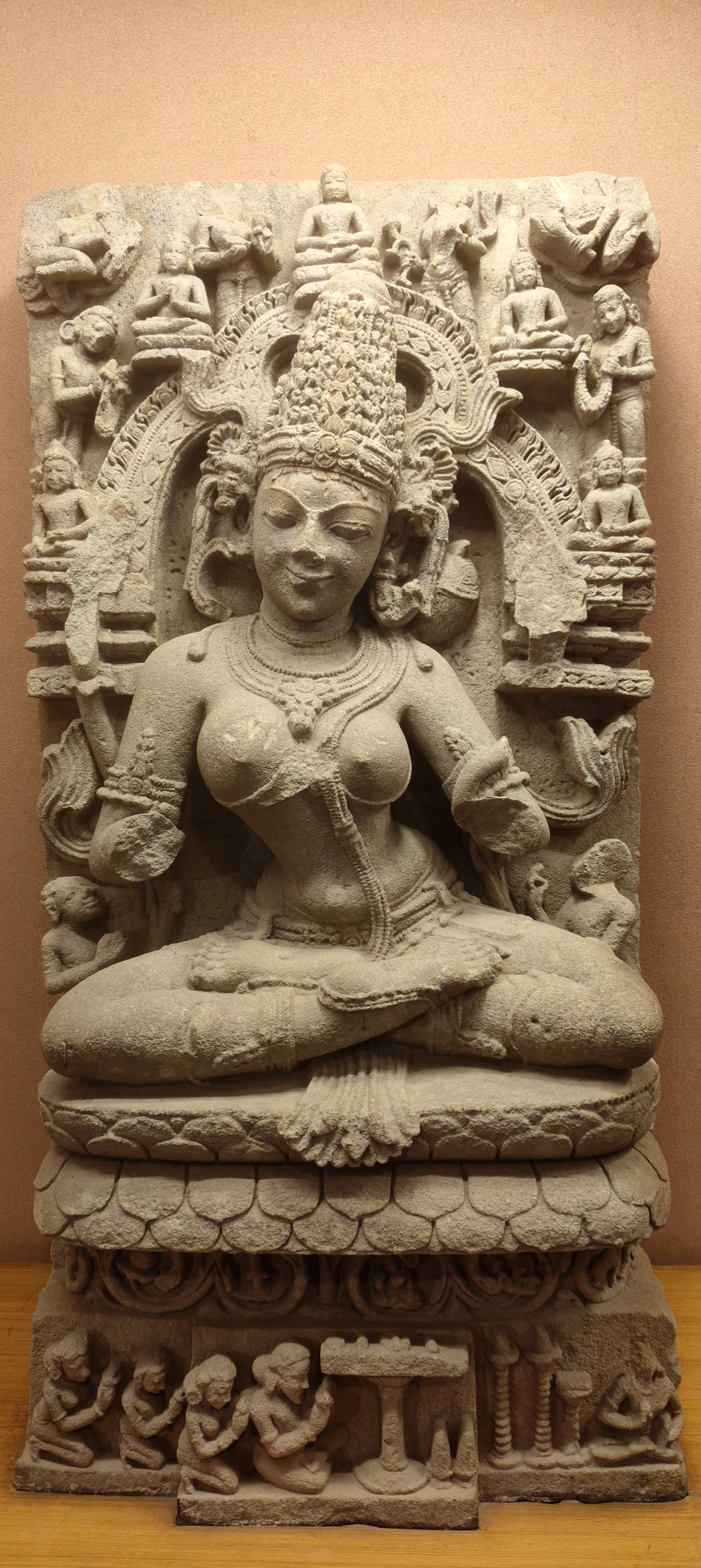
Sculpture of Tara, Odisha

=== Dynasties of South India ===
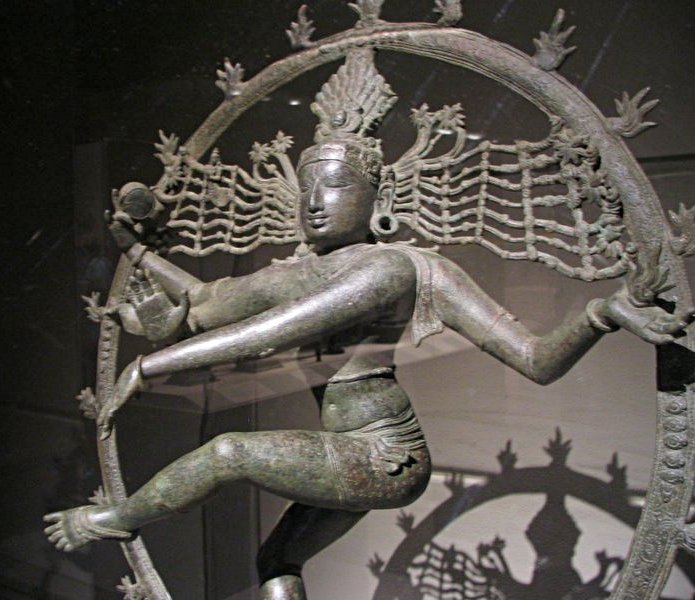
Shiva as Nataraja, Chola period.

After the Gudimallam lingam (see above), the earliest dynasty of southern India to leave stone sculpture on a large scale was the long-lasting Pallava dynasty, which ruled much of south-east India between 275 and 897, although the major sculptural projects come from the later part of the period. A number of significant Hindu temples survive, with rich sculptural decoration. Initially these tend to be rock-cut, as are most of the Group of Monuments at Mahabalipuram (7th and 8th centuries), perhaps the best-known examples of Pallava art and architecture. Many of these exploit natural outcrops of rock, which are carved away on all sides until a building is left. Others, like the Shore Temple, are constructed in the usual way, and others are cut into a rock face like most other rock-cut architecture. The Descent of the Ganges at Mahabalipuram, is "the largest and most elaborate sculptural composition in India", a relief carved on a near-vertical rock face some 29 metres (86 feet) wide, featuring hundreds of figures, including a life-size elephant (late 7th century).

Other Pallava temples with sculpture surviving in good condition are the Kailasanathar Temple, Vaikunta Perumal Temple, and others at Kanchipuram, and the cave temples at Mamandur. The Pallava style in stone reliefs is influenced by the hardness of the stone mostly used; the relief is less deep, and detail such as jewellery minimized, compared to further north. The figures are more slender and "delicately built and project sweetness and unmannered delicacy and refinement"; much the same figure type is continued in Chola sculpture in both stone and bronze. In large narrative panels, some of the subjects are distinctively Tamil, such as Korravai (Durga as goddess of victory), and Somaskanda, a seated family group of Shiva, his consort Parvati, and Skanda (Murugan) as a child.

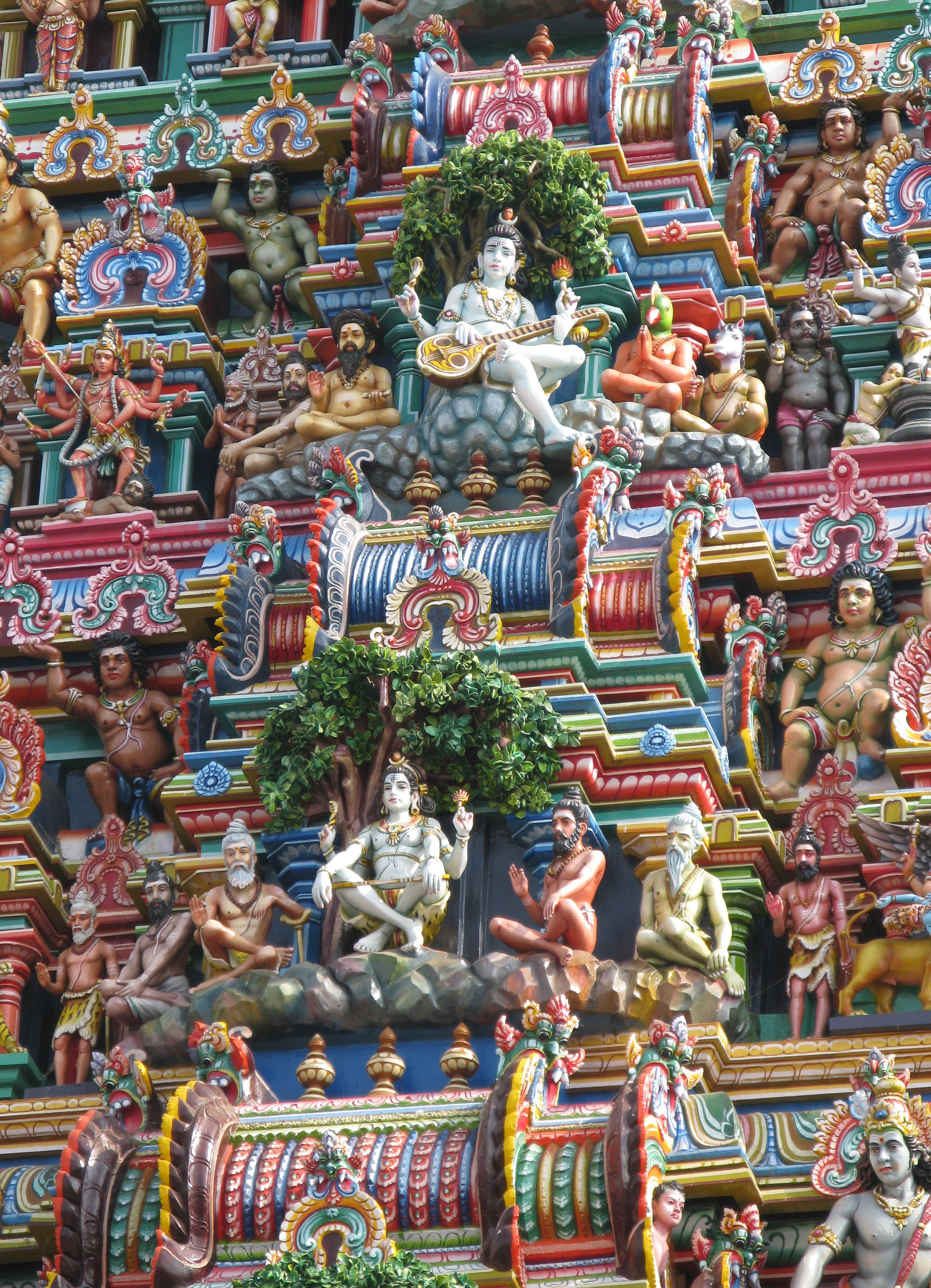
Gopuram of the Kapaleeshwarar Temple, Tamil Nadu, densely packed with rows of painted plaster figures, 1906.

The "imperial" Chola dynasty begins about 850, controlling much of the south, with a slow decline from about 1150. Large numbers of temples were constructed, which mostly suffered far less from Muslim destruction than those further north. These were heavily decorated with stone relief sculpture, both large narrative panels and single figures, mostly in niches on the outside. The Pallava style was broadly continued.

Chola bronzes, the largest mostly about half life-size, are some of the most iconic and famous sculptures of India, using a similar elegant but powerful style to the stone pieces. They were created using the lost wax technique. The sculptures were of Shiva in various avatars with his consort Parvati, and Vishnu with his consort Lakshmi, among other deities. Even large bronzes had the advantage that they were light enough to be used in processions for festivals.

The most iconic among these is the bronze figure of Shiva as Nataraja, the lord of dance. In his upper right hand he holds the damaru, the drum of creation. In his upper left hand he holds the agni, the flame of destruction. His lower right hand is lifted in the gesture of the abhaya mudra. His right foot stands upon the demon Apasmara, the embodiment of ignorance.

The Vijayanagara Empire was the last major Hindu empire, constructing very large temples at Hampi, the capital, of which much remains in generally good condition, despite the Mughal army spending a year destroying the city after its fall. Temples are often highly decorated, in a style that further elaborates the late Chola style, and were influential for later South Indian temples. Rows of horses rearing out from columns became a favourite and spectacular device. By the end of the period, hugely expanded multi-storey gopurams had become the most prominent feature of temples, as they have remained in the major temples of the south. The large numbers of figures on these were now mostly made from brightly painted stucco.

== British Colonial period ==
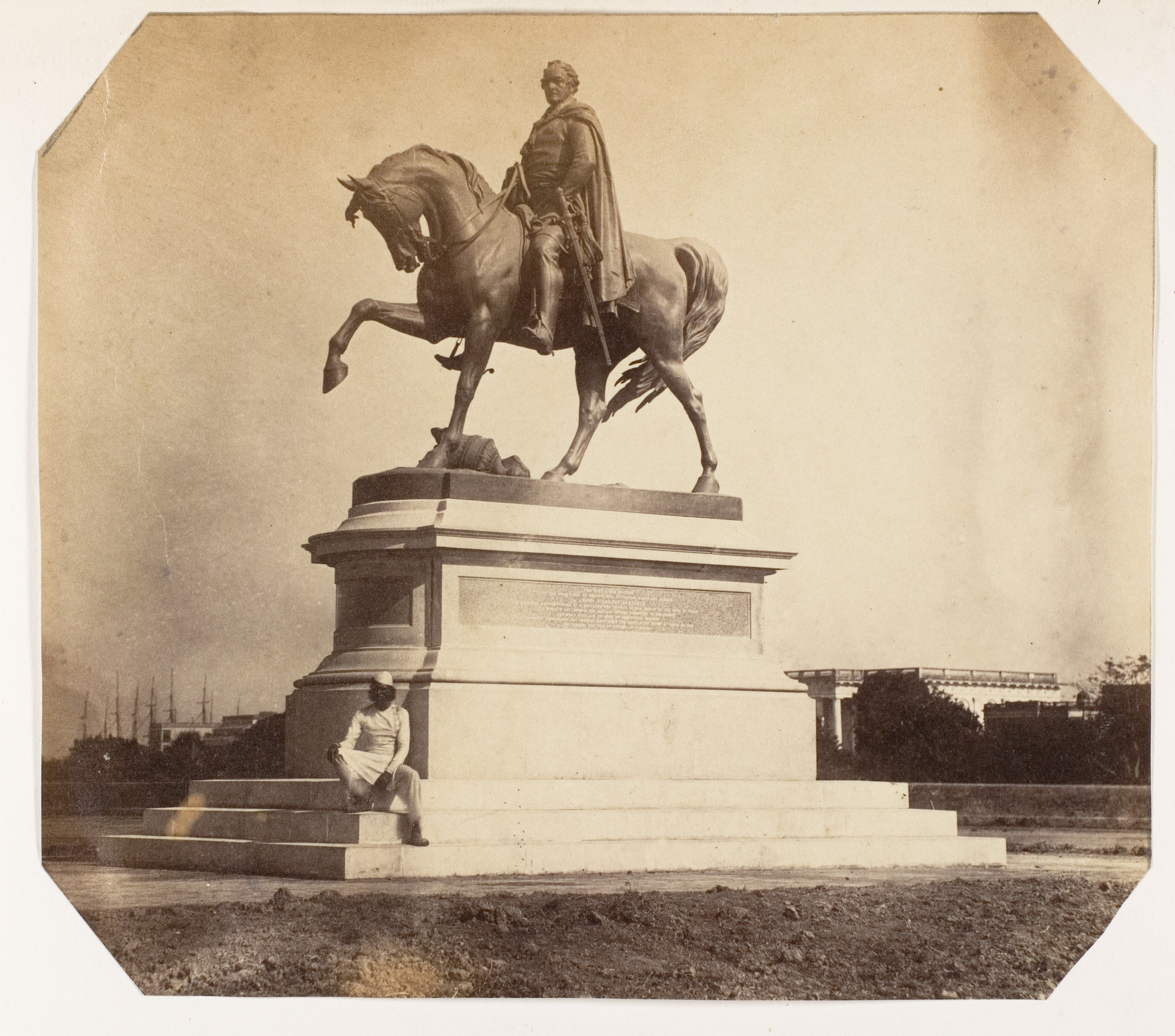
The Statue of Henry Hardinge, Governor-General of India

During this period, European-styled statues were erected in city squares as monuments to the British Empire's power. Statues of Queen Victoria, George V, and various governors-general of India were erected. Such statues were removed from public places after independence and placed within museums. However, some still stand at their original location, such as the Statue of Queen Victoria, Bangalore.

== Post-independence ==
Modern Indian sculptors include D. P. Roy Choudhury, Ramkinkar Baij, Pilloo Pochkhanawala, Mrinalini Mukherjee, Adi Davierwala, Sankho Chaudhuri, and Chintamoni Kar. The National Gallery of Modern Art has a large collection of modern Indian sculpture. Contemporary Indian sculptors include Sudarshan Shetty, Ranjini Shettar, Anita Dube, and Rajeshree Goody.

== Gallery ==
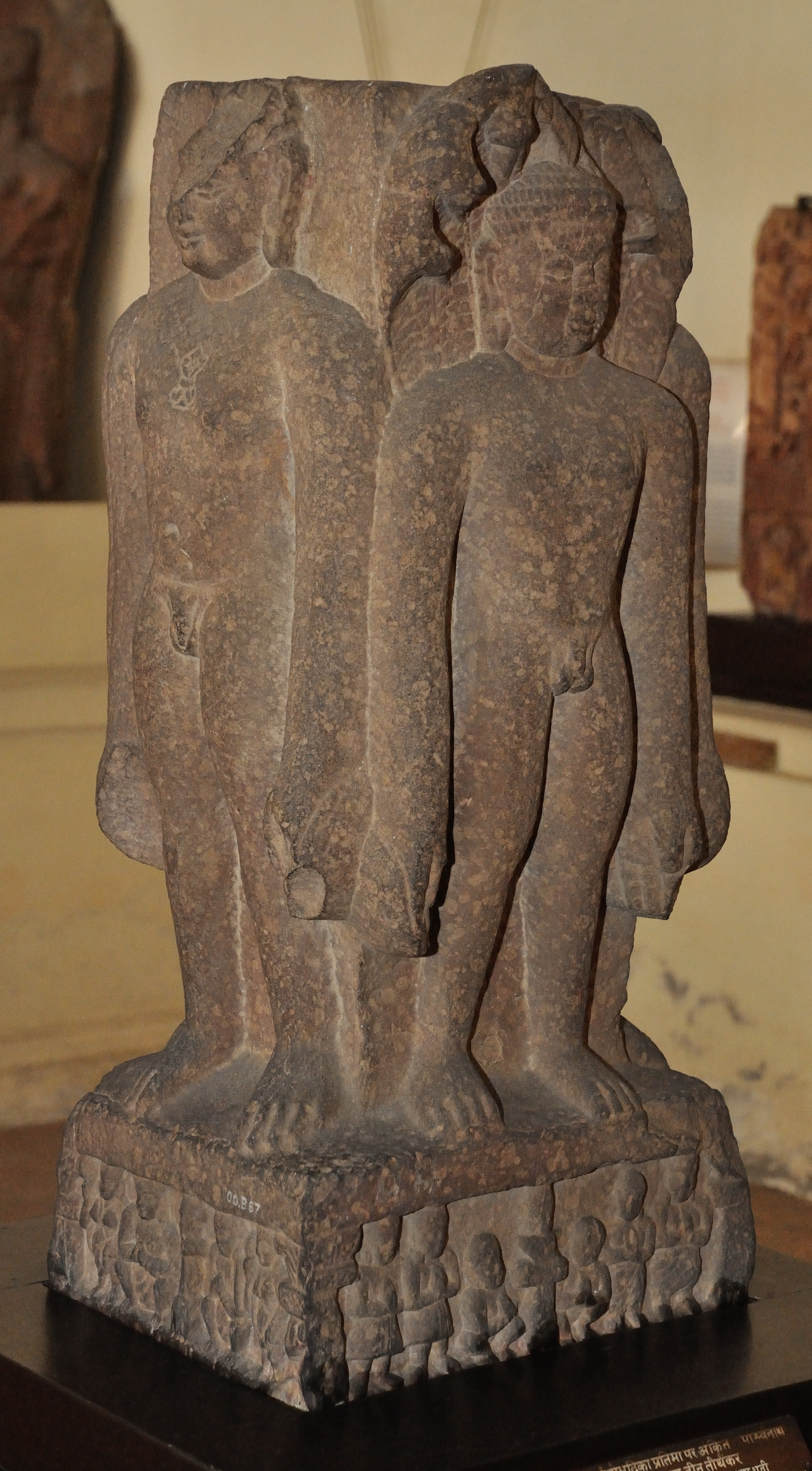
Jain chaumukha sculpture, 1st century CE

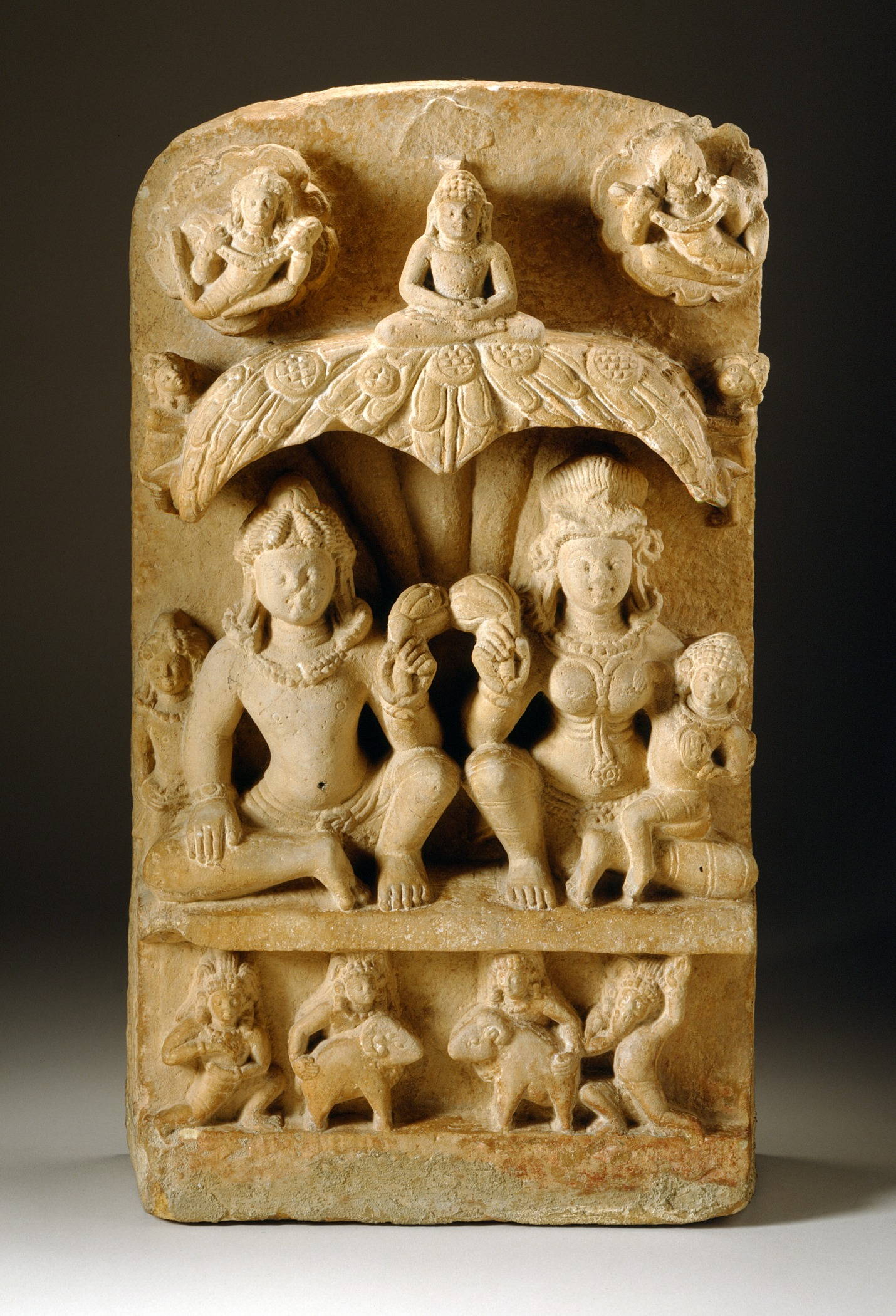
'A Jain Family Group' sculpture, Los Angeles County Museum of Art, 6th century

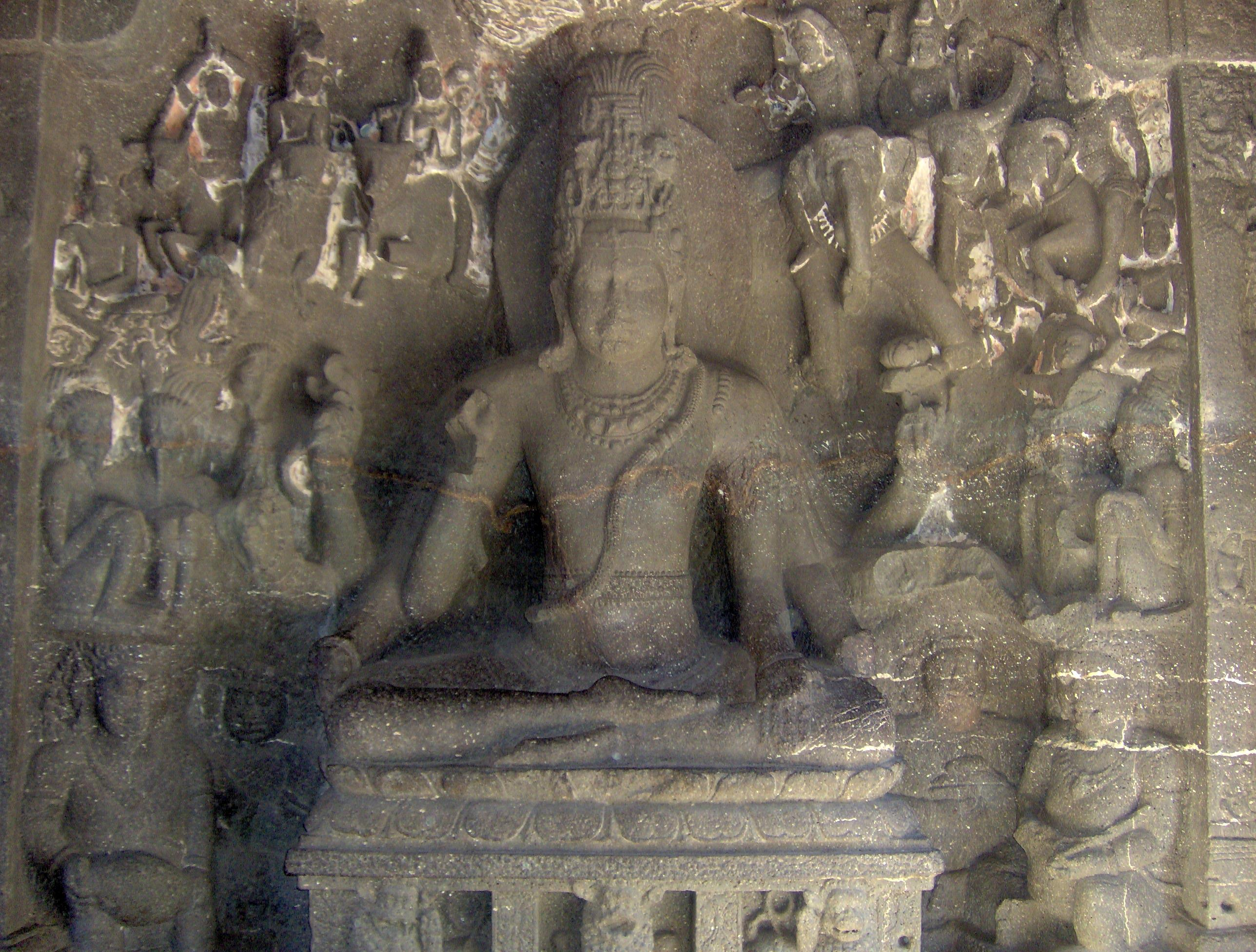
Shiva panel, Kailash Temple (Cave 16), Ellora.

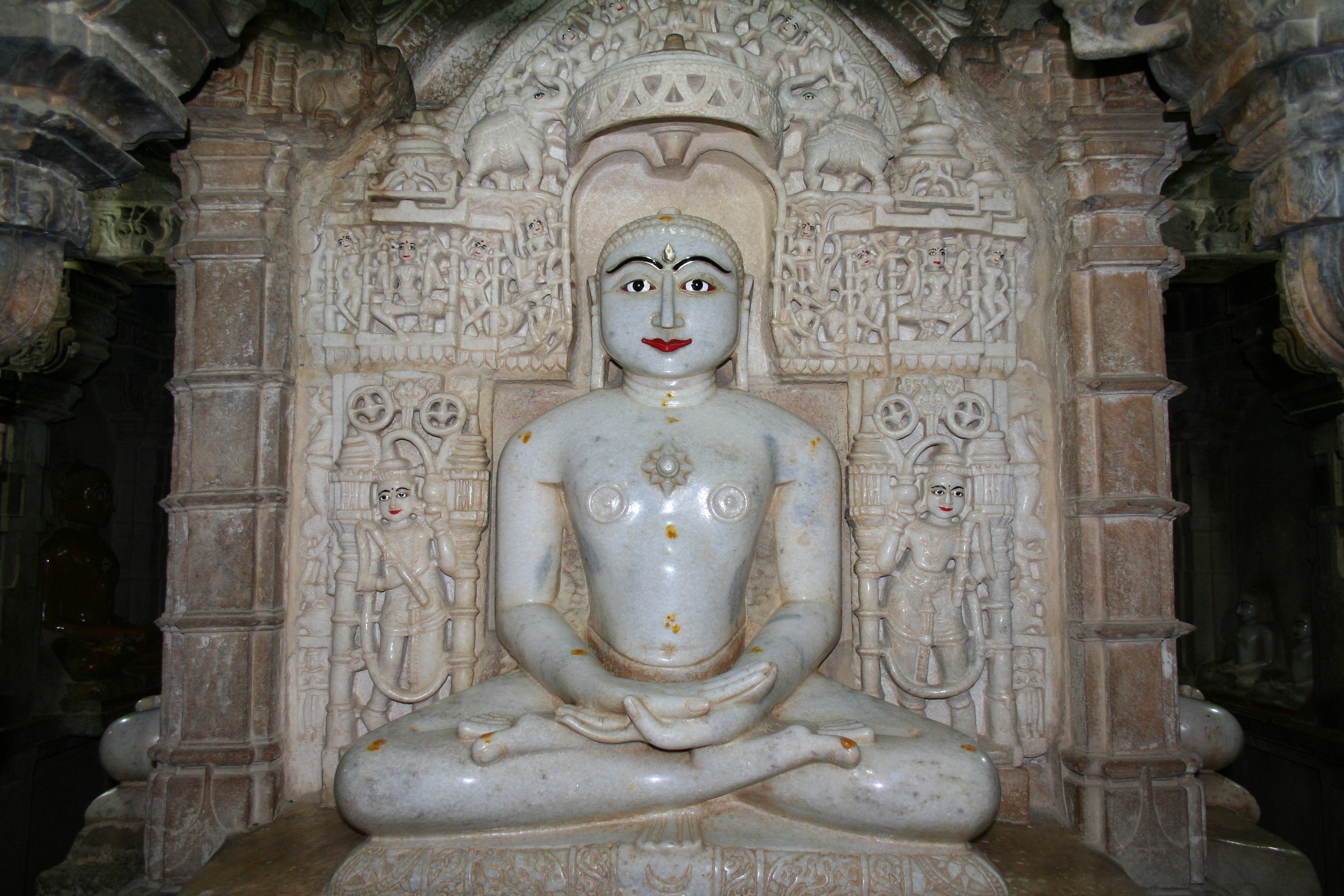
Marble figure, Jaisalmer Jain Temple, Rajasthan, 12th Century

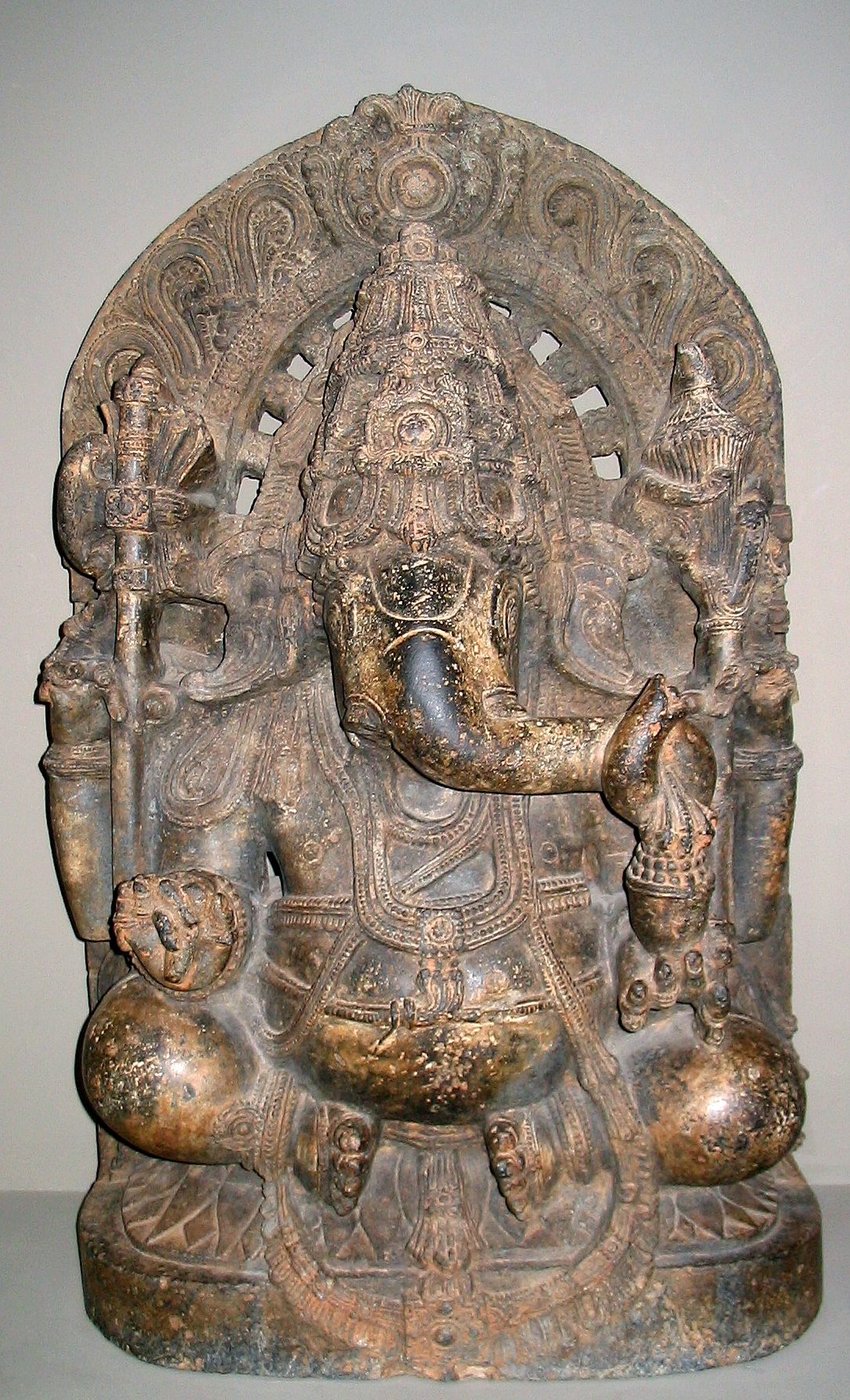
13th century Ganesha statue

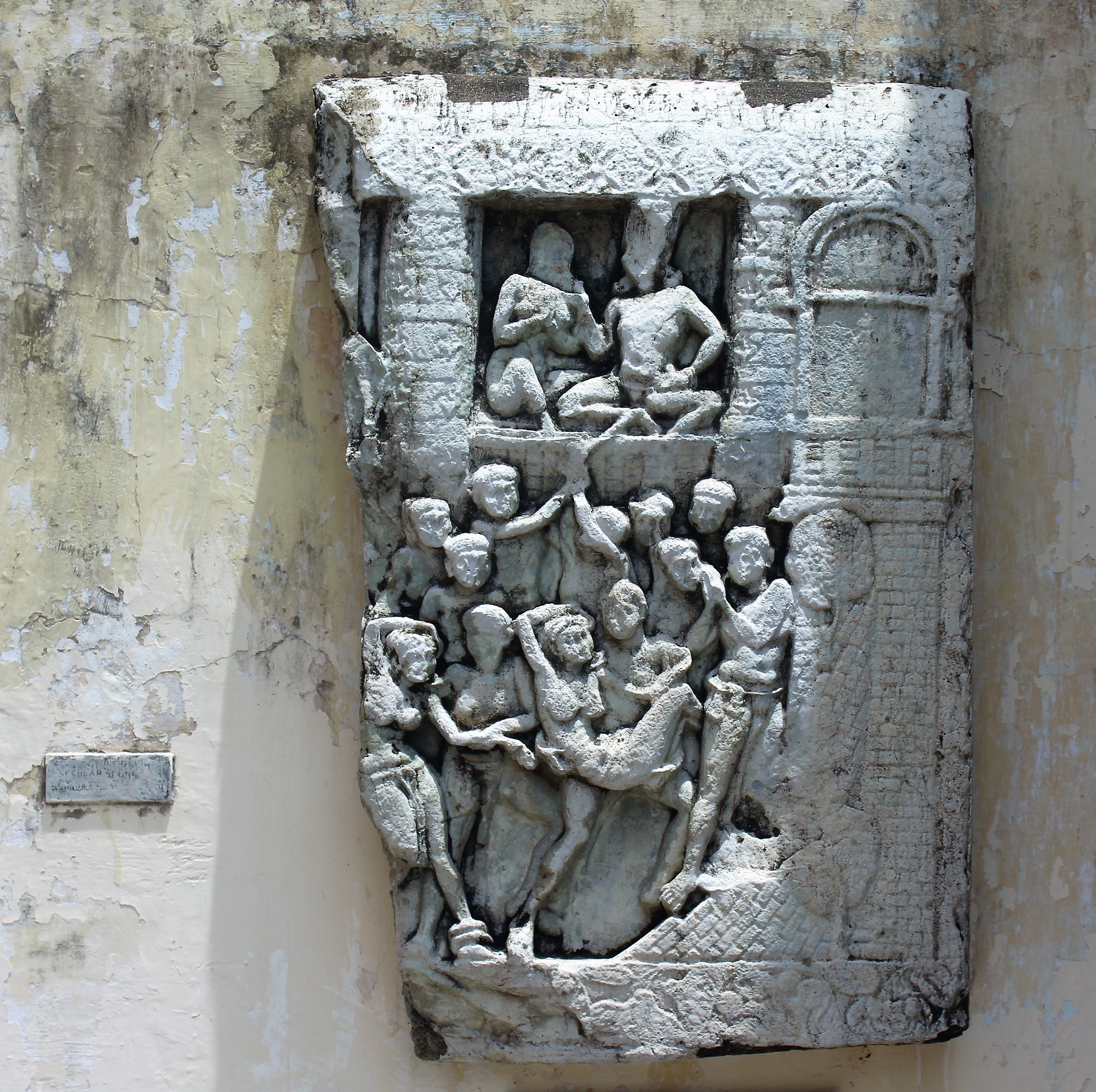
Stone Inscription at ASI Museum, Amaravathi

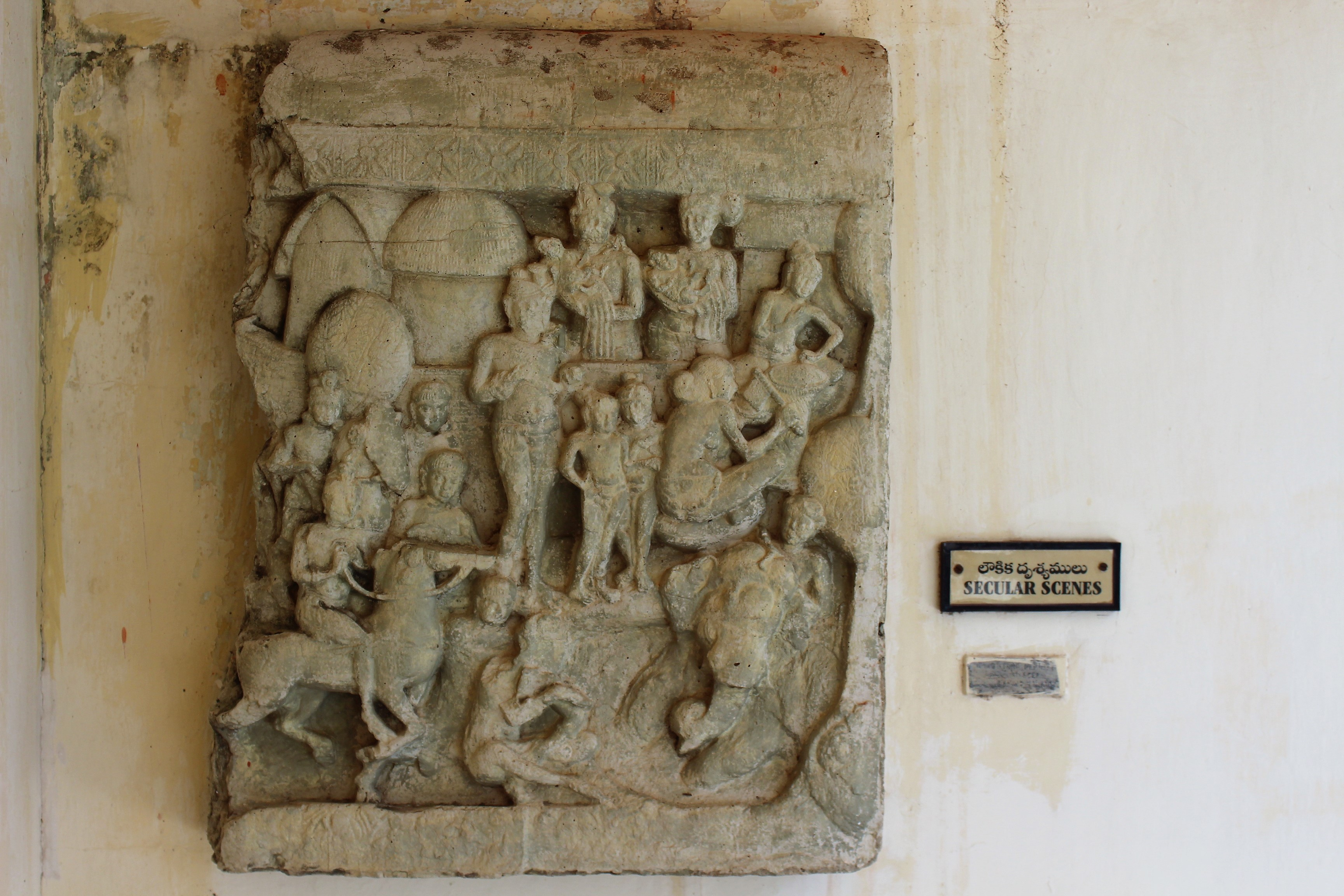
Secular scenes

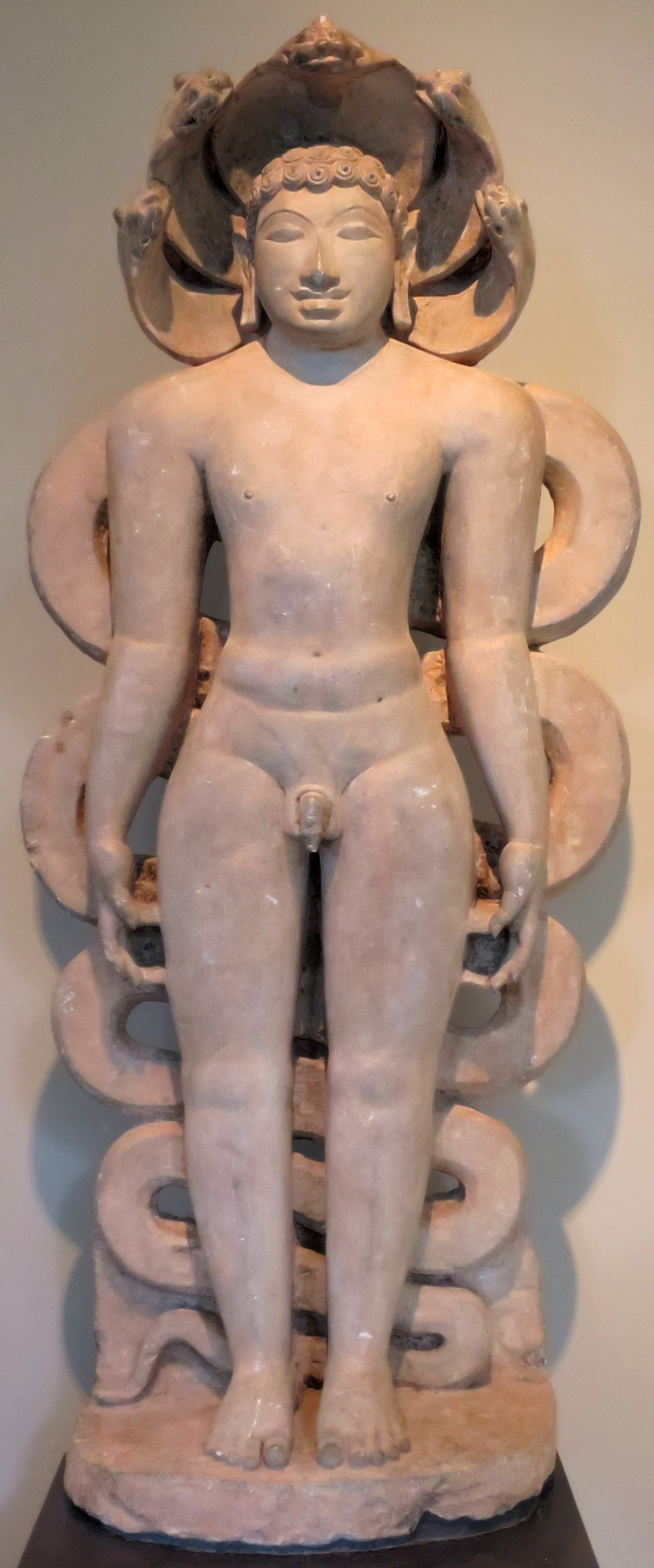
Statue of Suparshvanatha from c. 900 C.E.

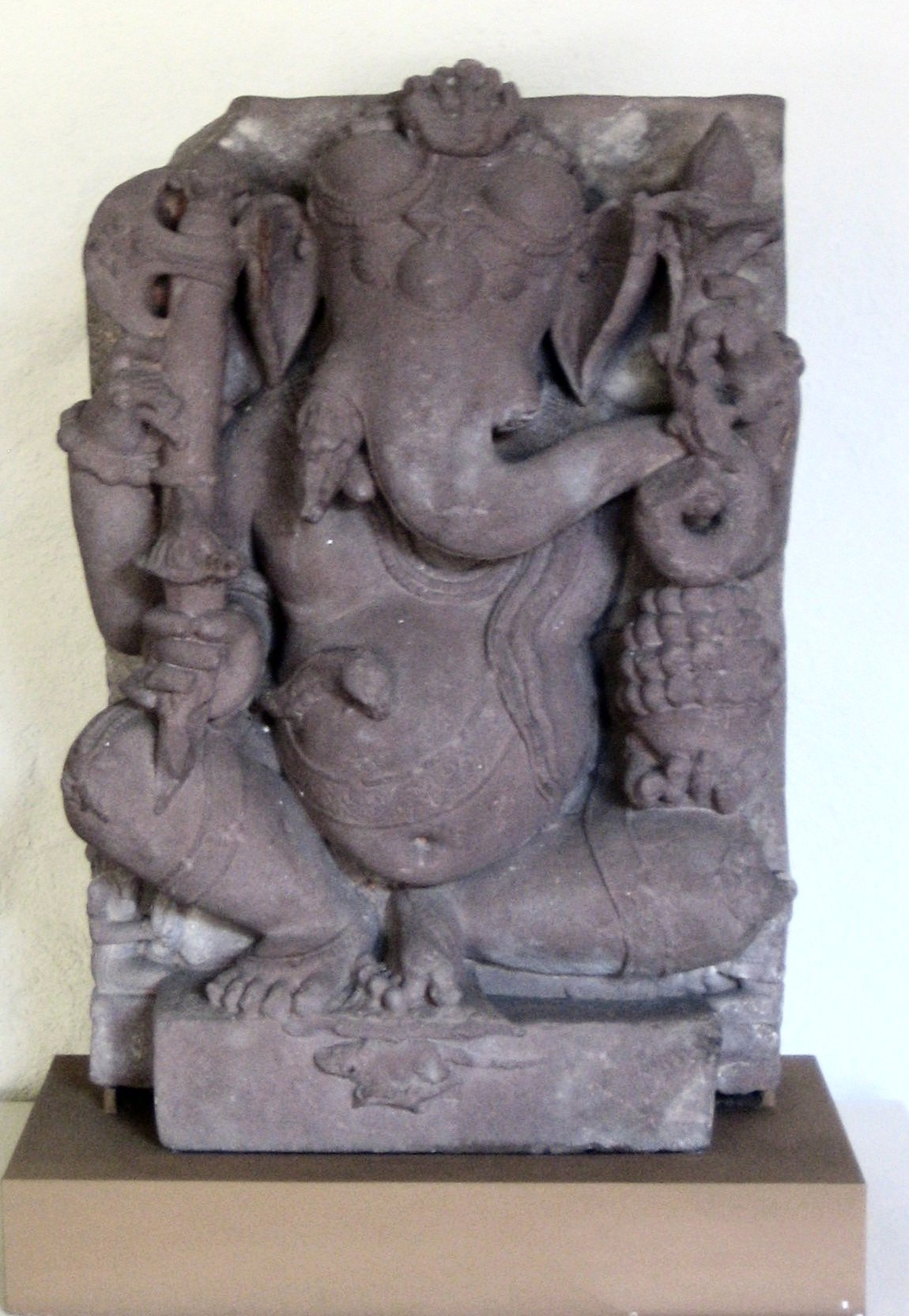
Seated Ganesha, sandstone sculpture from Rajasthan, 9th century

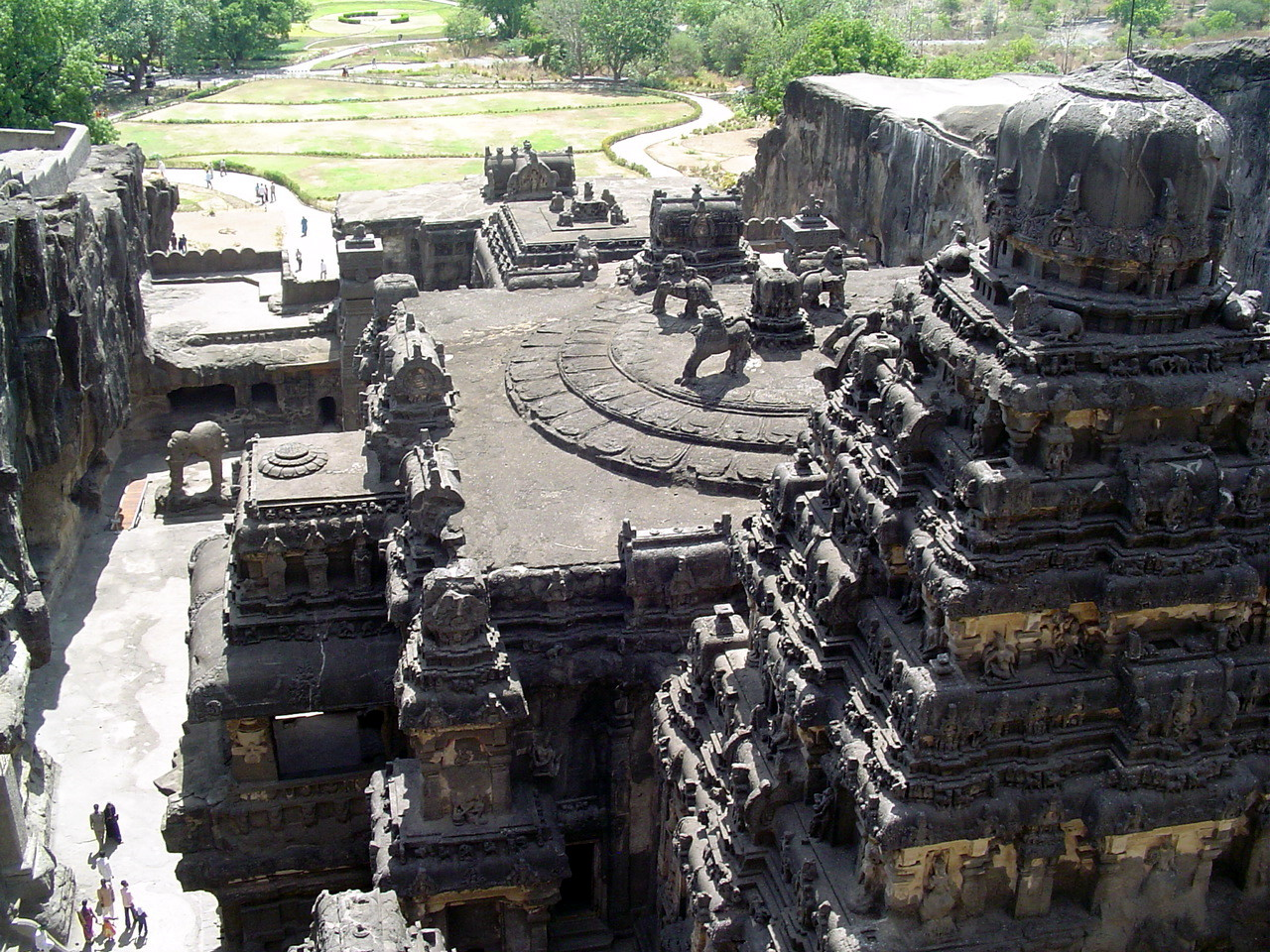
Kailasha Temple at Ellora Cave

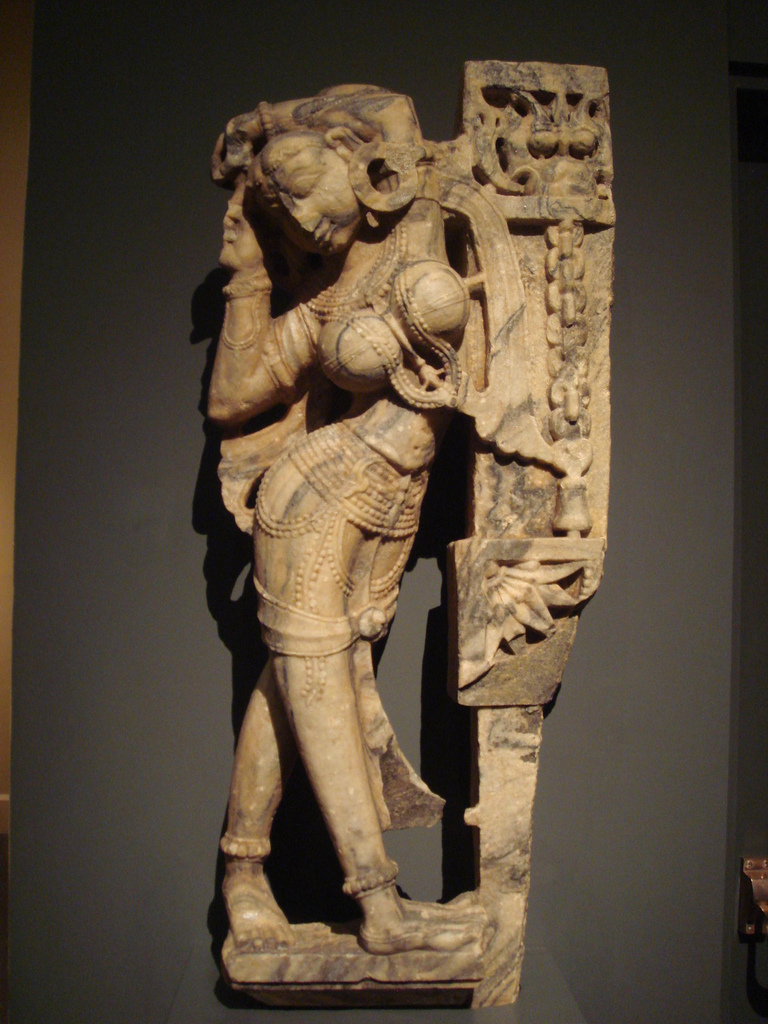
Marble Sculpture of female yakshi in typical curving pose, c. 1450, Rajasthan

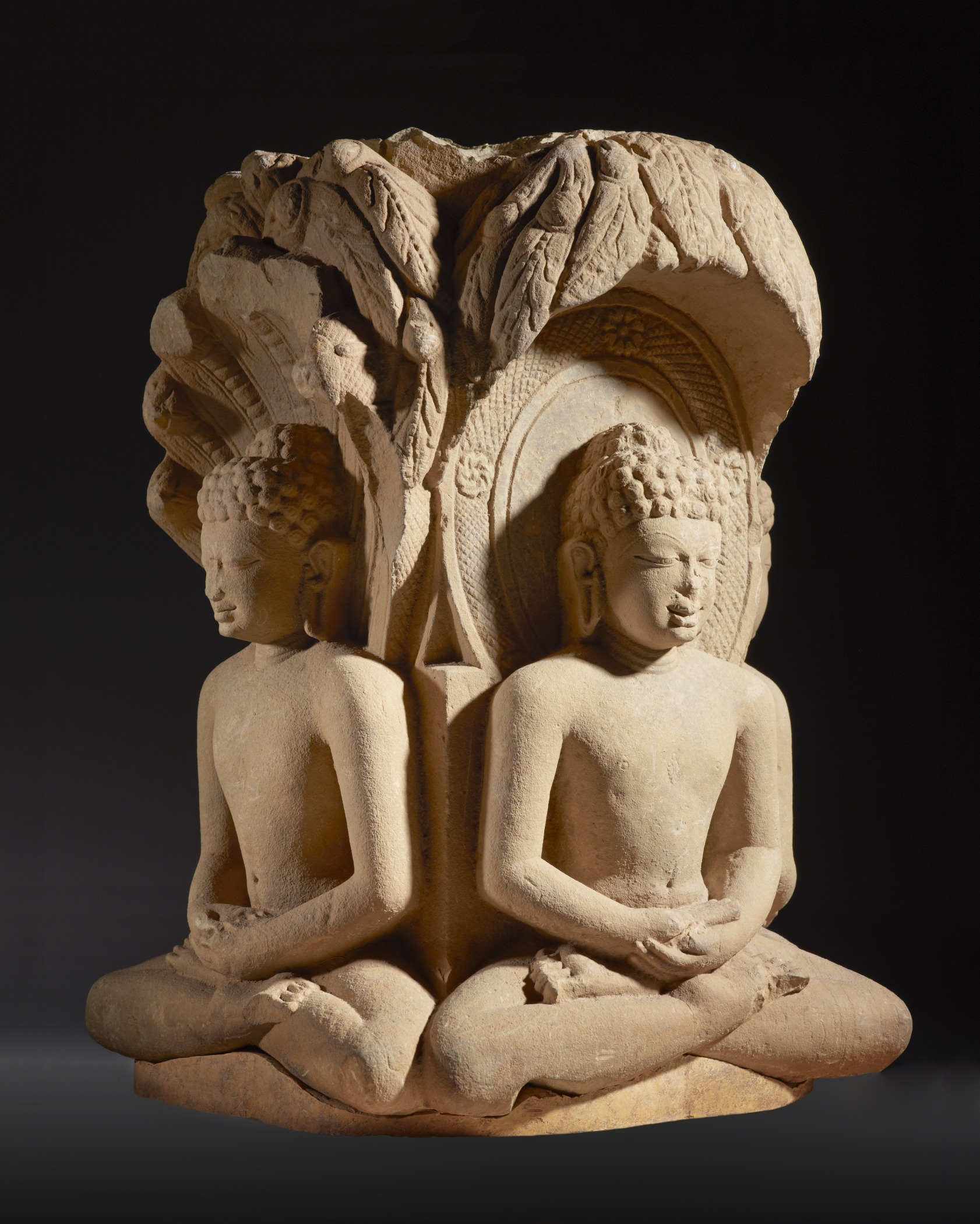
Shrine with Four Jinas-Rishabhanatha, Parshvanatha, Neminatha, and Mahavira, 6th century

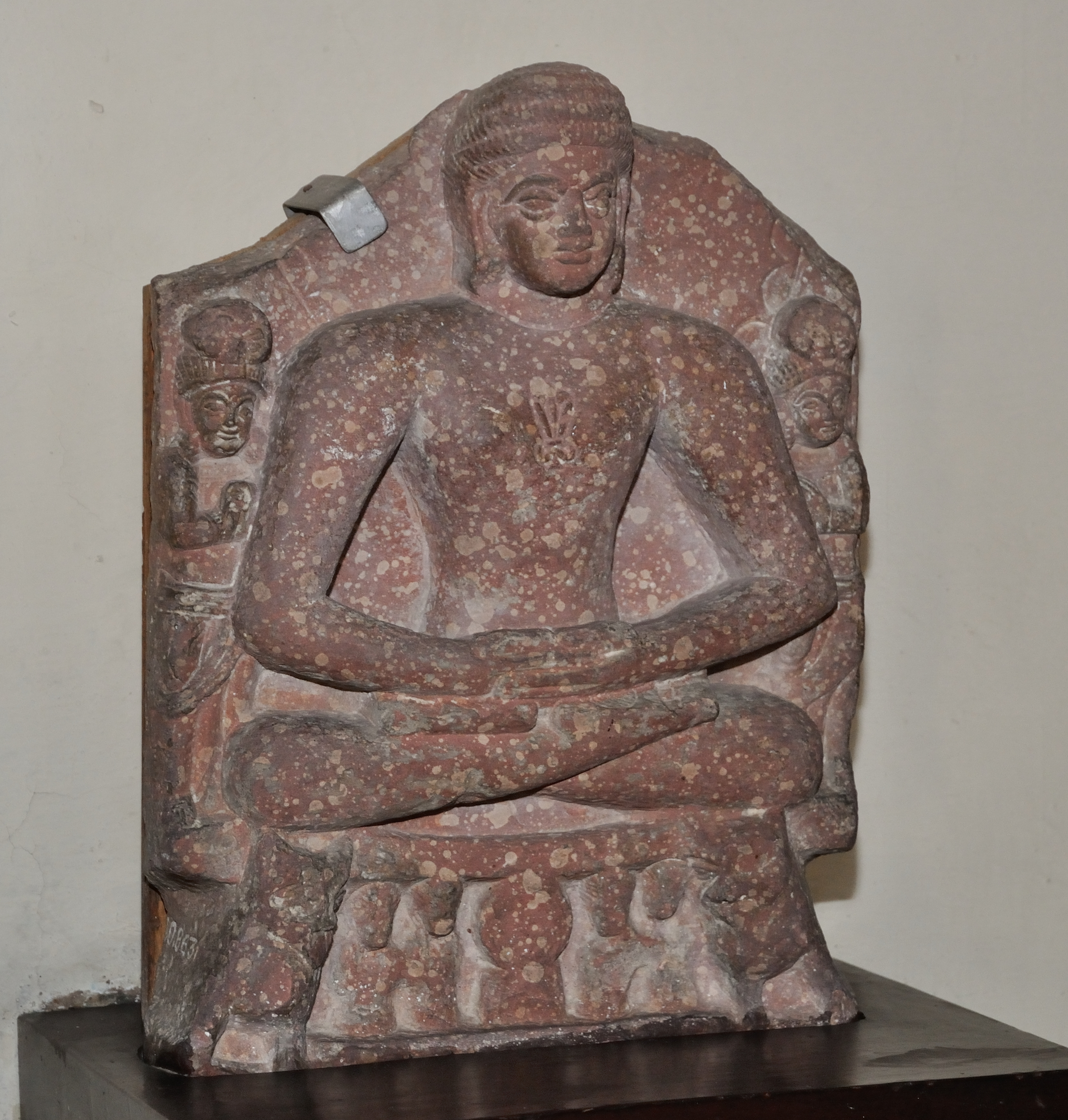
Jain tirthankara, Kushan Empire, 1st-2nd century

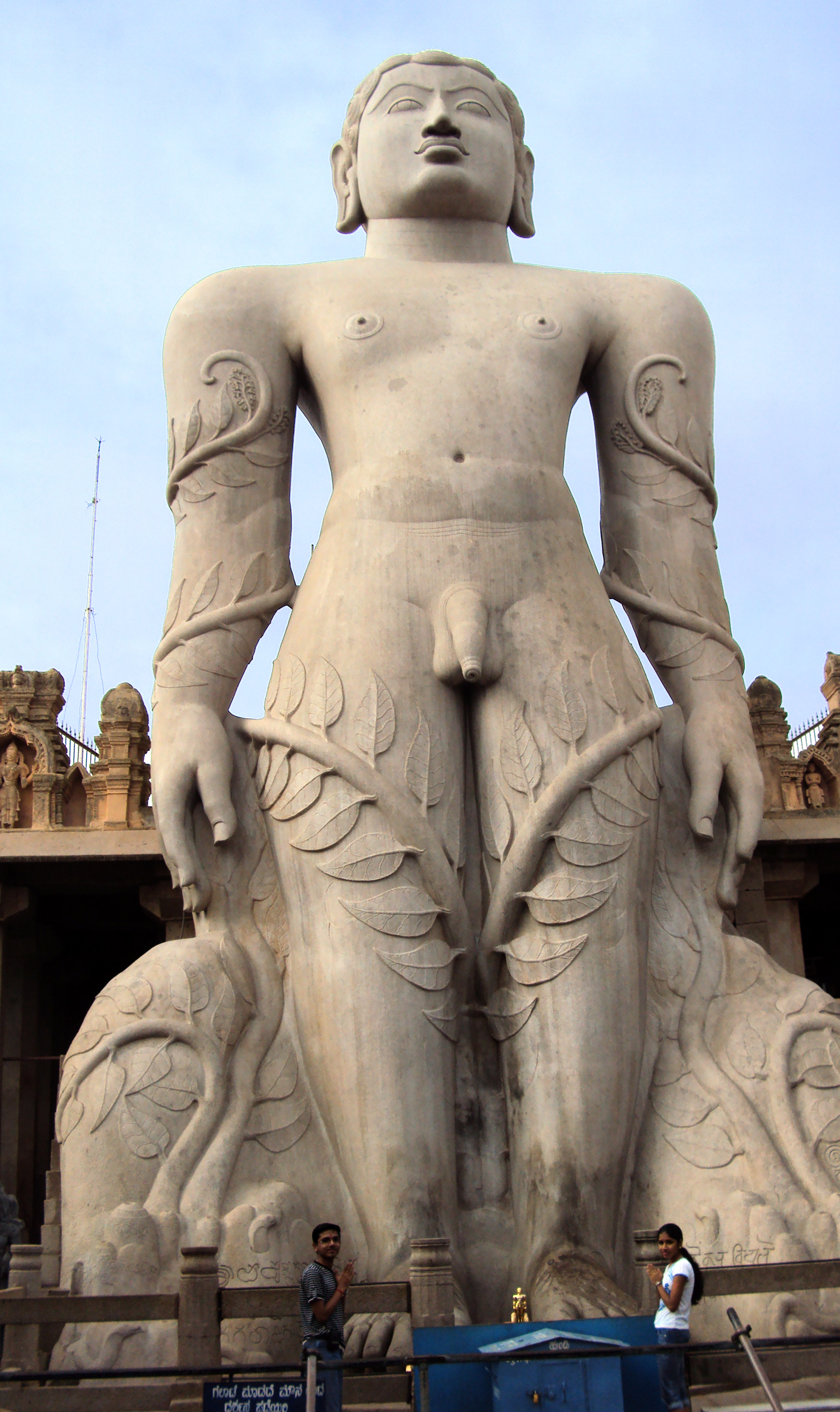
The iconic 57 ft high monolithic Statue of Gommateshwara, Shravanabelagola, 10th Century

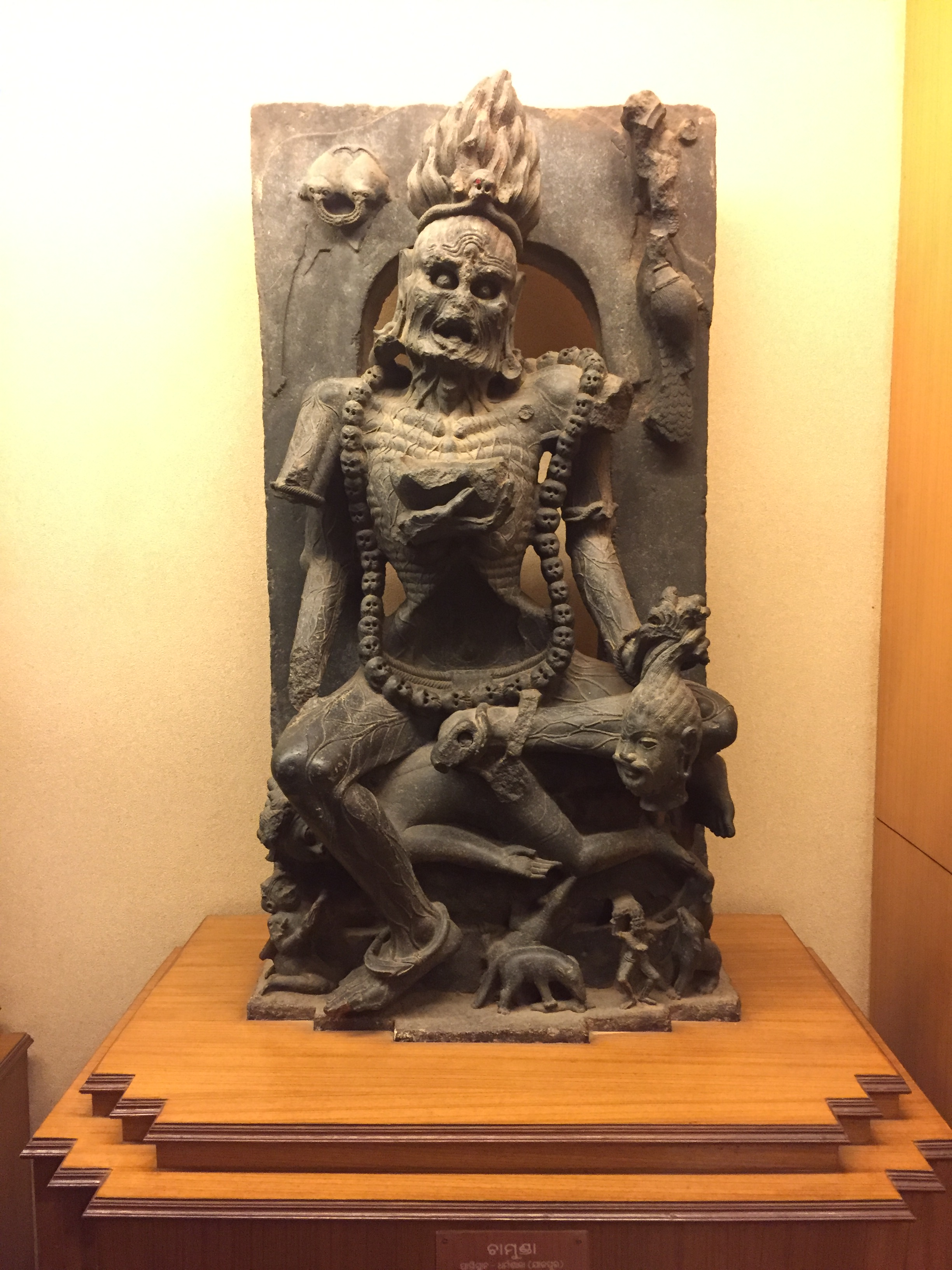
Chamunda sculpture 8th century CE, Jajpur, Odisha

== See also ==
- Sculpture of Bangladesh
- List of rock-cut temples in India
- List of the tallest statues in India
