= Raymond A. Whyte =

Mid 20th Century Surrealist Artist

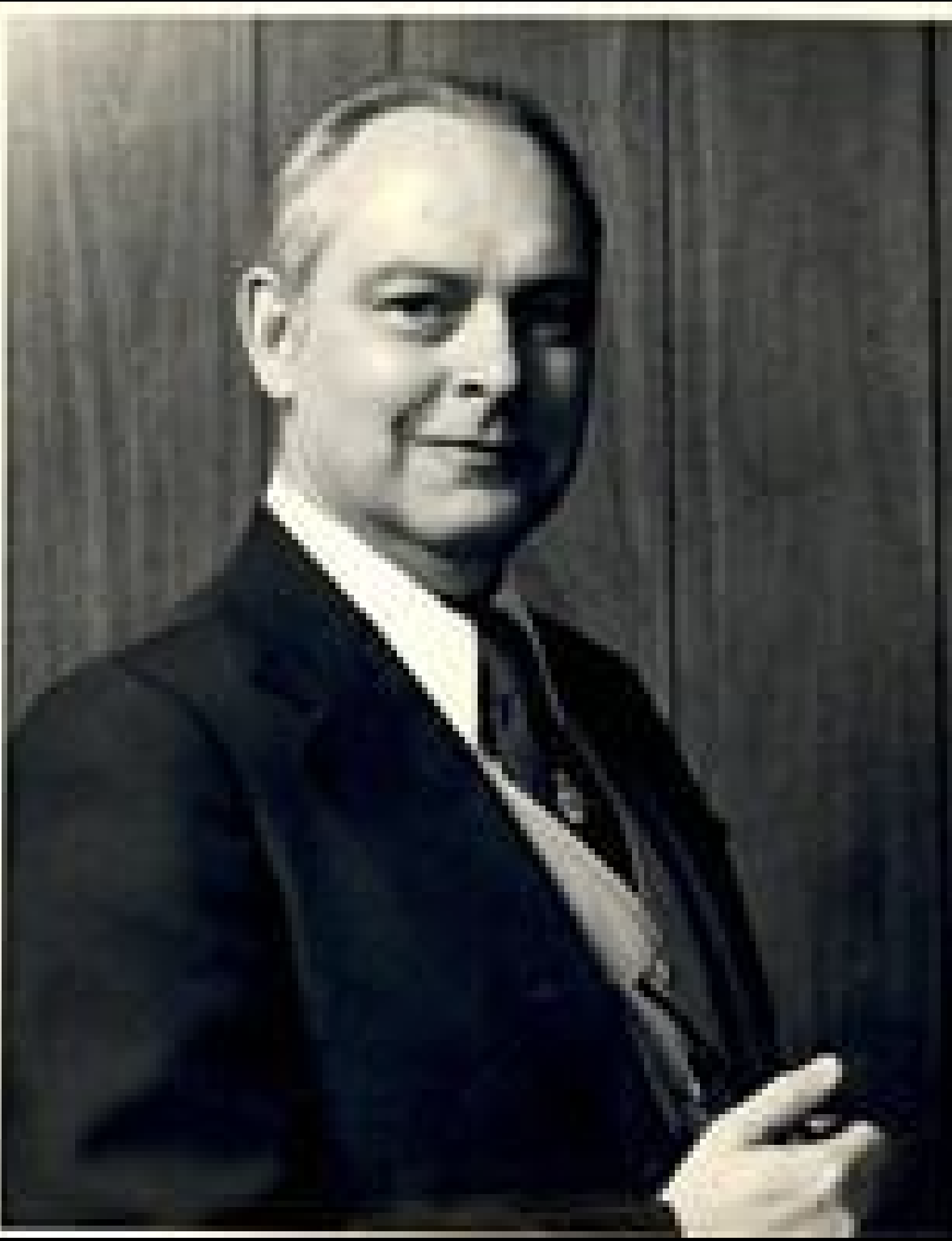
Raymond A. Whyte

Raymond A. Whyte (August 3, 1923 – April 9, 2003) was a surrealist artist known for trompe l’oeil, still life, fantasy paintings, and portraits with surreal elements. He was a popular artist of New York City financial executives and art collectors in the 1950s and 1960s, including B. Gerald Cantor, Malcolm Forbes and R. McLean Stewart. Five of Whyte's works were exhibited in the offices of Cantor-Fitzgerald and destroyed during the September 11 attacks on the World Trade Center.

== Early life and education ==
Whyte was born in Canmore, Alberta, Canada. He moved to New York City as a child and attended Dewitt Clinton High School in Lower Manhattan, along with B. Gerald Cantor, who would later become a friend and frequent patron of Whyte's artwork.

He began painting at two years old, and as a child would sit in The Metropolitan Museum of Art and attempt to copy the Rembrandts and Vermeers. As a teen, he was awarded a citywide scholarship to the Art Students League of New York, where he studied under Edwin Dickinson.

Whyte attended the University of Toronto, then served in the U.S. Army Signal Corps and later, the Royal Canadian Air Force as a navigator. While there, he also boxed as a light heavyweight for his pre-flight air crew.

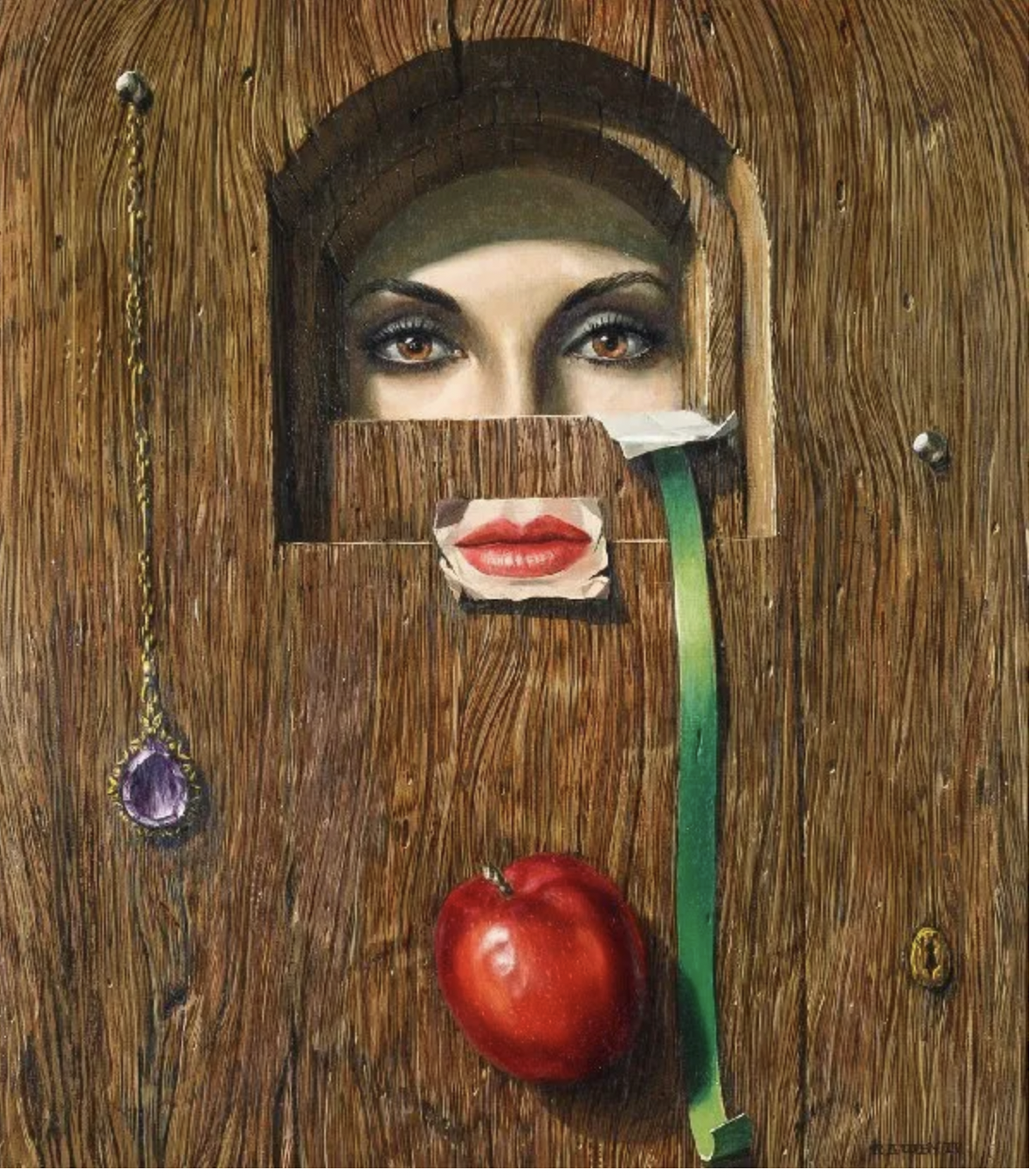
Eve (oil on canvas) by Raymond A. Whyte. The trompe l’oeil technique was often used by Whyte in depicting many different subjects.

He apprenticed under Yasuo Kuniyoshi, Louis Bouché, Robert Brackman, Frank Vincent DuMond, Vaclav Vytlacil and Will Barnet. Whyte studied in Venice, Paris, Madrid, Toronto and New York. He and his wife Erica were frequent travelers and he drew inspirations from his trips, including India, Japan and China.

== Career ==
Whyte started his career painting portraits in New York City, first inspired by the style of the Flemish masters Jan van Eyck and Rogier van der Weyden. At the height of his popularity in the mid-1960s, Whyte's commissions and portrait sittings were reported to cost US$10,000.

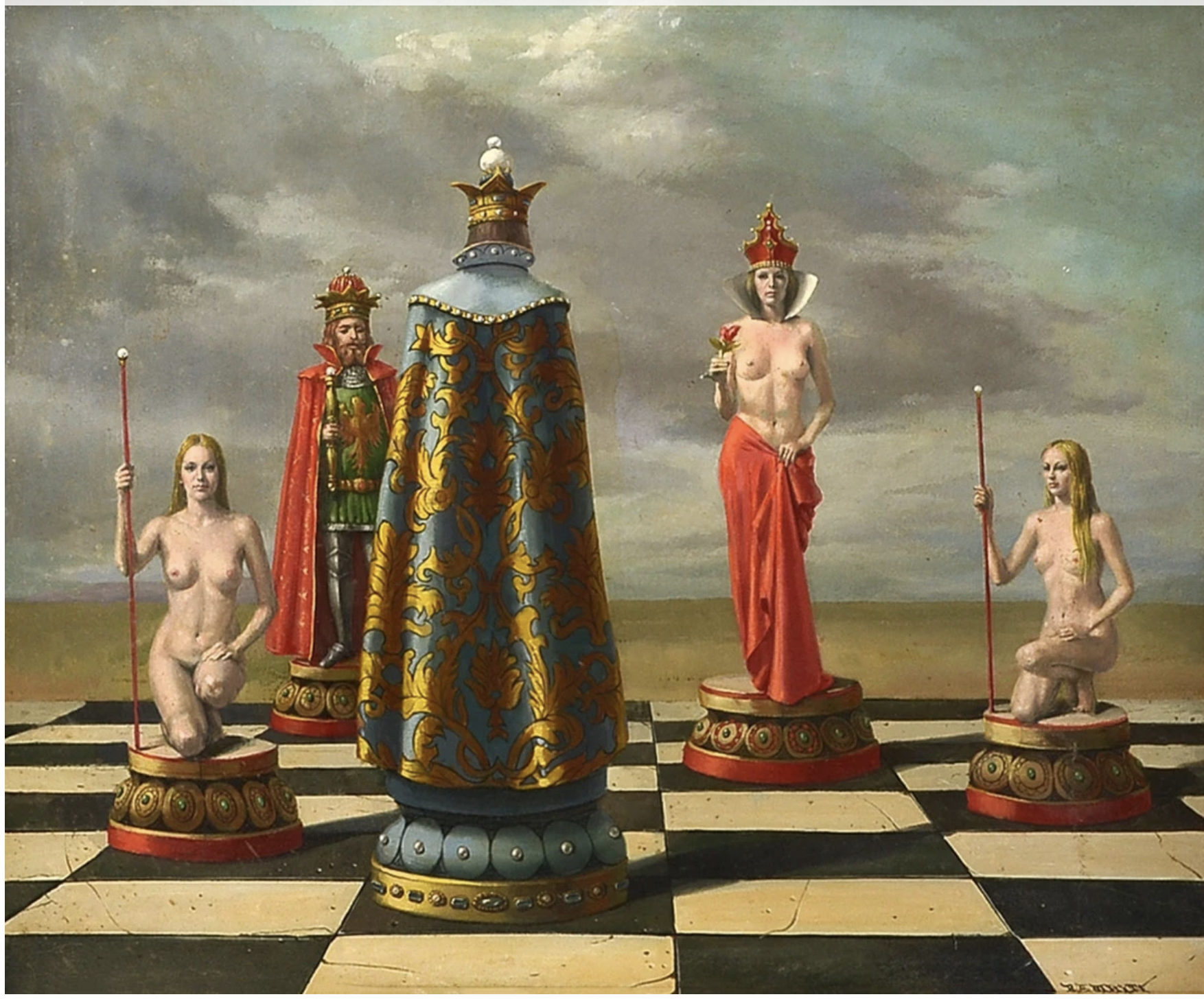
Check Mate (1980) Oil on Canvas

In 1953, Whyte lost the use of an eye, and had to retrain himself to paint. "With one eye, I had to work at dimension until I perfected it", he said. A few years later, he received a corneal transplant from a woman who was having an eye removed. She reportedly "seemed visibly brightened that it was going to an artist" and the two kept in touch regularly after that.

Whyte would soon add elements of his travels into his still life and portrait work. His work evolved to what would later be described as "Hieronymus Bosch at a Puritan picnic”. One critic referred to him as "the reigning influence in contemporary surrealism". His subjects included nudes, exotic items, surreal landscapes, and sometimes mythical creatures and battle scenes. His wife Erica was often a model for his figure paintings and nudes.

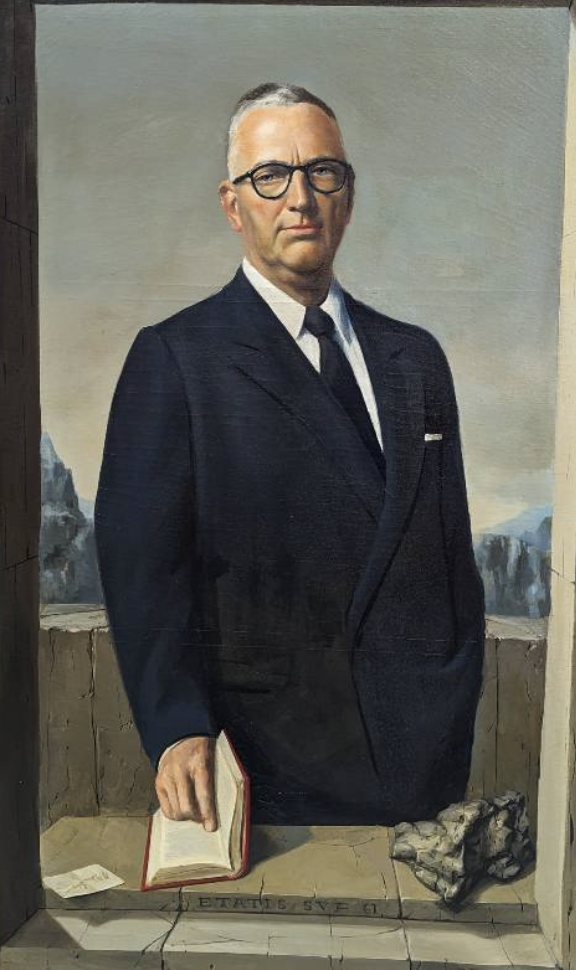
Portrait of Robert McLean Stewart (1961) Whyte was commissioned for Portraits earlier in his career, and was known for later adding surreal and trompe l’oeil elements.

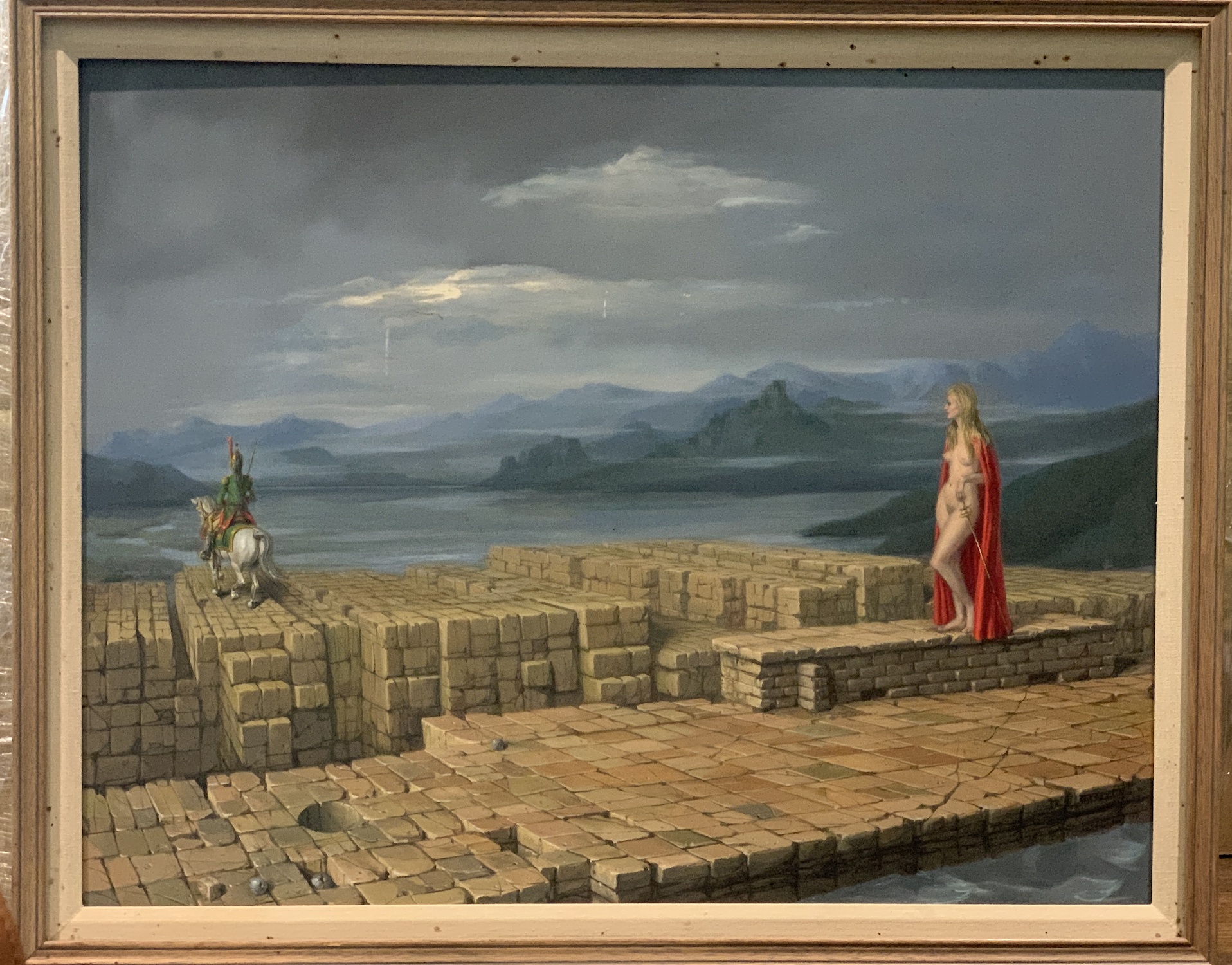
Untitled, Surrealist Landscape, oil on canvas, circa 1963. Whyte's depictions of medieval knights, women and animals were recurring motifs of his work.

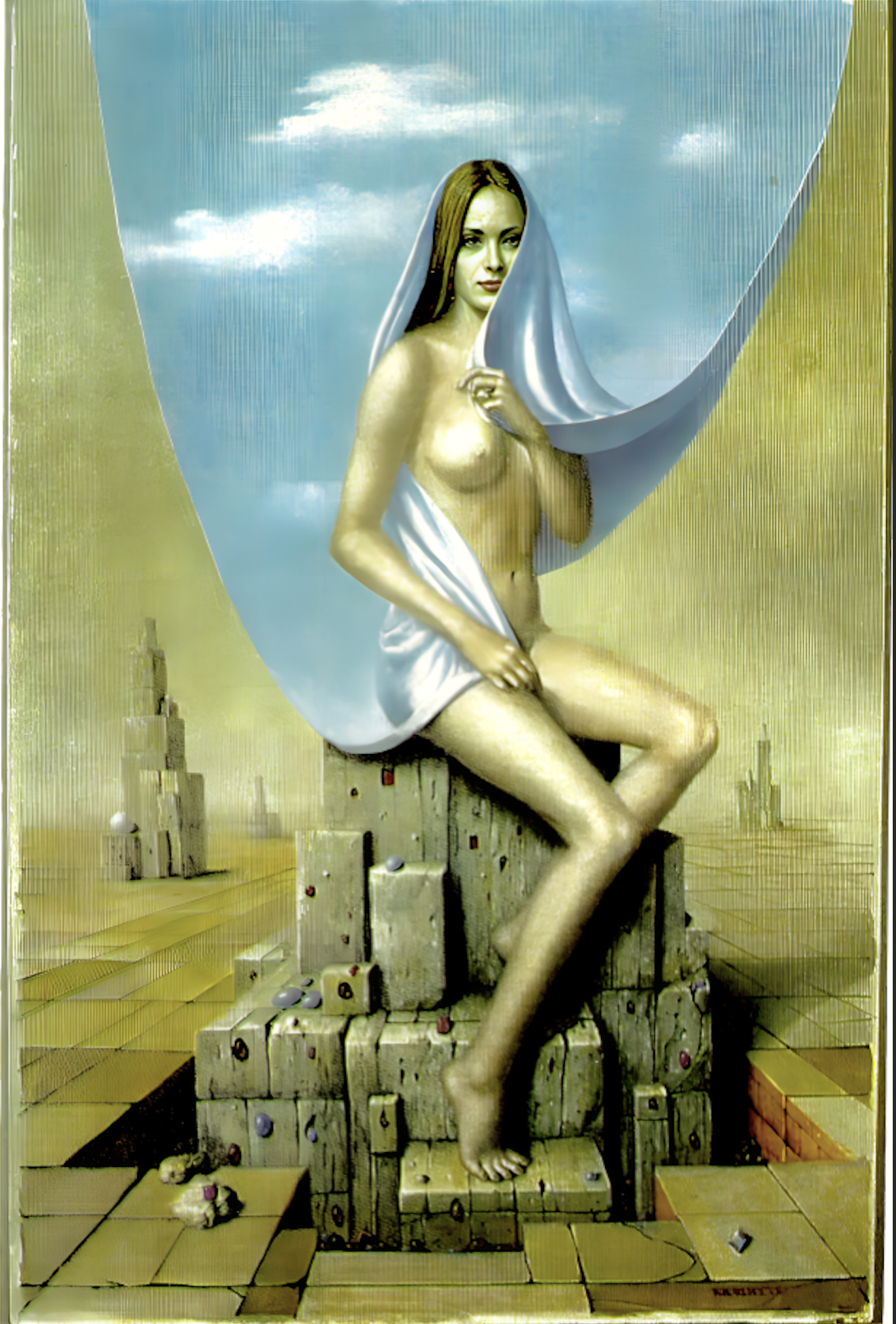
Wrapped in Clouds (1977) Whyte later experimented with tromp l'oeil techniques that incorporated the sky and other backgrounds to interact with the subject.

In 1967, Whyte's painting The Golden Elephant was loaned, along with several Rodin sculptures, to the Crocker Museum in Sacramento by B. Gerald Cantor. After its exhibition, Cantor later donated the painting to Crocker's permanent collection.

In 1975, two of Whyte's paintings, The Girl In the Yellow Shirt and The Violin, were shown at the opening of the Benedict Art Gallery in Madison, New Jersey.

Whyte held over 30 solo exhibitions in New York City, San Francisco, Houston, Naples, London and Paris, including the de Saisset Museum of Art and the Crocker Art Museum. His work was included in shows at Museum of Fine Arts, Houston; The Columbia Museum of Art; the Butler Institute of American Art; the Malcom Forbes Exhibitions; Allied Artists; Audubon Artist and The De Beers Museum in South Africa.

His works were in the collections of Malcolm Forbes, Orson Bean, B. Gerald Cantor, Vivian Vance, Gerald B. Kara and J. Paul Getty.

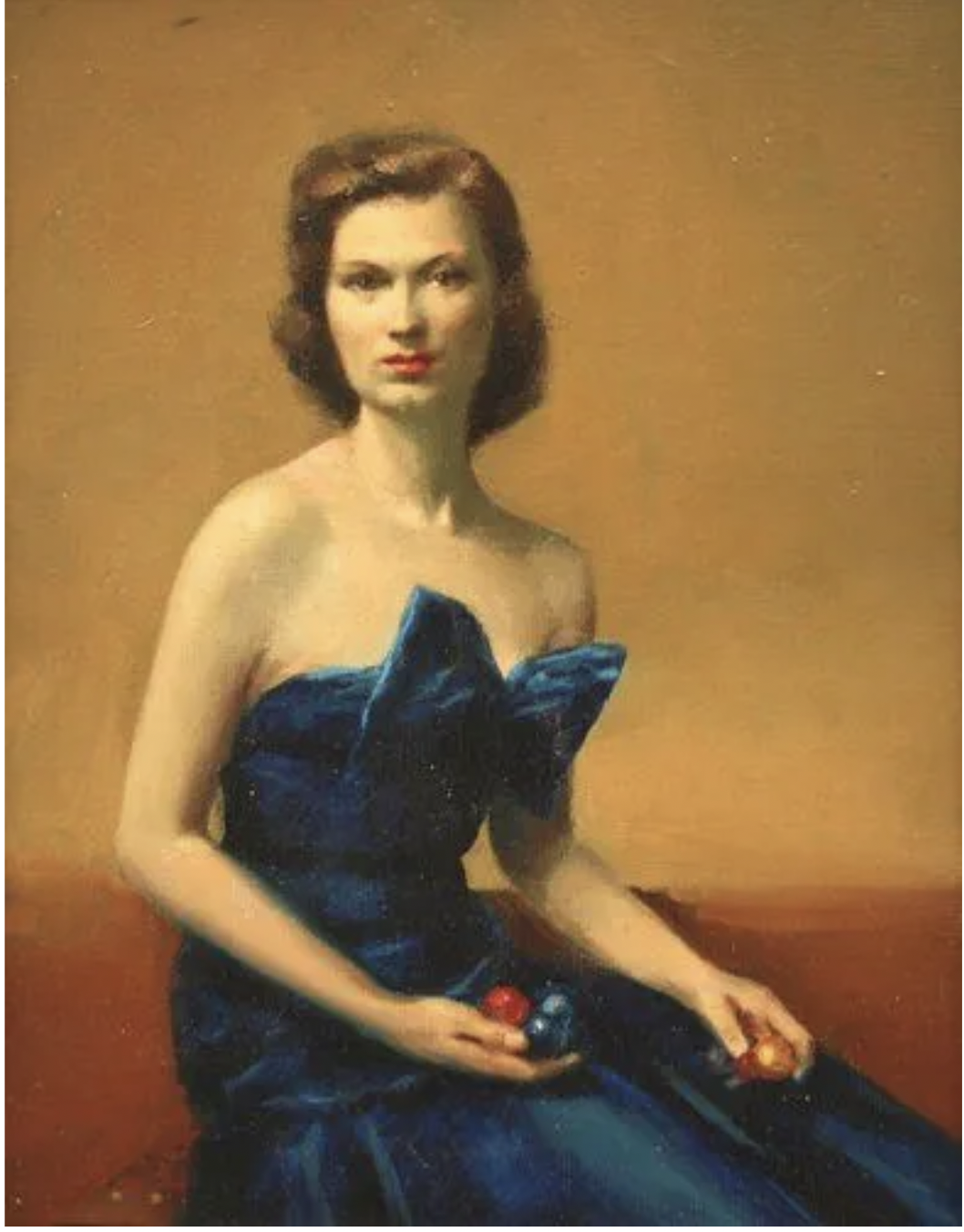
Portrait of Erica (oil on board) Whyte's wife Erica was often employed as a subject for portrait ideas and figure drawing.

== Cantor-Fitzgerald paintings ==
On September 11, 2001, five of Whyte's artworks, including a large triptych depicting B. Gerald Cantor and wife Iris and another that told the history of Cantor-Fitzgerald, were destroyed in the terrorist attacks.

== Personal life ==
In the late 1990s Whyte suffered a stroke that rendered him unable to speak, and took away the use of his right hand, making him only able to paint a few seascapes. After undergoing extensive therapy he was able to say a few words ("Yes" and "Damn"), and later could sing "Happy Birthday".

== Death ==
Whyte died in Spring Hill, Florida on April 9, 2003.
