= Iris Cantor =

American philanthropist (1931–2026)

- Born: Iris Bazel; February 14, 1931; New York City, U.S.
- Died: February 22, 2026 (aged 95); Palm Beach, Florida, U.S.
- Occupations: Fashion model, stockbroker, executive secretary
- Spouse: Bernard Gerald Cantor (m. 1977; died 1996)
- Awards: Legion of Honour – Officer (2017)

Iris Cantor (née Bazel, February 14, 1931 – February 22, 2026) was an American philanthropist based in New York City and Los Angeles, with a primary interest in medicine and the arts. Cited among the 50 top contributors in the United States, as head of the Iris and B. Gerald Cantor Foundation, her foundation has donated several hundred million dollars to museums, universities, and hospitals from 1978 on.

== Early life ==
Born Iris Bazel on February 14, 1931, as the eldest daughter of Fay and Al Bazel, she grew up in Crown Heights, Brooklyn, New York City. Her mother was born in Pennsylvania and her father was a Jewish Russian immigrant. Her two younger sisters, Enid and Binnie, were born 3 and 10 years later.

== Bernie Cantor ==
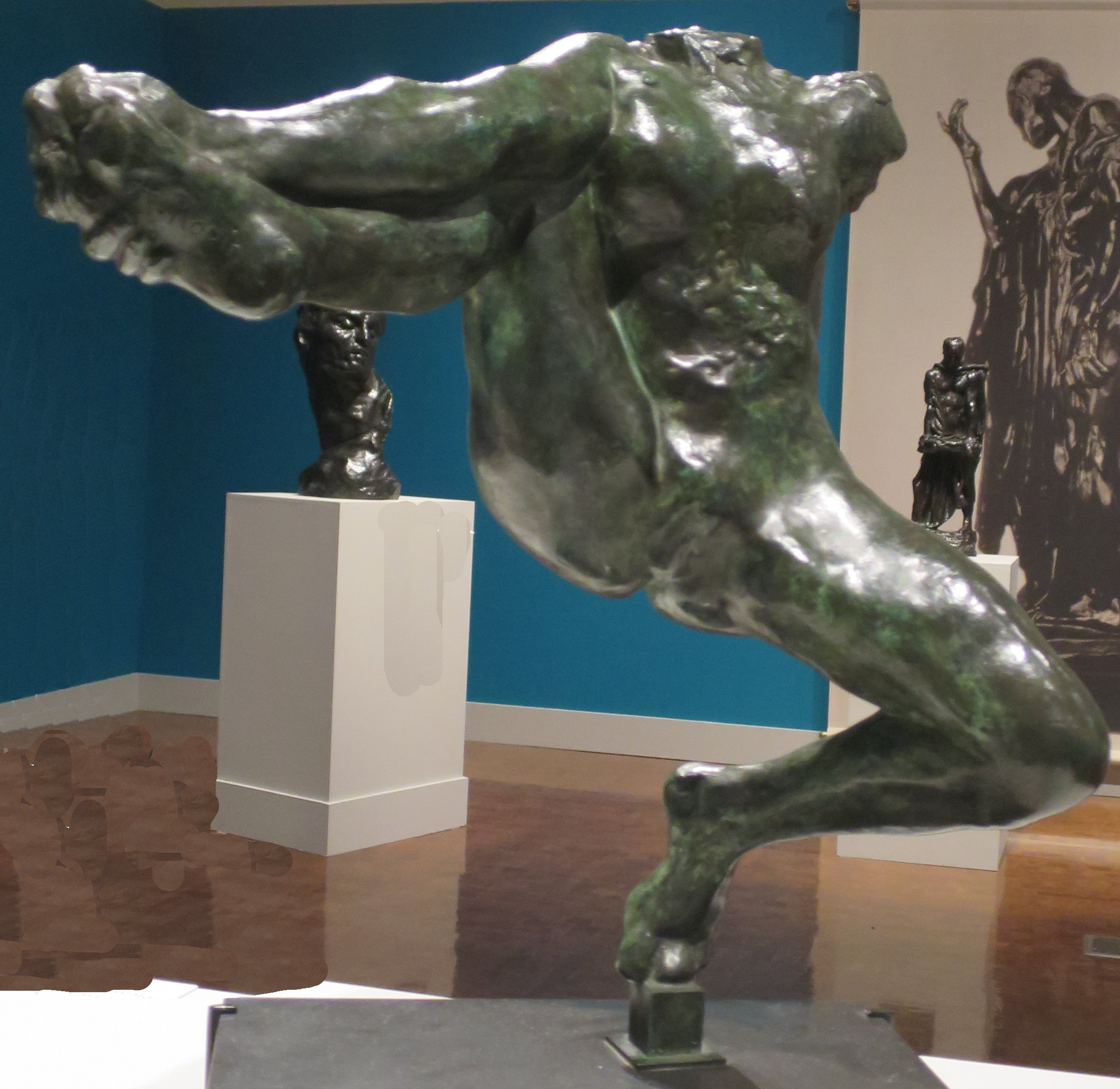
Iris, Messenger of the Gods by Auguste Rodin, bronze, modeled 1891, property of Iris Cantor

Drawn to Manhattan, she worked as a fashion model and stockbroker before eventually being hired by bond brokerage Cantor Fitzgerald around 1967, as an executive secretary. In 1977, she married the firm's founder and majority owner, Bernard Gerald Cantor. It was her third marriage, and lasted nearly 20 years until his death in 1996. By this time, "Bernie" Cantor had amassed a fortune said to have exceeded $500 million, receiving $50 million in annual dividends as of 1995.

Subsequent to his business success, Bernie Cantor became a well-regarded art collector, and most notably had acquired over 750 sculptures and drawings by Auguste Rodin, and many American and European masters' paintings.

== Iris and B. Gerald Cantor Foundation ==
In 1978, the year after their union, the Cantors founded the Iris and B. Gerald Cantor Foundation as a vehicle for their philanthropy. In 1996, after acrimonious litigation with her husband's successor, Mrs. Cantor sold her inherited 55% stake to the 170 limited partners of Cantor Fitzgerald, and the company agreed to additionally fund the foundation. In 2024, the 501(c)(3) Private Operating Foundation claimed total revenue of $1,503,805 and total assets of $49,052,106.

Over the years, the foundation has donated approximately 450 Rodin pieces to museums around the world, with many going to New York's Metropolitan Museum and Brooklyn Museum, Stanford University, and the Los Angeles County Museum of Art.

In addition to the artworks, the foundation has financed numerous museum and university expansions:

- Metropolitan Museum of Art: the Iris and B. Gerald Cantor Exhibition Hall, the B. Gerald Cantor Sculpture Galleries, and the Iris and B. Gerald Cantor Roof Garden, with gifts of $11.5 million (as of 1994).
- Brooklyn Museum of Art: the Iris and B. Gerald Cantor Gallery and the Iris and B. Gerald Cantor Auditorium.
- Stanford University: 268 Rodin pieces formed the Iris and B. Gerald Cantor Center for Visual Arts, with a $10 million donation in 1994.
- Los Angeles County Museum of Art, 114 pieces plus the B. Gerald Cantor Sculpture Garden
- New York University's Tisch School of the Arts: Iris and B. Gerald Cantor Film Center, plus permanent scholarship fund, and Faye's Cafe, named in honor of her mother.
- College of the Holy Cross – The Iris and B. Gerald Cantor Art Gallery

From 1995, she was a trustee of the Metropolitan Museum and the Brooklyn Museum, as well as the Los Angeles County Museum of Art, and North Carolina Museum of Art among others.

She made additional donations to medical facilities and foundations:

- UCLA Health System – Cantor established the Iris-Cantor – UCLA Women's Health Center in 1995. She was involved with the UCLA Foundation since 1989, and served as a Foundation Governor from 2005.
- NewYork-Presbyterian/Weill Cornell – Cantor donated the funds for eleven birthing rooms, two operating rooms, and waiting rooms in 1996. She donated $5 million in 2002 to form the Iris Cantor Women's Health Center, and $20 million in 2010, to launch the Iris Cantor Men's Health Center, the Iris and B. Gerald Cantor Ambulatory Surgery Center, and the Iris and B. Gerald Cantor Laboratory for Immunological Research in Diabetes.
- Memorial Sloan-Kettering Cancer Center – Cantor funded a Senior Chair in 2007.
- David Geffen School of Medicine – in 2018, Cantor donated $10 million to improve the school's women's health curriculum and fund a chair position.

Cantor sat on the board of trustees of New York-Presbyterian Hospital from 1989. Iris Cantor's other board memberships included Exploring the Arts and the dean's committee of the Tisch School of the Arts at New York University.

== Personal life and death ==
In 2011, Cantor sold the 34,000 square foot Bel-Air, California mansion that Bernie built for her, for a reported $40 million.

Cantor died on February 22, 2026, at the age of 95.

== Awards ==
Cantor received awards and honorary degrees, including a National Medal of Arts awarded by President Bill Clinton in 1995. For her work promoting appreciation for the French sculptor Auguste Rodin, she was made a Knight in France's Legion of Honour in 2000; upgraded to an Officer on 20 March 2017.
