= Robert Philipp =

American painter

- Born: Moses Solomon Philipp; February 2, 1895; New York City, US
- Died: November 22, 1981 (aged 86); New York City, US
- Known for: Painting

Robert Philipp (February 2, 1895 – November 22, 1981) was an American painter influenced by Impressionism and Post-Impressionism, and known for his nudes, still lifes, and portraits of attractive women and Hollywood stars. Noted art critic Henry McBride called Philipp one of America's top six painters of his generation. He was an instructor of painting at the Art Students League of New York for 33 years, the American artist Itshak Holtz was a student of Philipp. Philipp was Secretary of the National Academy of Design, and National Academician, Benjamin Franklin Fellow, Royal Society of Arts in London. He was married to model and fellow artist Rochelle ("Shelly") Post, who frequently posed for him until her death in 1971. His compositions and painting style have been compared to the art of Edgar Degas and Pierre-Auguste Renoir. Philipp won prizes in most of the important exhibitions of his time, and his paintings are in numerous museums and important private collections.

== Hollywood commissions ==
In 1940, Philipp was invited to Los Angeles by Hollywood mogul Louis B. Mayer to paint portraits of Metro-Goldwyn-Mayer movie stars. The same year, Walter Wanger, producer of The Long Voyage Home, directed by John Ford and based on plays by Eugene O'Neill, contracted with Reeves Lewenthal, head of the Associated American Artists gallery in Manhattan, to bring nine well-known artists to the set and paint scenes from the movie and portraits of the actors in character. The artists included Robert Philipp, Thomas Hart Benton, Grant Wood, Ernest Fiene, George Schreiber, Luis Quintanilla, George Biddle, Raphael Soyer, and James Chapin. Life magazine featured the 12 canvases produced, which were exhibited in New York and in 23 museums around the country. While on the West Coast, Philipp painted portraits of celebrities associated with the Golden Age of Hollywood, including Clark Gable, Shirley Temple, Margaret Sullavan, Ian Hunter, Thomas Mitchell, and Mayer's daughter, Edith Mayer Goetz, wife of William Goetz, who was a co-owner of 20th Century Fox.

== Awards and distinctions ==
Robert Philipp won prizes in most of the important exhibitions of his time including the National Academy of Design, New York, Second Hallgarten Prize (1922); the Chicago Art Institute, First Prize and Logan Gold Medal (1936); Carnegie International, First Honorable Mention (1937); the Corcoran Gallery, Washington, D.C., Corcoran Silver Medal and Clarke Prize (1939); International Business Machine Corporation, Honorary Award and Medal for Distinction and Contribution to American Art (1939); Academician, National Academy of Design (1945); the National Academy of Design, Thomas B. Clark Prize (1947); the National Academy of Design, Ranger Food Purchase Award (1950); the National Academy of Design, First Altman Prize (1951); Laguna Beach Art Association Festival, First Prize (1951); the Art Directors ClubMedal of Merit (1954); the National Arts Club, New York, Gold Medal (1955); Allied Artists of America, Bronze Medal (1958); Audubon Artists, Emily Lowe Award (1959); Allied Artists of America Prize (1960); the National Academy of Design, Henry Ward Ranger Purchase Award, Benjamin Altman Prize (1962); the Salmagundi Club, New York, Prize (1960); the National Academy of Design, Benjamin Altman Prize, Gloria Layton Memorial Prize (1966); and the American Watercolor Society, William Church Osborne Award (1967).

== Public collections ==
Paintings by Robert Philipp can be found in numerous public collections around the United States including those of the Akron Art Institute, Ohio; University of Arizona, Tucson; Brooklyn Museum, New York; Columbus Museum of Art, Georgia; Corcoran Gallery, Washington, D.C.; Dallas Museum of Fine Arts, Texas; Davenport Municipal Art Gallery, Iowa; Dayton Art Institute, Ohio; Encyclopædia Britannica, Chicago; IBM Corporation; Los Angeles County Museum of Art, Los Angeles; University of Illinois, Urbana; Telfair Museum of Art, Savannah, Georgia; Seton Hall University, the Walsh Gallery and The High Museum of Art, Atlanta, Georgia.
