= Itshak Holtz =

Polish-Israeli-American painter

Itshak Holtz יצחק הולץ
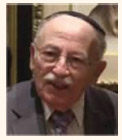
- Born: Itshak Jack Holtz; December 13, 1925; Skierniewice, Poland
- Died: December 21, 2018 (aged 93); Jerusalem, Israel
- Education: Bezalel Academy of Art and Design; Art Students League of New York; National Academy of Design
- Known for: Painting
- Movement: Genre art, Impressionism, Expressionism, Realism
- Spouse: Gertrude Ruth Holtz (Beck)
- Children: Arie and Aliza
- Website: itshakholtz.net

Itshak Jack Holtz (Hebrew: יצחק הולץ; also known as Itzhak Holtz and Issac Holtz; 1925–2018) was a Polish-born and an Israeli and American Orthodox Jewish painter, who is best known for his paintings and drawings that depict traditional scenes of Jewish life.

== Early life and education ==
The youngest of four children, Holtz was born and spent his early childhood in Skierniewice, Poland, a small town near Warsaw. His father was a hat maker and a furrier. In 1935, prior to World War II, when Holtz was ten years old, his family moved to Jerusalem, Israel, where they settled in the Geula neighborhood near Meah Shearim.

Itzhak Holtz's passion for art began early. When he was five years old, in Poland, his father first drew a picture of a horse and sled in the snow for him. The young Holtz looked at the drawing and studied it in wonderment. From that moment on, Holtz remembers, he constantly begged his father to draw for him. His enthusiasm for art grew and Holtz longed to study art. In 1945, he enrolled at the Bezalel Academy of Art and Design in Jerusalem, where he primarily studied lettering and poster work in a program geared toward commercial art. Holtz became interested in painting, prompting him to move to New York City in 1950 to study at the Art Students League of New York under Robert Brackman and Harry Sternberg, and then at the National Academy of Design under Robert Philipp.

== Art career and work ==
Holtz stated that his artwork, which primarily but not exclusively depicts scenes of Jewish spirituality and tradition, was driven by his Orthodox Jewish beliefs. He said, "You have to live that religious life to fully capture it on canvas." He has been classified in the school of genre painting, often depicting street scenes of ordinary people in everyday Jewish life in the back alleys and markets of Jerusalem neighborhoods such as Me'ah Shearim and Geula; and in New York neighborhoods and hamlets such as Monsey, Boro Park and Williamsburg. Along with street scenes, his work included portraits of scribes, tailors, cobblers and fishmongers, and images such as shtetls, lighthouses, and wedding scenes. He started out painting mostly portraits in order to support his family, before expanding to include street scenes. His beloved subject matter was painting scenes of Jewish life, his childhood memories when his mother took him shopping for the Sabbath to the markets of Meah Shearim, left a deep impression on him and influenced many of his works. Holtz experimented in the abstract, but then reverted to representational and figurative art to which he devoted himself exclusively. His Israeli street scenes are said to combine "an affectionate recollection of the past with the brilliance of the color of modern Israel."

Holtz stated that he struggled at first when he arrived to the United States because of financial reasons and because he only knew Polish, Yiddish and Hebrew, but then made good ties with his instructor who greatly influenced him Robert Philipp who helped him make friends and referred him to paint portraits.

Examples of Holtz's work throughout the years include: Yerusalem Wedding (2010), depicting a Chuppa in Jerusalem on early evening, oil on canvas; The Funeral(1966), depicting five stoic Hasidim carrying a body on a bier over to a gravesite, with the people behind them crying, in charcoal on paper and oil on canvas; Rejoicing (1974), an image of religious men dancing, in felt pen and marker on paper; and the oil painting Shamash Learning in Shul (2003), a portrait of a pious Jew studying the Talmud inside a claustrophobic synagogue scene.

Throughout the years Holtz created hundreds of works in many art mediums, including genre scenes, portraits, still lifes and landscape scenery. His works are sought after by art collectors worldwide, and he was called the greatest living Jewish artist. It is said that no artist ever explored the Jewish subject like Holtz. Today some of his oil paintings have been commanding over $100,000.

== Style and technique ==
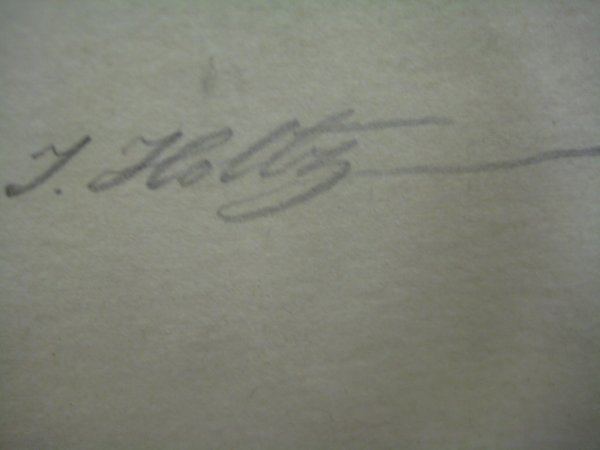
Itshak Holtz Signature

Holtz created his scenes after researching locations, and often used locals as models. He painted slowly and with great care, but with a swift Impressionistic style. The people in his portraits and scenes are generally more cheerful and optimistic than standard portraits of Hassidic individuals. He painted oils and watercolors, and also did felt pen, pastel, marker, ink and charcoal drawings, as well as woodcuts. His oil paintings typically have a brown hue, while his work with felt pen is often in sepia tones, and on some of his works he used very bright colors, with a strong emphasis on the interplay of light and shadow. He was heavily influenced by the ancient staircases and alleyways of Jerusalem, with its modest religious population, which made a strong impression on him in his youth, the streets of Tzfat, and the works of Rembrandt, Johannes Vermeer and Peter Bruegel, as well as Jewish artists Moritz Daniel Oppenheim, Leonid Pasternak and Isidor Kaufmann had a strong influence on him. He said that realism is the best way he can express himself.

== Exhibitions ==
Some of Holtz's past exhibitions include:

- A 1967 exhibit at the Theodor Herzl Institute in New York featured approximately 30 of his oil paintings.
- From October 1992 through July 1993, many of his Jewish genre paintings were exhibited at the Yeshiva University Museum in New York, in a show titled The World of Itshak Holtz.
- In 2012, the first exhibit at the Betzalel Gallery in Crown Heights, Brooklyn, was the month-long Itshak Holtz: A Personal Vision – Drawings and Watercolors, displaying his felt pen and marker drawings and watercolors from 1963 to 1999. His work had previously been displayed at the gallery's former Manhattan location in 1982.

== Awards and honors ==
- Academic of Italy with Gold Medal, 1981.
- Diploma of Merit, University delle Arti Terme, Italy, 1982.
- Gold Medal for Artistic Merit, International Parliament for Safety and Peace, 1985.
- Board of Directors' Award, Arts Interaction, New York, March 1989.
- Award, Arts Interaction, October 1989.
- Award, Arts Interaction, March 1990.
- Grumbacher Silver Medal and Certificate for Best in Show, Arts Interaction, April 1991.
- Judge, 13th Annual Autumn Show at Gallery 12, Arts Interaction, September 1991.

== Influence and legacy ==
Holtz was fascinated by the glamorous and the unglamorous, his genre art explored the strange beauty in simplicity and even in the deserted. He tended to reveal by his paintings things people don't appreciate in their everyday city lives. His nature landscapes and scenery were in an impressionistic style with an emphasis on light.

Holtz's Jewish art represents and reveals contemporary Jewish life with an important link to its past. For over half a century of painting the subject matter he cherished, he revealed in his Judaic art the modesty, spirit and simplicity of the religious life that so intrigued him on the Jerusalem streets since his childhood. He painted traditions, rituals, festivals, community and character. His art of Jewish subjects has influenced many younger Jewish artists like Eli Frucht from Brooklyn, and David Segal Lakewood New Jersey–based portrait painter, to follow and explore this Jewish genre.

== Personal life ==
Following his graduation from the Bezalel Academy of Art and Design, Holtz married Ruth Beck in 1951. They have two children, Arie and Aliza. For much of their time together, their primary residence was in Manhattan's Washington Heights neighborhood. Starting in the late 1960s, they maintained homes in both New York and Jerusalem.
