= Iris, Messenger of the Gods =

Sculpture by Auguste Rodin

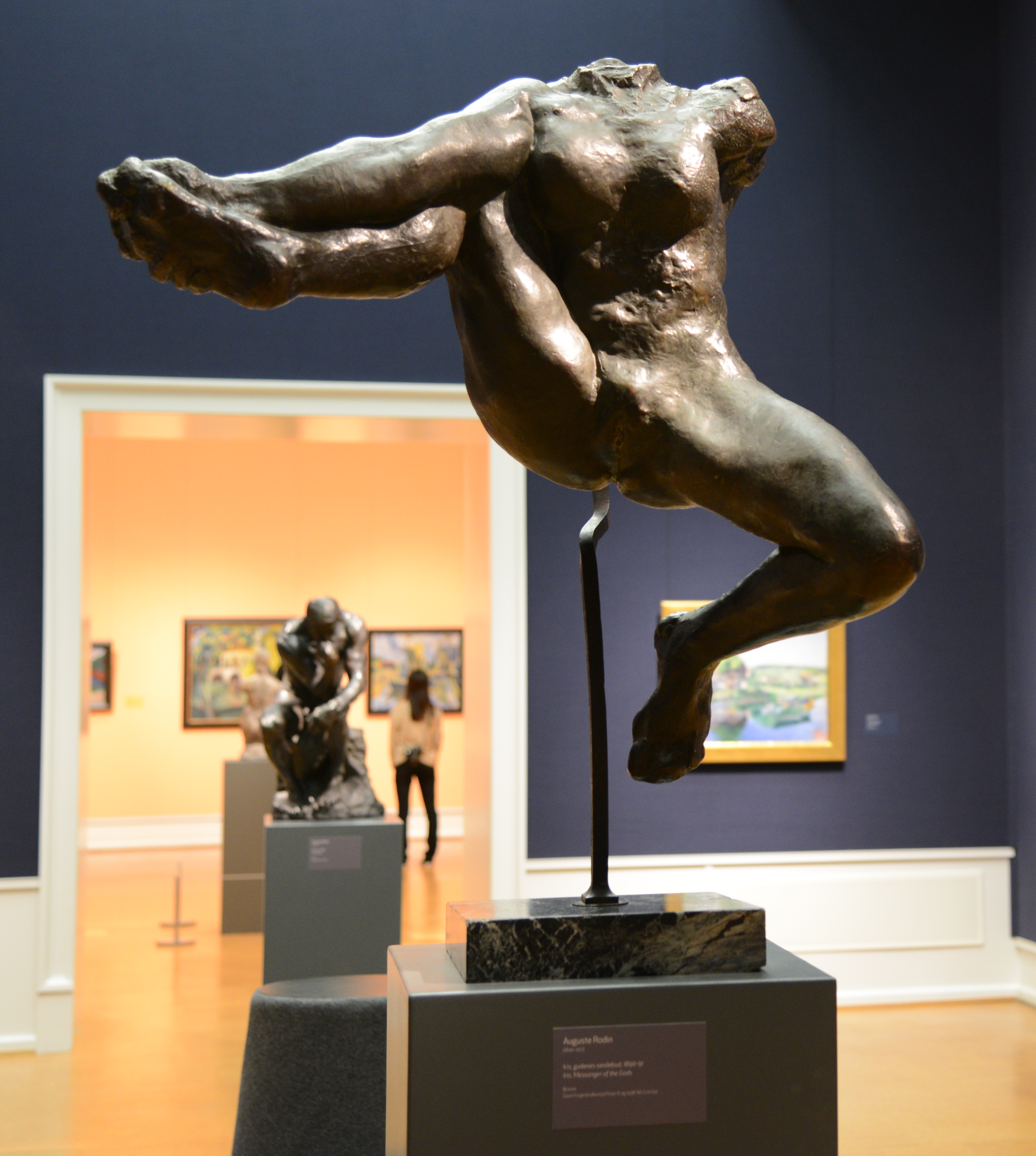
- The Museo Soumaya version
- Artist: Auguste Rodin
- Medium: Bronze
- Location: National Gallery of Norway, Oslo

Iris, Messenger of the Gods (French: "Iris, messagère des Dieux") (sometimes known as Flying Figure, or Eternal Tunnel) is a bronze sculpture by Auguste Rodin. A plaster model, created between 1891 and 1894, was cast in bronze by Fonderie Rudier at various times from about 1895. Iris is depicted with her right hand clasping her right foot and her naked body posed provocatively with her legs spread wide, displaying her genitalia.

== Background ==
The sculpture was conceived in 1891 as part of Rodin's second (and ultimately unrealised) proposal to create a monument to Victor Hugo for a site outside the Panthéon in Paris. Rodin received the commission in 1889, and he initially conceived a sculpture of Victor Hugo accompanied by three female figures representing Youth, Maturity and Old Age. Over time, the project evolved, and the parts of the figures became separate sculptures, including Meditation, Tragic Muse, and Iris. The figure that became Iris was intended to personify the "Spirit of the Nineteenth Century", or "Glory", hovering above the head of Hugo.

A simplified version of the Monument to Victor Hugo was later installed at the Palais Royale.

== Description ==
The original sculpture depicted the Greek goddess Iris as a woman, with sweeping wings, and legs spread wide. The pose recalls the uncompromising painting L'Origine du monde (1866) by Gustave Courbet (held in a private collection and still little known in 1890, but Rodin may have become acquainted with it through Edmond de Goncourt: Courbet's work gained wider exposure after being acquired by the Musée d'Orsay in 1981). It also evokes the athleticism of a gymnast or dancer stretching. The sculpture was probably from life, with the model lying on a bed or perhaps based on a can-can dancer. Indeed, it may be inspired by Rodin's clipping of the Chahut dancer "Grille d'Egout" from an 1891 issue of the Gil Blas magazine.

A small early study of Iris retains the head. The sculpture was altered in 1894, when it was enlarged by Rodin's assistant Henri Lebossé and reoriented vertically, with the left arm and head removed leaving a fragmentary torso similar to that of a damaged statue from Classical antiquity. It was catalogued as Study of a woman with legs apart in November 1894, and then cast in bronze at the Rudier Foundry. A full-size cast held by the Musée Rodin measures 82.7 cm × 69 cm × 63 cm (32.6 in × 27.2 in × 24.8 in).

A cast was exhibited at the Sixth Munich Secession exhibition in 1898, and then, under the title Another Voice, at Rodin's retrospective in a temporary pavilion at the Place de l'Alma during the Exposition Universelle in 1900. The work was initially very controversial due to its unabashed eroticism, so it was retained in Rodin's studio. A cast owned by Edward Perry Warren was donated to the Museum of Fine Arts, Boston, in 1908, but the museum felt unable to exhibit the "unshowable" work, and sold it in 1953. (Warren collected other controversial artworks: he also owned the Warren Cup, and his donation of a stone version of Rodin's The Kiss to the local council in Lewes was returned as being unsuitable for public display.) The Victoria and Albert Museum accepted the artist's donation of an early cast in 1914, cataloguing it as "Crouching Woman". Today, the official copies of the sculpture are kept in museums of Oslo, Zurich, Paris, Washington, Basel, New York, Los Angeles and Adelaide.

Iris has been described by the art historian Jane Mayo Roos as "open[ing] her thighs in a pose of candid, aggressive sexuality". The critic Arthur Symons wrote that "All the force of the muscle palpitates in this strenuous flesh, the whole splendour of her sex, unveiled, palpitates in the air, the messenger of the gods, bringing some divine message, pauses in flight, an embodied inspiration". The sculpture has also drawn feminist criticism given Iris' sexually objectifying pose. In particular, the title of the pose suggests that the figure's sexual organ is her means of verbal communication. By removing them and repositioning the legs into their current confrontational pose, Rodin erases any sense of individualism in favor of anonymous carnality.

== Versions ==
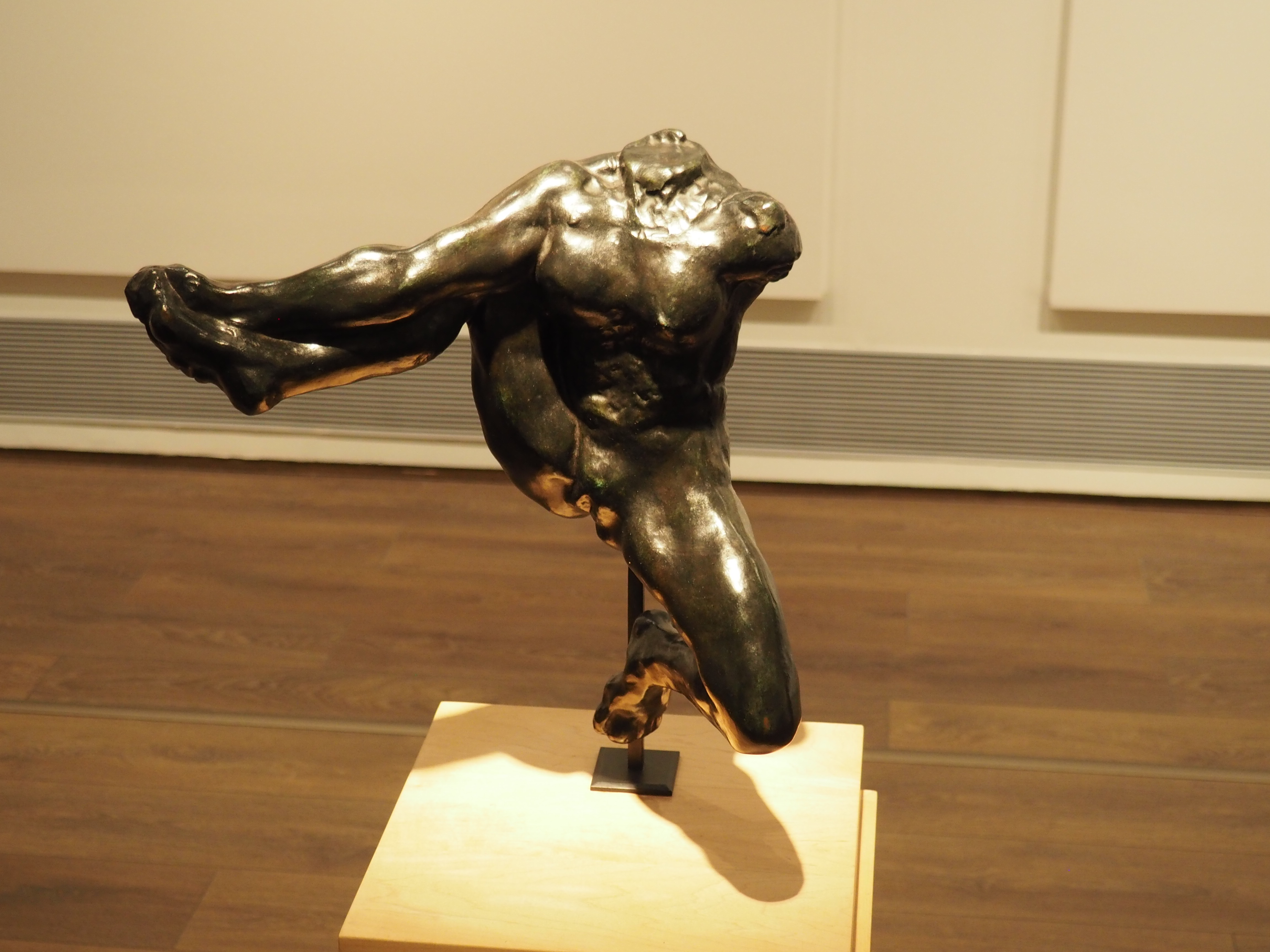
Auguste Rodin, Iris, Messenger of the Gods, Israel Museum, Jerusalem

Examples of the sculpture exists in a number of smaller casts.

A 82.9 cm (32.6 in) high version, cast by Rudier in 1902-5, one of just seven known castings made during Rodin's lifetime, was sold for £11.57m at Sotheby's in 2016. It was sold from the collection of Sylvester Stallone, who had nicknamed it the "flying beaver". Stallone had acquired it at auction in 2007 for £4.6m, then a record for Rodin. Lucian Freud also owned a copy for many years, which he placed at the end of his bed, making it the first thing he saw in the morning.

Ten smaller 41 cm (16 in) high bronze casts were made by the Rudier Foundry for the Musée Rodin between 1945 and 1965. One was sold at Christie's in 2007 for US$880,000, and another at Bonham's in 2014 for US$509,000. A 95.5 cm (37.6 in) high version, cast in 1963, was sold for US$2.89m at Sotheby's in 2016.

A 17.8 cm (7.0 in) version is held by the Museum of Modern Art in New York, and the Metropolitan Museum of Art has a 44.5 cm (17.5 in) version, cast in 1965.

The Musée Rodin had a series of 13 casts of a 53 cm (21 in) high version with the head intact and the stump of a left arm, known as Iris, Study with Head made by the Susse foundry between 1969 and 1972.

The work may have influenced Marcel Duchamp's explicit peephole installation Étant donnés. Some works of Francis Bacon show the influence of this sculpture, including his Lying Figure No. 1 (1959) and Reclining Woman (1961).

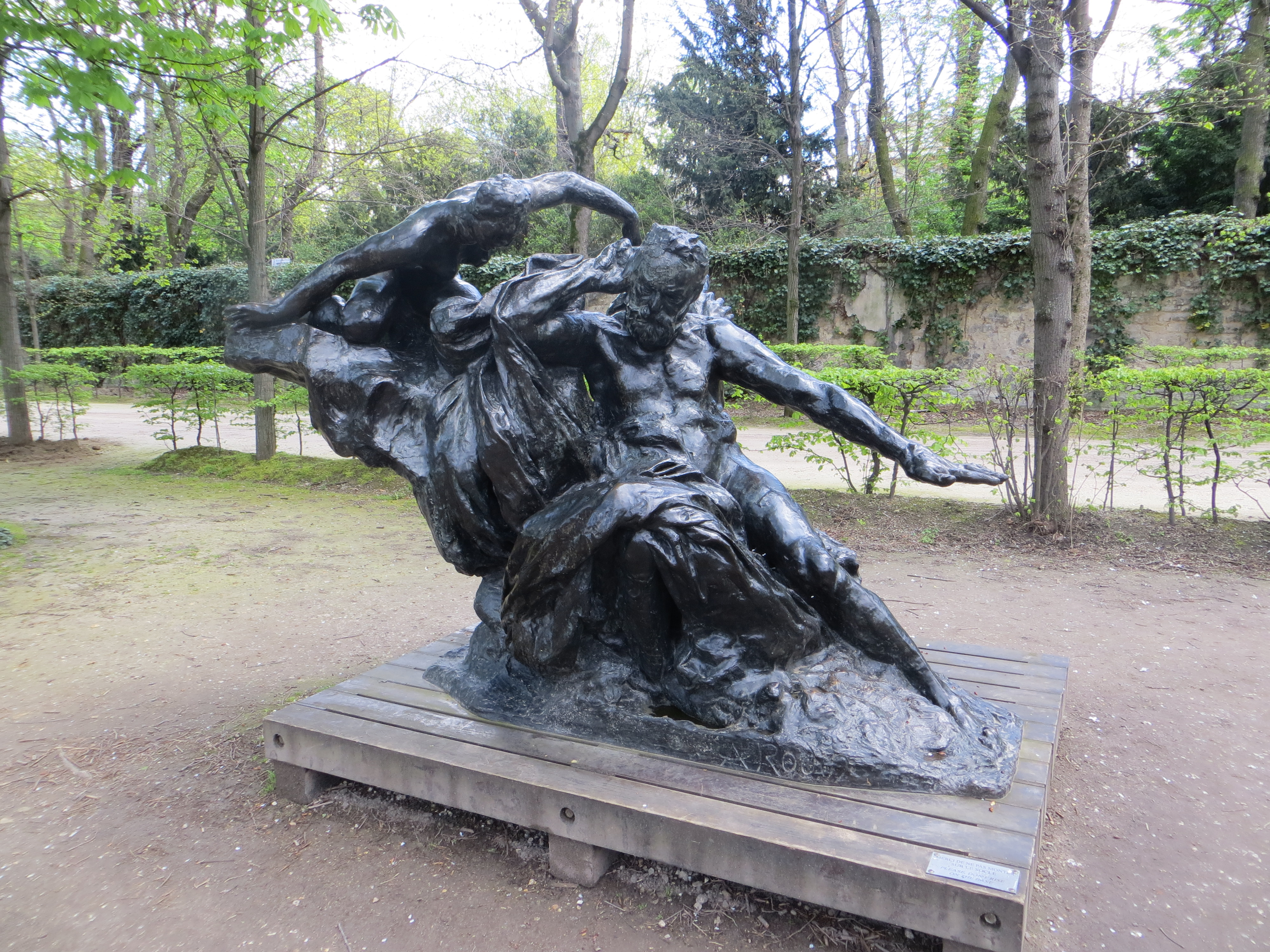
Rodin, Monument to Victor Hugo, at the Palais Royale, Paris, including Rodin's sculptures of Victor Hugo and his Tragic Muse

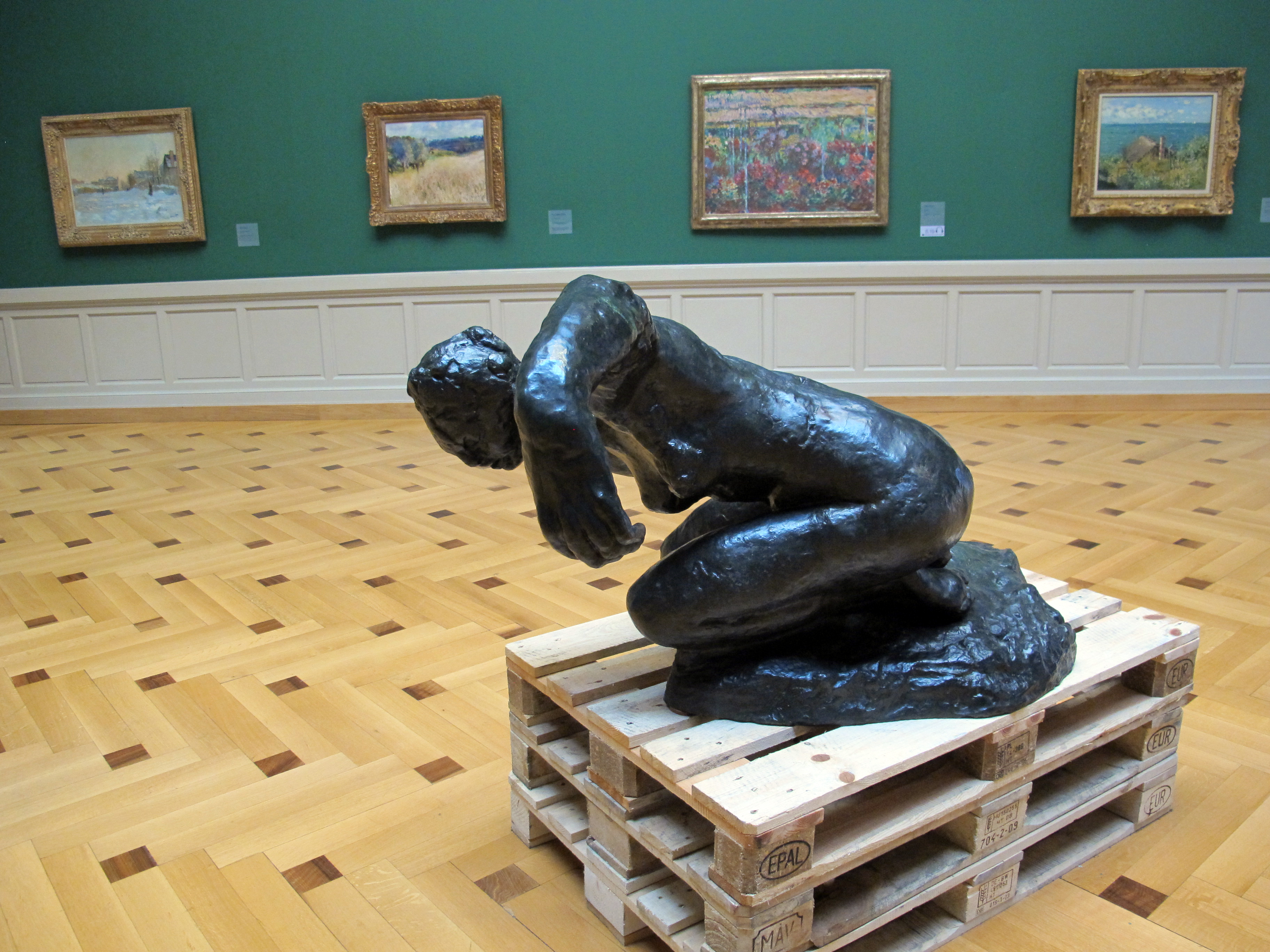
Rodin, Tragic Muse, Musée d'Art et d'Histoire, Geneva

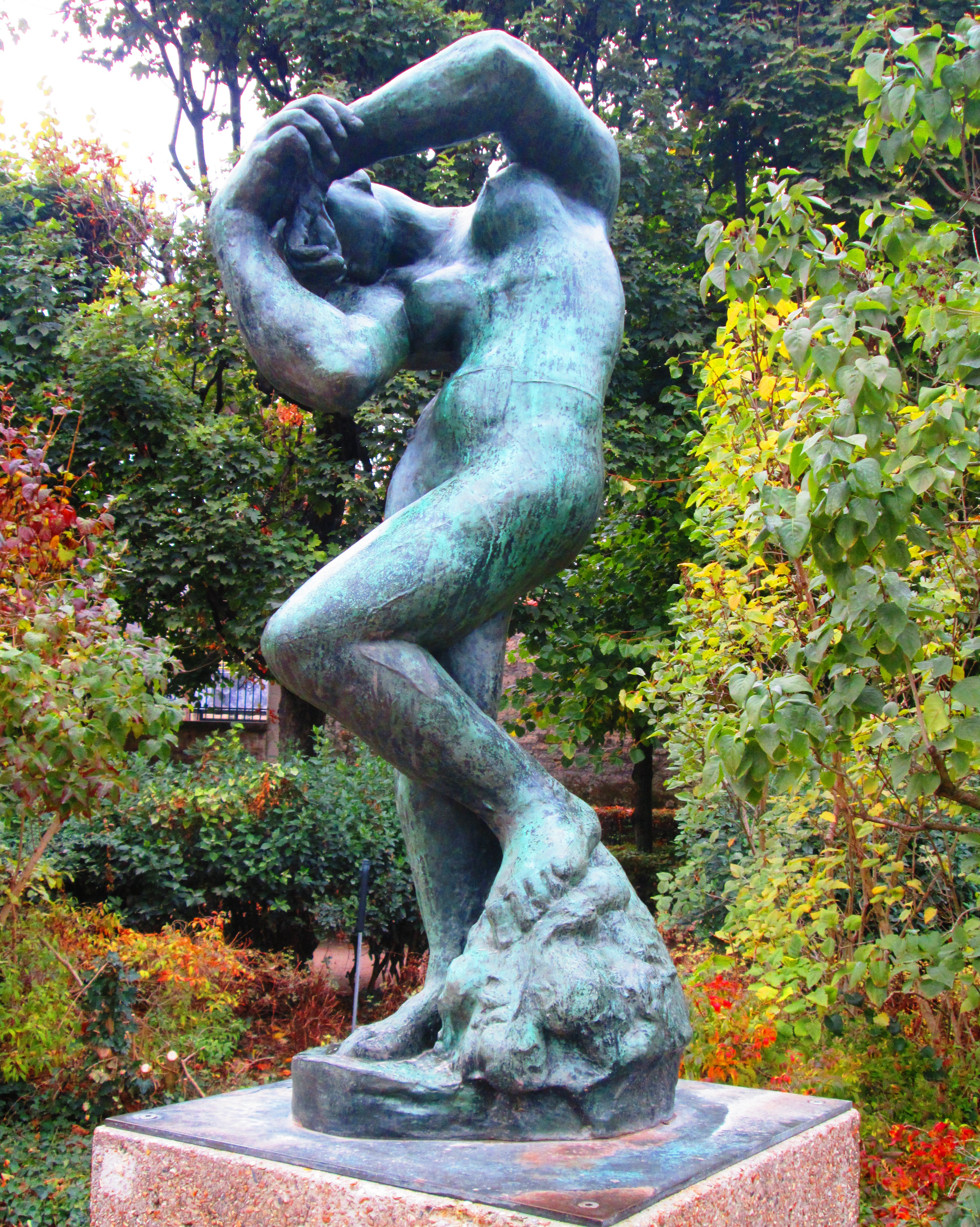
Rodin, Meditation, Musée Rodin, Paris

== See also ==
- List of sculptures by Auguste Rodin
