= Robert Brackman =

American painter

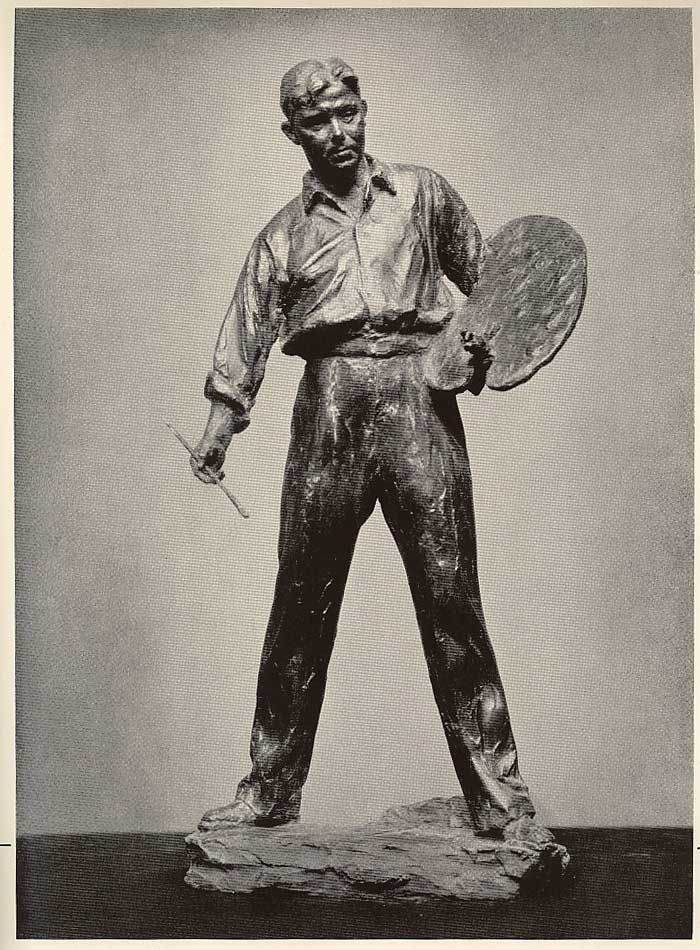
- Sculpture of Robert Brackman, published in the book Labor Sculpture by Max Kalish, Comet Press.
- Born: September 25, 1898; Odes'ka Oblast, Russian Empire
- Died: July 16, 1980; Noank, Connecticut, United States
- Education: National Academy of Design. Ferrer School, San Francisco
- Known for: Painting

Robert Brackman (September 25, 1898 – July 16, 1980) was an American artist and teacher, best known for large figural works, portraits, and still lifes.

== Biography ==
Robert Brackman was born on September 25, 1898, in Odessa, Russian Empire (now in Ukraine). He immigrated to the United States in 1908 or 1910.

Brackman studied at the National Academy of Design from 1919 to 1921, and the Ferrer School in San Francisco. From 1931, he had a long career teaching at the Art Students League of New York where he was a life member. He also taught at the American Art School in New York City, the Brooklyn Museum School, the Lyme Academy College of Fine Arts, and the Madison Art School in Connecticut. In 1932, Brackman was elected into the National Academy of Design as an Associate member, and became a full member in 1940.

He painted portraits of John D. Rockefeller Jr., Abby Aldrich Rockefeller, Charles Lindbergh, and John Foster Dulles, as well as portraits commissioned by the United States Air Force Academy and the State Department.

He painted a portrait of actress Jennifer Jones for use as a prop in the 1948 film Portrait of Jennie, where it represents a portrait painted by the character of Eben Adams (Joseph Cotten).

The American artist Elaine Hamilton was a student of Brackman., as were Itshak Holtz and Raymond A. Whyte.

Brackman was married to Rochelle Post; they later divorced. He had two daughters with his second wife, Francis R. Davis, whom he met in 1935 while teaching at the Minneapolis School of Fine Arts, now known as the Minneapolis College of Art and Design. He died on July 16, 1980, in Noank, Connecticut.

== See also ==
- List of artists who created paintings and drawings for use in films
