= B. Gerald Cantor =

American businessman (1916–1996)

Bernard Gerald Cantor
- Born: December 17, 1916; New York City, US
- Died: July 3, 1996 (aged 79); Los Angeles, California, US
- Education: New York University
- Known for: Founder of Cantor Fitzgerald
- Spouse(s): Leona (divorced), Iris Bazel

Bernard Gerald Cantor (December 17, 1916 – July 3, 1996) was an American investment banker who was the founder and chairman of securities firm Cantor Fitzgerald.

== Career ==
Cantor's parents were Rose (née Schwaidelson) and Julius Cantor, Jewish immigrants from Belarus. Born in the Bronx on December 17, 1916, Cantor attended DeWitt Clinton High School. He and his first wife, Leona (deceased) had one son, Jay, who chose not to follow his father into the financial world.

Cantor studied law and finance at New York University between 1935 and 1937 and soon afterwards became a securities analyst on Wall Street. After serving in the army in the South Pacific during the Second World War, he established B.G. Cantor and Company, which would later become Cantor Fitzgerald L.P., a New York City-based partnership that was among the biggest institutional brokers of Government securities in the United States. He stepped down in December 1995 because of declining health. He was also a co-owner of the Kansas City Kings of the National Basketball Association for a time.

== Art collection ==
After he married Iris Bazel in 1977 the couple became among the most important benefactors of fine art in New York through the founding of the Iris and B. Gerald Cantor Foundation. During his life, along with his wife, Cantor assembled the world's largest private collection of works by Auguste Rodin. Between 1981 and 1984, part of the Cantor Rodin collection was displayed in a private museum beside Cantor's 105th-floor offices in the World Trade Center. Much of the collection was donated to over 70 art institutions worldwide, such as the Los Angeles County Museum of Art and the Iris & B. Gerald Cantor Center for Visual Arts at Stanford University. From 1984 to 1987, the Cantors gave 58 Rodins and the money to install them in the Iris and B. Gerald Cantor Gallery at the Brooklyn Museum of Art. The Cantors underwrote many art exhibitions and endowed galleries at the Metropolitan Museum of Art, including the popular Iris and B. Gerald Cantor Roof Garden, as well as a sculpture garden and his namesake museum at Stanford. According to the foundation, the total number of Rodin sculptures in the private Cantor collection was about 300, and that the total number of Rodin sculptures that had been given away by the Cantors or the foundation over the years was more than 450.

The Iris and B. Gerald Cantor Foundation continues to underwrite exhibitions. In 1997, the Morris Museum, Morristown, showed "Focus on Rodin: Selections From the Iris and B. Gerald Cantor Collection". "Rodin at Rockefeller Center: Sculpture from the Iris & B. Gerald Cantor Foundation" was mounted at the Rockefeller Center, New York, in 1998. Later, the exhibition "Rodin: A Magnificent Obsession" was organized and toured internationally by the foundation, travelling, among others, to Louisiana State University, Baton Rouge; Albany Institute of History & Art, Albany; Albright-Knox Art Gallery, Buffalo; and the Vancouver Art Gallery.

Cantor was a trustee of the Metropolitan Museum from 1985 to 1990. In later years, he was an honorary trustee and a member of the visiting committee for the museum's department of European sculpture and decorative arts. He was also a life trustee of the Los Angeles County Museum of Art from 1972 to 1985 and subsequently an honorary trustee.

Cantor was a patron of 20th Century Surrealist Raymond A. Whyte and had five of his works displayed in the Cantor-Fitzgerald offices during the September 11th terrorist attacks.

== Philanthropy ==
Cantor has donated to the College of the Holy Cross in Worcester, Mass., the UCLA Anderson School of Management, and Cornell University.

When the White House unveiled the redecorated Oval Office in 1993, it displayed a bronze cast of Rodin's "Thinker," which President Clinton had personally arranged to borrow from the Cantor collection. The Cantors also financed a sculpture garden at the White House in 1994. In 1995, he and his wife were awarded the National Medal of Arts.
