= Elaine Hamilton-O'Neal =

American painter (1920–2010)

Elaine Hamilton
- Elaine Hamilton, oil on canvas, 48"x28". Date unknown (probably between 1948 and 1952). Title unknown (if any).
- Born: Elaine Hamilton; October 13, 1920; Paradise, near Catonsville, Maryland
- Died: March 15, 2010 (aged 89); Woodstock, Maryland
- Education: Maryland Institute College of Art; Robert Brackman, Art Students League of New York; Diego Rivera, National Polytechnic Institute in Mexico City; Accademia di Belle Arti in Florence, Italy
- Known for: painting
- Notable work: Burst Beyond the Image 1960; Sans titre, 1960; Silent Space 1969
- Movement: realism, abstract expression, mural, action, lyrical abstraction
- Patrons: Michel Tapié de Céleyran

Elaine Hamilton-O'Neal (October 13, 1920 – March 15, 2010), professionally known as Elaine Hamilton, was an internationally known American abstract painter and muralist born near Catonsville, Maryland. She was professionally admired by the influential French critic Michel Tapié de Céleyran and exhibited internationally in solo and multiple-artist exhibits in the United States, Mexico, South Asia, Japan, and throughout Europe. She showed twice in the Venice Biennale and won first prize at the 1968 Biennale de Menton in France. She is known for the work of her final stylistic phase, known as action painting.

Hamilton is also a high mountain climber with over 30 years experience climbing the Himalayas. She had climbed K2, which is part of the Karakoram Range and known as the Savage Mountain due to the difficulty of ascent, with the second highest fatality rate among those who attempt to climb it. For every four people who have reached the summit, one has died trying. Over the years, Hamilton made nine different trips to different mountains of the Himalayas. She also visited the former kingdom of Sikkim as a guest of Tashi Namgyal, the ruling Chogyal (King) of Sikkim and the royal family.

For three decades, Hamilton traveled throughout India, Pakistan, the former kingdom of Sikkim (annexed by India in 1975) and Japan. In Pakistan in 1959, she was asked to produce work for an exhibition that was administered by the foreign minister of Pakistan. The ministries of Pakistan also gave her permission to make her first K2 expedition. This expedition resulted in the welcome realization of her individual artistic vision and the creation of her first completely abstract work, Burst Beyond the Image.

== Early years ==
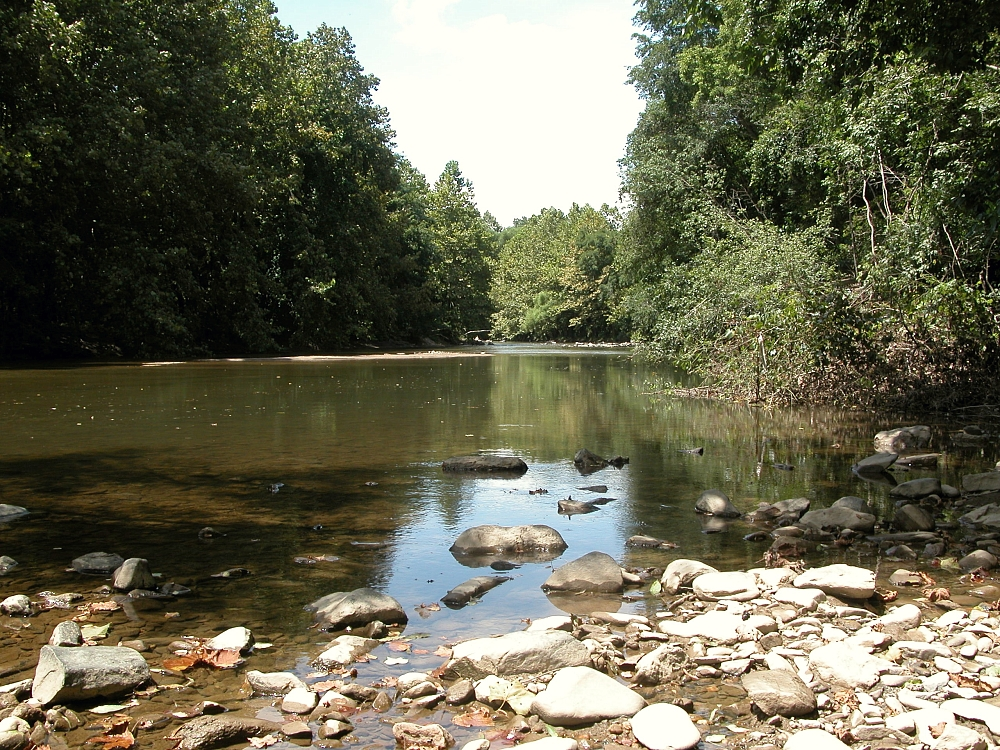
Patapsco River in Patapsco Valley State Park

Elaine Hamilton was born on October 13, 1920, to a middle-class family in Paradise, near Catonsville, Maryland. She was the daughter of Robert Bruce and Lee (née Wood) Hamilton. Paradise was home to her maternal grandparents, William and Caroline Wood. Hamilton was raised at Emerald Hill, the family estate in Daniels, along the Patapsco River, just north of Ellicott City.

Hamilton spent a portion of her childhood growing up near Orange Grove in the Patapsco Valley State Park. Orange Grove is a mill town that supported the flour mill on the Baltimore County side of the river. It is known as one of the most scenic areas of Patapsco. During the 1920s, for four or five months during the summer, the Hamilton family would set up camp in the area, which was a fashionable vacation spot for wealthy families at the time. The state park service encouraged middle class and working families to camp there for extended periods, "roughing it pleasantly" for their spiritual and physical refreshment.

Her experience at the park was a blend of rugged outdoor living complemented with the trappings of the modern middle-class lifestyle. The family slept on straw mattress cots under a canvas shelter and made several trips a day down to the local spring for fresh water, and yet, they cooked their meals on a modern oil stove, wired electric power in from Bloede's Dam, and brought their piano to the campsite to enjoy music played in their "living room" tent. They also walked over a mile once a week to nearby Orange Grove to buy their weekly groceries and supplies. By carving out a place to live in the wilderness, Hamilton asserted that she was able to develop self-confidence and a sense of adventure, and she "learned to be creative and inventive."

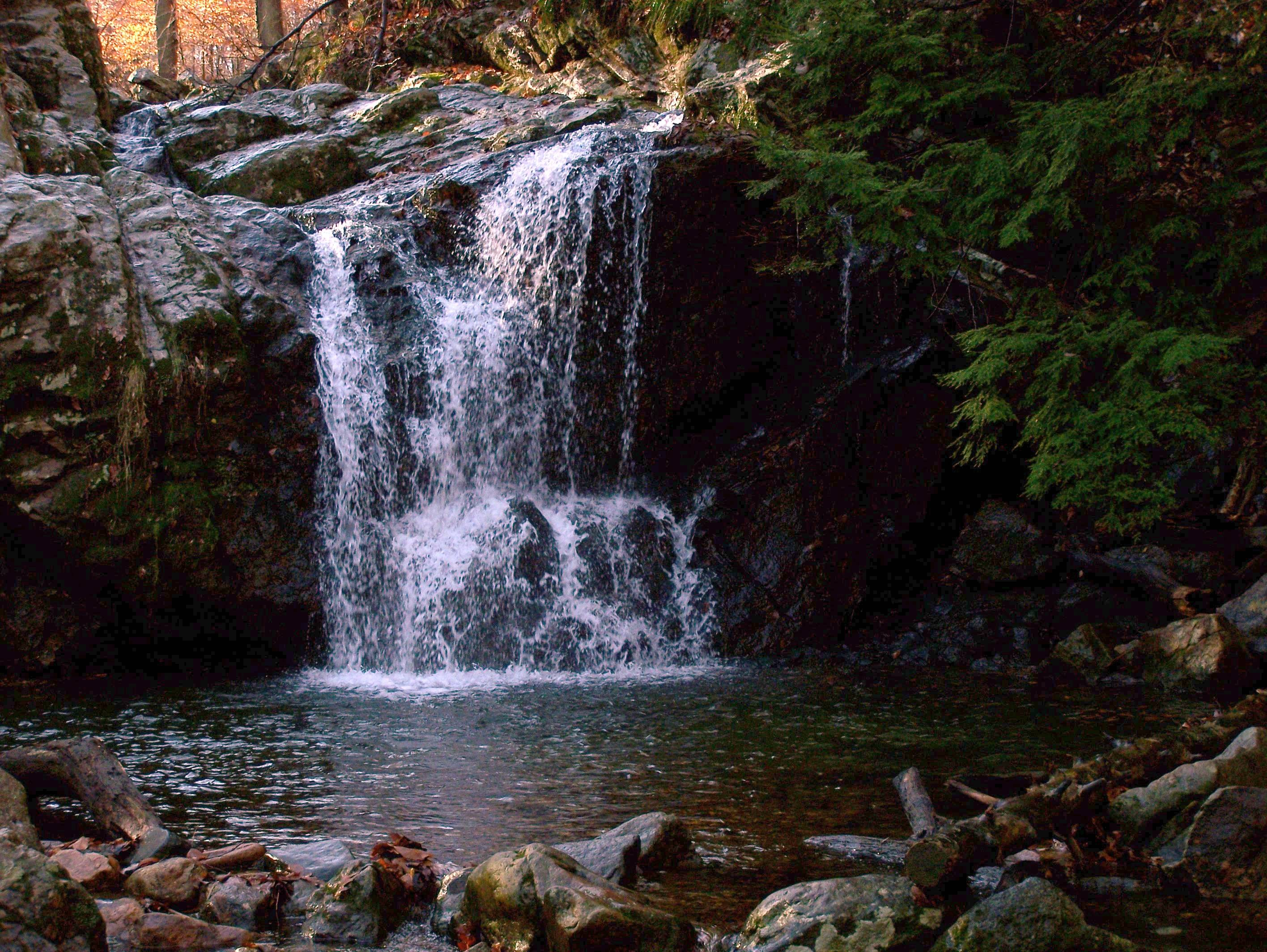
Cascade Falls Trail, Patapsco Valley State Park

At the park, Hamilton discovered how to paint and swim, and she developed an acute hearing ability and "a strong sense of smell." She learned to identify animal and bird sounds and how to avoid copperhead snakes. With only a few other children around, Hamilton developed a stronger relationship with her older brothers, Robert Jr. and Doug.

Summers at the park played a critical role in her eventual status as a Fulbright Scholar and career as an artist. In this sense, Hamilton's experience at Patapsco exemplified the white middle-class desire to identify with the rugged experience of the working classes while attaining the intellectual and cultural standards typified by the upper classes. Hamilton's experience at Patapsco State Park was both rugged and refined.

In her later years, Hamilton would often state that the one place throughout her life that most defined her, was the platform tent where her family lived each summer when she was a child.

=== Marriage ===
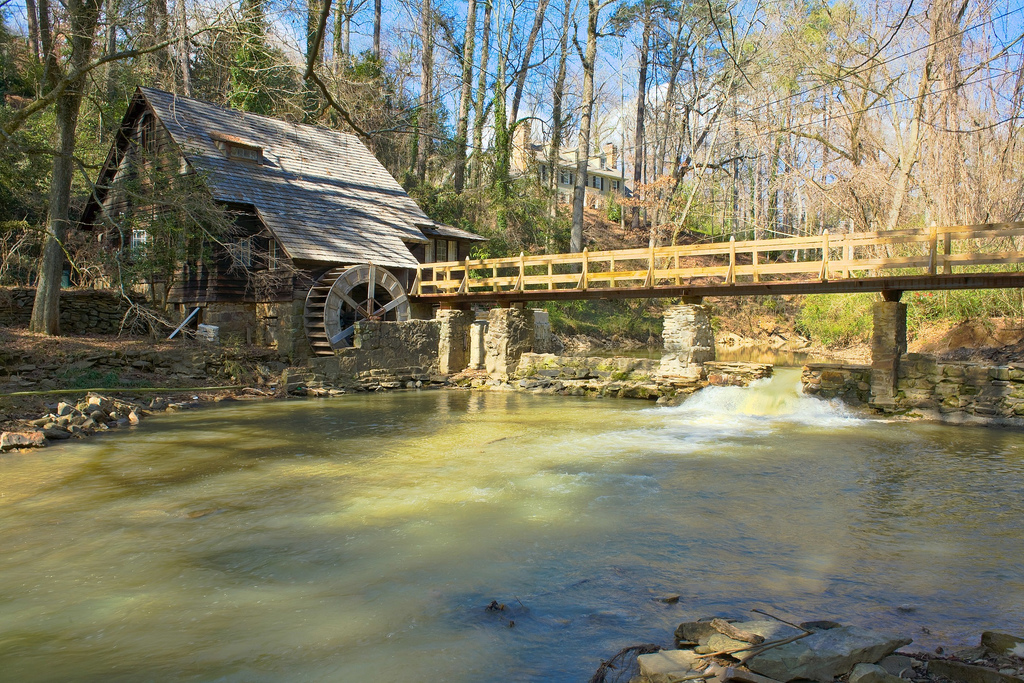
Old Shades Creek Mill in Mountain Brook, Alabama

In 1942, Hamilton met William O'Neal. They were married, soon after being introduced at a black-tie dinner at the Baltimore Country Club. O'Neal was not present for most of his wife's exploits, instead supporting her "morally and physically," from afar, she says, while he worked in the aerospace industry in Alabama.

Throughout their marriage, the O'Neals mostly lived apart, and they had no children. "We discussed these things before we were married," says Hamilton. "We laid out our lives. We understood each other. Neither one of us wanted to be 50 percent in our work and 50 percent parents. We wanted to be 100 percent of whatever we were."

In 1952, Hamilton and her husband, Bill O'Neal, purchased the Old Shades Creek Mill in Mountain Brook, Alabama. However, international exhibits continued to take Hamilton from one city to the next. Hamilton described her relationship with O'Neal in her last interview in the Baltimore Magazine. While Hamilton was on world tours, O'Neal "was working to put the first man on the moon," says Hamilton. He was initially based in Baltimore, employed by the Glenn L. Martin Company (now Lockheed Martin), though he traveled frequently and finally ended up in Birmingham.

In the early 1960s, Hamilton moved to Paris. In 1971, Hamilton purchased a chateau in France, where she lived and worked for the next 30 years. In the meantime, O'Neal continued to maintain the home at the Old Mill, which meandered alongside the edge of Shades Creek in Mountain Brook. Built in 1926, the Old Mill remains a symbol of the City of Mountain Brook and is depicted in the city's official seal.

Despite the geographic distance, Hamilton says they were close. Hamilton lived in her chateau in France, dropping everything, she says, "when my husband and his cronies would fly over for a French holiday. I'd cook and entertain them, and then they'd fly back." In turn, Hamilton would fly to Birmingham, where her husband had settled to work at Hayes Aircraft as vice president of engineering. Hamilton enjoy her trips back to Mountain Brook, where she would gracefully act as hostess, entertaining some of the most prominent scientists in early aerospace engineering.

== Educational background ==
Main building at the Maryland Institute College of Art (MICA)

In 1945, Hamilton graduated from Maryland Institute (now MICA) and went on to study for two years with Robert Brackman in New York as a member of the Art Students League.

In 1949, Hamilton continued her education at the National Polytechnic Institute in Mexico City. She studied under the mentorship the muralist Diego Rivera. While there, she received a commission of her own and began working on a 47-foot mural she painted for the privately owned Instituto Allende in San Miguel de Allende.

Hamilton dismisses any comparisons to her contemporaries or artists who worked in the first half of the 1900s. She was not interested in Picasso, she says, and while she admired the work of José Clemente Orozco and Diego Rivera, she mainly wanted to learn the techniques required for outdoor murals.

By the time Hamilton went to Mexico in 1949, she'd been married for seven years. In 1951, Hamilton returned to Baltimore, to present a solo exhibition at the Baltimore Museum of Art. In 1952, she traveled to Italy on a Fulbright Scholarship to study painting at the Accademia di Belle Arti in Florence, Italy. In 1953, when the Fulbright grant was extended for another year, she chose to remain in Italy for seven more years. After exhibiting in Rome, Milan, and at the Venice Bienniale, she found herself drawn to the Himalayas.

=== Himalayas ===
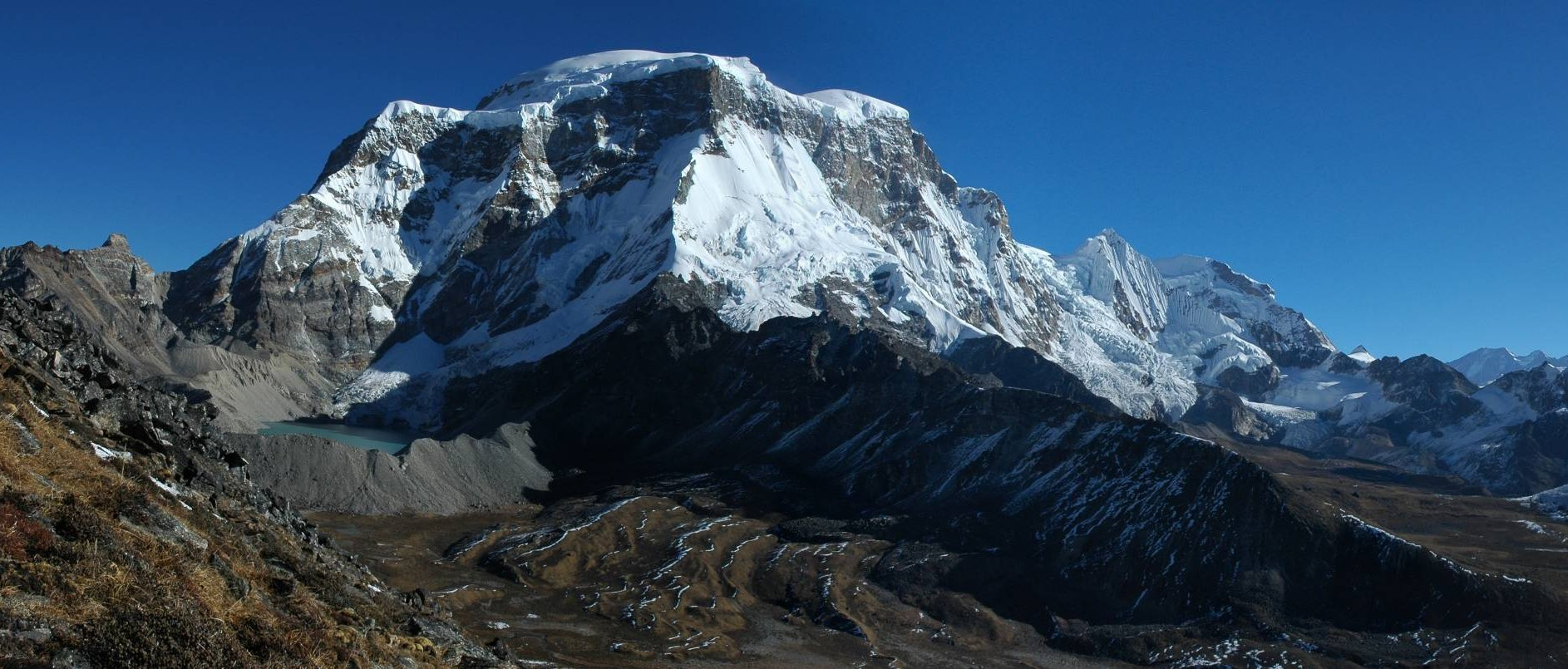
Mountains of North Sikkim

The Himalayas are a mountain range in Asia, separating the Indian subcontinent from the Tibetan Plateau. By extension, it is also the name of a massive mountain system that includes the Karakoram, the Hindu Kush, and smaller ranges that extend out from the Pamir Knot. Together, the Himalayan mountain system is home to the world's highest peaks, which include Mount Everest and K2, which is part of the Karakoram Range.

The mountains have profoundly shaped the cultures of South Asia; many Himalayan peaks are sacred in Hinduism, Buddhism, and Sikhism. K2 is known as the Savage Mountain due to the difficulty of ascent, with the second highest fatality rate among those who attempt to climb it. For every four people who have reached the summit, one has died trying. Unlike Annapurna, the mountain with the highest fatality rate, K2 has never been climbed in winter.

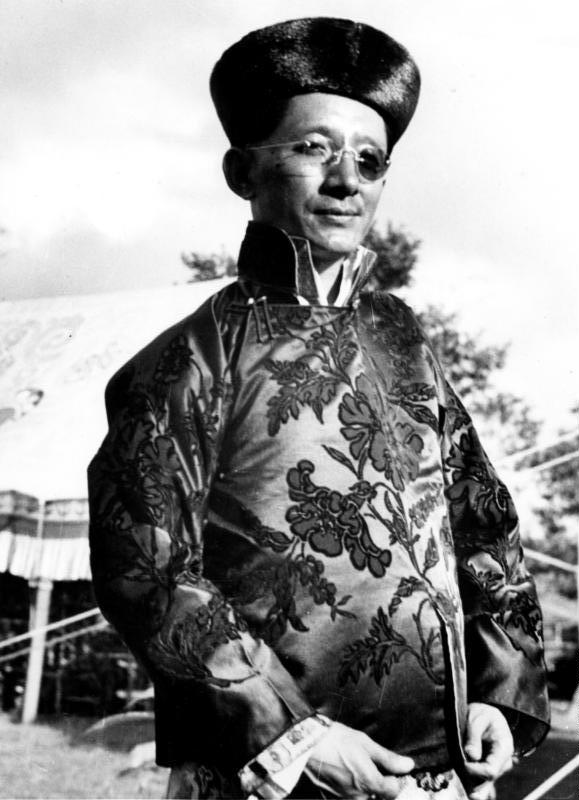
Tashi Namgyal, the ruling Chogyal (King) of Sikkim from 1914 to 1963.

Hamilton explained her draw to the high mountain country in Pakistan in no uncertain terms. "I wanted to see where the earth and the sky touched," she said. Over the years, she made nine different trips to different mountains of the Himalayas. She also visited the former kingdom of Sikkim as a guest of Tashi Namgyal, the ruling Chogyal (King) of Sikkim and the royal family.

Namgyal was the 11th ruler of the Namgyal dynasty of Sikkim. He was born in Tibet and crowned by the 13th Dalai Lama, Thubten Gyatso, he was a strong advocate for closer links with India. On his death in 1963, he was succeeded as Chogyal by his son Palden Thondup Namgyal, with whom Hamilton maintained close ties. Legend has it that the Buddhist saint Guru Rinpoche visited Sikkim in the 9th century, introduced Buddhism and foretold the era of the monarchy. It was here, in Sikkim, where Hamilton was introduced to Buddhism. She maintained a close fondness for the country and its people, choosing to return every year for 30 years.

Of her expeditions over the years to K2 and Everest, she writes, "I often return to the 'Abode of the Snows' for it seems there my thoughts crystallize into forms that find their way into the movements, rhythms, pulsating in and out of my canvases."

During these years, Hamilton was exposed to and influenced by early Sienese and later Renaissance painting, especially Giotto's use of space that inspired her move toward abstraction. Hamilton lived in Florence with her paintings displayed in Rome, Venice, Milan, and Florence. While she would return to Maryland almost annually for visits and exhibitions of her work, she remained in Europe and ended up spending the rest of her career abroad.

== Professional background ==
Elaine Hamilton, oil on canvas, 48"x28". Date unknown (probably between 1948 and 1952). Title unknown (if any).

Stylistically, Hamilton passed through a number of stages. Her work evolved from realistic portraiture in the 1940s to pure abstraction in the 1960s and thereafter. Having won the prize for portrait painting at the Maryland Institute College of Art in 1945, it was natural that she went on to study in New York with Robert Brackman, who is a master of realistic portraitures and other figurative painting.

In the late 1940s to early 1950s, the influence of Diego Rivera is evident in the earthy textures and colors, as well as in the heavy, sculpted, quasi-cubist forms of her increasingly abstract paintings (see right). Meanwhile, the scale of her work increased, also as a result of her study with Rivera.

In the early 1950s there are other canvases that show nightmarish, contorted, bloody-looking images suggestive of slaughter, but unidentifiable bodies or body parts, somewhat in the manner of Francis Bacon. One painting shows a man with massive hands folded on his knees. Others, in a transitional stage of her work, are broken into planes, cubist-style. A painting from Mexico, which she says is the dead child of her maid, is a shadowy face, surrounded by leaves and swirls in deep shades of crimson.

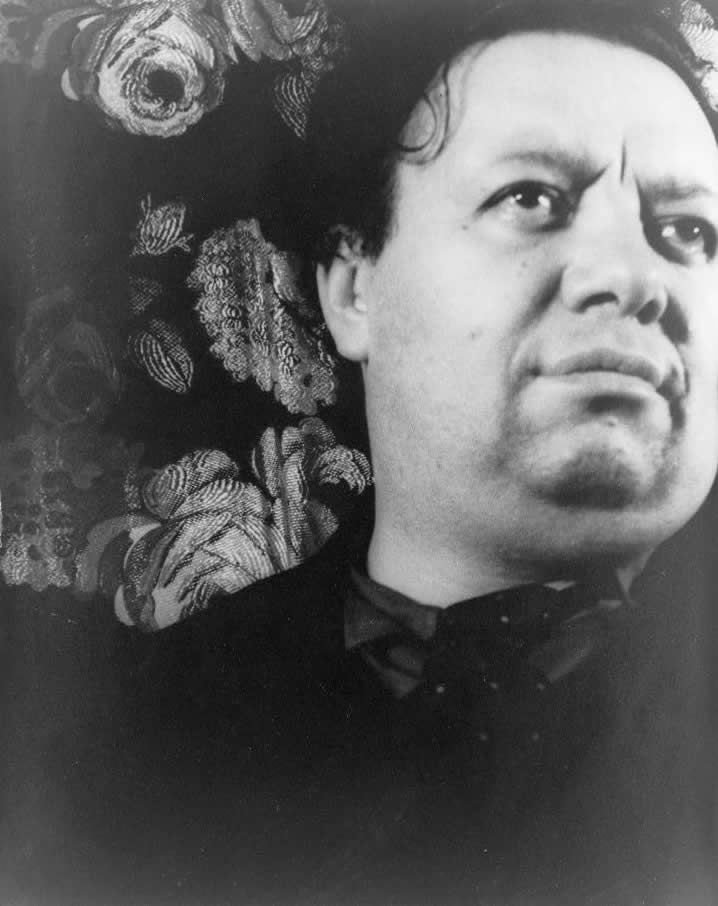
Portrait of Diego Rivera, 19 March 1932

During the 1950s and 1960s, Hamilton exhibited her paintings throughout Italy at the Venice Biennale, Rome, and Milan, as well as the Uffizi Gallery in Florence. She also exhibited at the Pakistan Arts Council in Karachi. Seven years later, she found herself drawn to the Himalayas. In 1956 and again in 1958, Hamilton was an invited exhibitor at the Venice Biennale. During her extensive travels in the 1950s, she remained prominent in the Baltimore contemporary art scene, winning the Popular Prize in the Baltimore Museum of Art's Maryland Artists Exhibition in 1952 and again in 1959.

Hamilton had solo exhibitions of her work in major galleries and museums all over the world. The various cities that exhibited her work includes Rome; Milan; Turin, Italy; Florence, Italy; Mexico City; Osaka; Tokyo; and Karachi, Pakistan. She was featured in numerous multi-artist exhibitions in these cities as well as in Paris, the Whitney Museum in New York City, and the Corcoran Gallery in Washington, DC.

Around 1960, she took up a personal approach to action painting and it is for her paintings in this later, abstract expressionist manner that she is probably best known. She is sometimes classed as a lyrical abstractionist. In 1968, she won first prize in the Biennale de Menton in France.

As Hamilton's presence in the art world continued to grow, visual art students looked to her for inspiration. Her influence extends across Europe and around the world. One individual in particular was a young Pakistani artist, named Ismail Gulgee (or Guljee, as it is sometimes spelled). Partha Mitter wrote of Hamilton's influence in her book, Indian Art, published by the Oxford University Press. "Impressed by the visiting American painter Elaine Hamilton, Guljee enthusiastically plunged into action painting..." Jane Turner also wrote of Hamilton's influence on Gulgee in The Dictionary of Art. "In 1960, Ismail Gulgee, known for his portraiture, began experimenting with non-objective painting (in the manner of Jackson Pollock) after working with visiting American artist, Elaine Hamilton." According to David L. Craven, Distinguished Professor of Art History at the University of New Mexico, Hamilton became something of an ambassador in South Asia: "Abstract expressionism was promoted as a universal style in Pakistan during the 1950s by a U.S. artist named Elaine Hamilton."

While Hamilton was living in France, she gained the professional admiration and support of Michel Tapié de Céleyran, who was a highly influential French critic and respected painter. Tapié was an early advocate of European Abstraction Lyrique, also known as tachisme, which is generally regarded as the European equivalent of abstract expressionism. He was descended from an old, aristocratic French family; notably, he was the second cousin of the painter Henri de Toulouse-Lautrec.

Tapié was a generous critic, championing the works of young and upcoming artists. He organized and curated scores of exhibitions of new and modern art in major cities all over the world. In 1952, Tapié was the curator of Jackson Pollock's solo exhibition in Paris, which took place at the Studio Paul Facchetti.

The French lyrical abstractionist or tachiste, Georges Mathieu was another artist of whom Tapié was an early champion. In 1952, Tapié curated Mathieu's exhibit at the Stable Gallery in New York. Mathieu studied literature and philosophy before switching to art at the age of twenty-one. After painting realistic landscapes and portraits, he developed a highly distinctive Abstract Expressionist personal style, which grew out of an emotionally driven, improvised and intuitive act of painting. He was often compared to Pollock and said of the artist, that he considered him to be the "greatest living American painter."

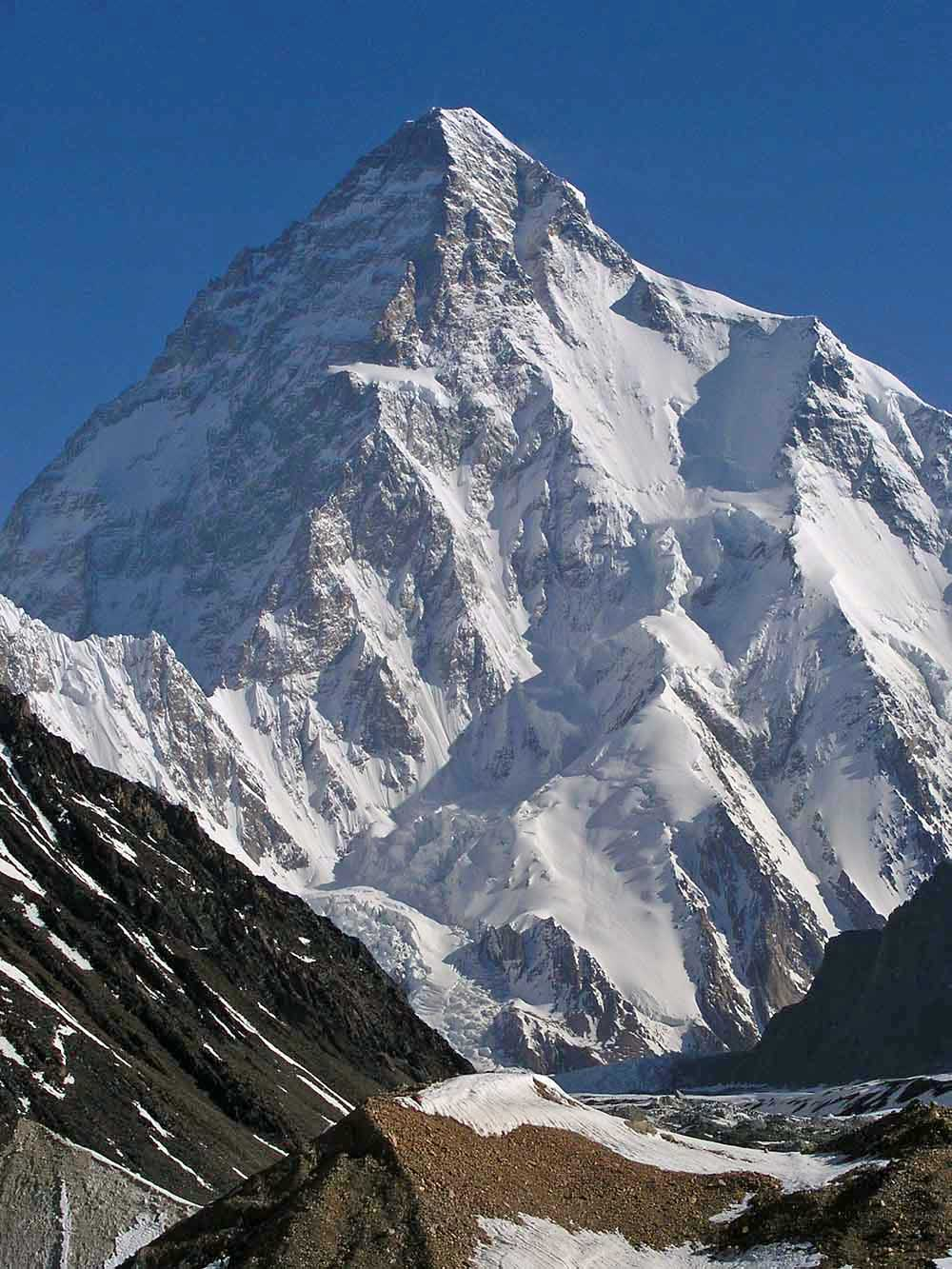
K2 in the Karakoram Range of the Himalayas

Tapié co-founded the International Center of Aesthetic Research in Turin, Italy in 1960, with architect Luigi Moretti. The Center was a facility for the study and exhibition of art, as well as for the publication and dissemination of critical, investigative, or theoretical works on art. The institution lasted until 1987, ending upon the death of Tapié.

In 1960, Hamilton created her first purely oil on canvas abstract painting, entitled Burst Beyond the Image, after an expedition to K2 in Pakistan. This painting was Hamilton's foray into the abstract world of action painting, which dramatically records the gestural action of painting itself. Today, the painting remains in Hamilton's personal collection.

In late 1960, full of inspiration after her most recent Himalayan adventure, upon her return to France, she quickly created many more of these huge "action" canvases in preparation for solo and group exhibitions in Japan. About this time, Hamilton caught the attention of Tapié and became the benefactor of his generosity when he exhibited her paintings at the Fujikawa Gallery in Osaka, Japan. The exhibit took place from April 12–18, 1961 and was presented in collaboration with the Gutai Group, which was an association of avant-garde artists representative of Japan's post-war art world. A second showing curated by Tapié was presented at the International Center of Aesthetic Research in Turin, Italy.

The 2006, Benezit Dictionary of Artists is emphatic in its praise, stating the following of Hamilton. "A globetrotter who has scaled the heights of the Himalayas, Hamilton makes profoundly serious work. Clearly part of the movement known as 'lyrical gestural abstraction', her painting is full of verve and invention and manifests an extraordinary gift for colour and substance."

Touring her home in 2009, Martha Thomas, writer with the Baltimore Magazine, was able to view Hamilton's many works within the artist's private collection. Rather than hanging on the walls, Hamilton's earlier paintings were found resting safely stacked against them.

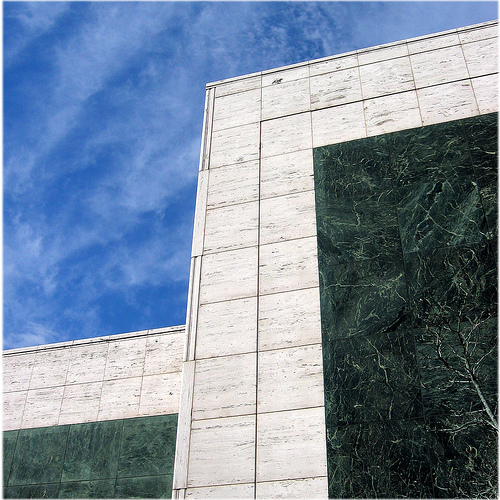
Birmingham (Alabama) Museum of Art, where Hamilton's work is represented

Most of the paintings on display in Hamilton's lower level gallery were her later works: bright and energetic splashes of color with swirls, drips, and slashes of paint on canvases measuring six feet long and four or five feet high. A few of the canvases were round. Hamilton stated that she wanted to challenge herself and "get out of the square thing." In some, color bursts from the center like a supernova against a dark background. In others, the fury of colorful strokes completely covers the canvas.

Her work has been described as abstract expressionism and "action painting," but Hamilton says the Buddhist monks she knew in Tibet described it best: "It's meditation in action," she says. "That's not a contradiction. When you meditate, it doesn't mean empty. It's making space for things to come in."

Hamilton sustained and developed the abstract approach to painting for the rest of her life. Today, her work is represented in the Birmingham Museum of Art in Alabama. Her oil on canvas work entitled, Silent Space, which was completed c. 1969 is part of the collection belonging to Sarfaraz Aziz, who is the director of the brokerage firm of Aziz Fidahuesin & Company in London. Other pieces remain in public and private collections in Austria, France, Germany, India, Italy, Mexico, Pakistan, Switzerland and the United States.

== Retirement years ==
In a November 2009 article written by Martha Thomas of the Baltimore Magazine, Hamilton shared her life stories and generously offered a tour of her home, personal collection of artwork, artifacts and souvenirs of a life well lived.

Throughout her life, Hamilton called a variety of places "home". At one time while in France, she owned a 42-room chateau, filled with fine art and antiques. She eventually downsized to the warmth of a quaint French chateau with just 18 rooms.

Hamilton lived in apartments in Florence and New York, in a tent at the Mount Everest base camp, and when she was in Mexico City, she was housed by the Rotary Club of Houston, Texas. After returning to America, Hamilton and her husband lived together in an historic, converted grist mill in Mountain Brook, southwest of Birmingham, Alabama.

In 2002, the couple decided to sell the Old Mill and move to Maryland, where they would live together after so many years. On the day after their 60th wedding anniversary, as the couple prepared to move, Bill went to the doctor to have his ears checked. Upon further examination, he was transferred to the hospital emergency room. He died of heart failure that day.

Hamilton continued on to Maryland, as planned, to live close to her family. She described her brothers as wonderful friends, and she also had strong bonds with her nieces and nephews. "I had always told them that if they ever wanted to run away, they could run to me," says the aunt. "I was far away, and safe." She also had space for guests. "Sometimes too much space," she laughed.

In 2009, Hamilton got by with just one guest room, decorated in shades of green: painted twin beds with tasseled silk spreads she had made in France, with olive green Tibetan rugs on the hardwood floors. The walls carefully held relief rubbings from tombs in Pakistan.

At the end of her life, Hamilton was content living in Granite, near her childhood home. To Hamilton, her eight-room home felt like a piece of France, scooped up and replanted in the Emerald Hill countryside. The home had a brick façade, with Palladian windows, and a gravel drive leading up to the front door. It was expansive with noble proportions and high, stepped tray ceilings that she designed herself in the wide, one-story "Chartreuse" style, common in southern France.

A tour of her three-year-old home is a testament to a lifetime of adventure. "It's filled with souvenirs," she said. "It's a vagabond's house." She emitted a hearty bit of laughter from her small frame, her eyes sparkled behind thick glasses.

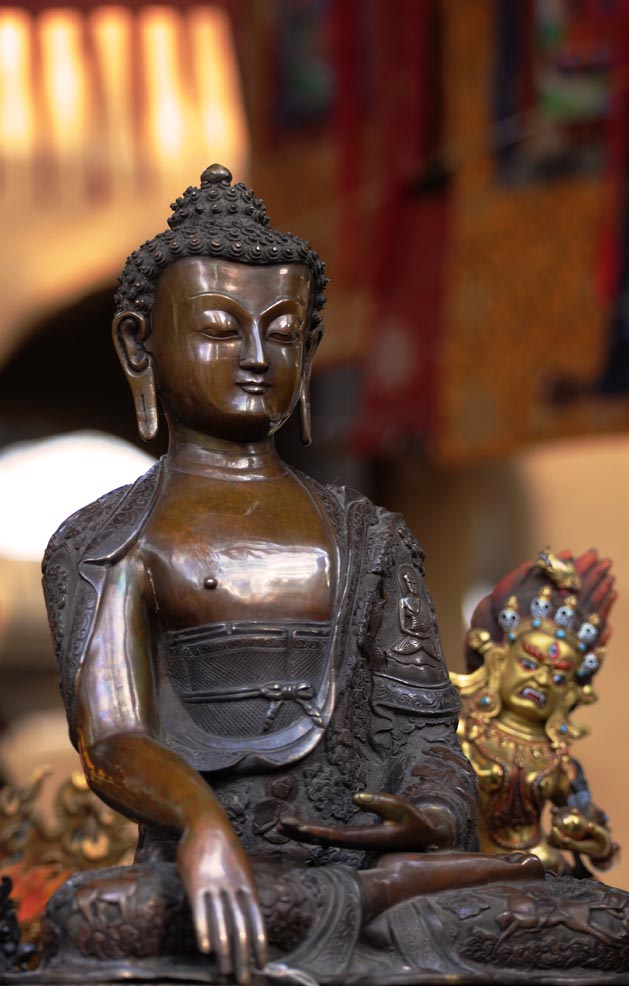
Bronze statue of Buddha at the Sikkim Pavilion

Her Louis XV sofas dated back to 1800 century and were adorned with hand-embroidered pillows from Pakistan. The Regency fireplace mantel—heavy marble carved in scrolls, which Hamilton shipped from France—displayed a bronze cat by the sculptor Antoine-Louis Barye, antique toys from India, and a pair of cloisonné vases (exported from Tibet on the back of a yak). Her dining room furniture dates to the Renaissance, the table embellished with a pair of sturdy brass candlesticks from the same period, which she bought for $200 as an art student in Florence. "They are the real thing," she notes. "A lot of people have sat in front of those."

Everywhere, there are rugs, many of them brightly colored in traditional Tibetan motifs and thick knotted-wool patterns of dragons, tigers, and flowers. In addition to rugs, skins from leopards and tigers—with heads intact—are draped over seats along the wall and low tables in Hamilton's meditation room, a sanctuary off the library. The room is dominated by a gilded, wood altar, running from floor to ceiling, with nooks holding various representations of the Buddha. The walls are painted according to tradition: the deep earth red around the base, moving through horizontal bands of orange and gold representing various stages of clarity, and finally a blue ceiling, signifying nirvana. "I've had this identical room in every house I've owned for the last 40 years," Hamilton says. "Everything in Buddhism is symbolic and has definite meaning." She warns: "Don't use the word décor."

Whether or not they can be classified as décor, photographs seem to be a fundamental feature in Hamilton's effects. If the furniture, paintings, objets d'art—and even her sacred space—are not enough evidence of her adventures, there are plenty of photos to round out the story. There is a shot of her mother, from 1920s with a feather boa-trimmed neckline and thick hair piled on her head; a photo of Hamilton making her way up an icy ledge in Pakistan's Karakoram range; and a picture of a Tibetan friend who is now a nurse in Pennsylvania by part to Hamilton's largesse.

Hamilton rushes through each story, knowing that there are so many more to tell. Perhaps suspecting a visitor's disbelief—or in most cases, awe—she flutters her hands toward the library or her bedroom and says, "Oh, I have photos of all that," promising to provide proof that her wondrous tales really happened.

In the gallery, which she had constructed with high ceilings and recessed lighting to showcase her large canvases, Hamilton sifts through scrapbooks and locates a spread from the May 13, 1951, edition of The Baltimore Sun Magazine, its edges yellowed and brittle. Hamilton appears on the cover, swirling a voluminous cape with the headline, "Baltimore's Lady Bullfighter." She explains: "I saw the bullfights [in Mexico] and was traumatized. They gave me migraines." Her solution? "I had to find out what it was all about," so she trained to enter the ring.

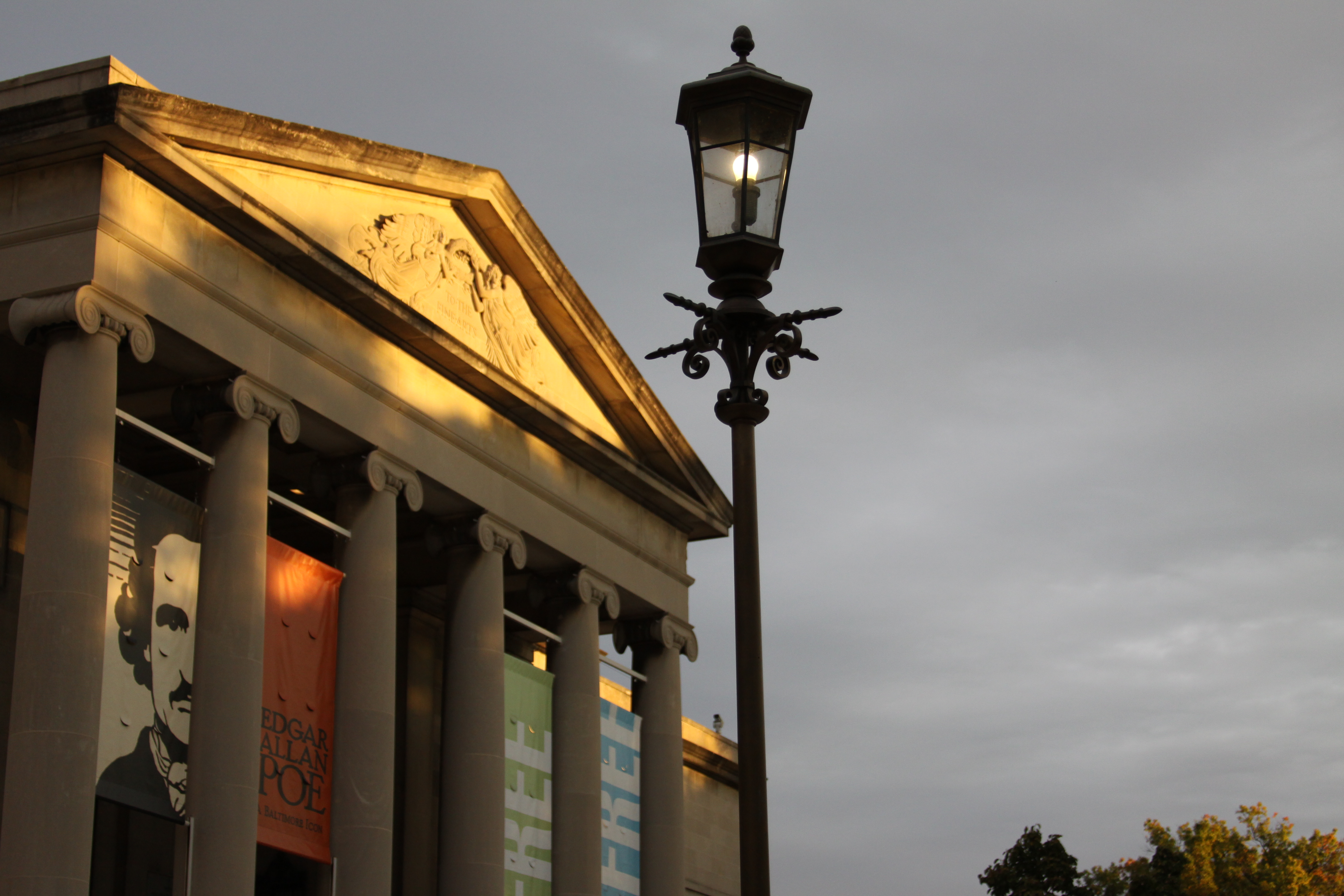
Baltimore Museum of Art on a fall morning

At first, she explains, bullfighters swing the cape in wide circles, but "then begin to bring the bull closer and closer," shortening the span of the red cloth. She describes the contest as a mythic challenge between strength and intellect that "equalizes life and death." Hamilton notes that she did not actually kill the bull, but she did emerge from the encounter sore and covered with bruises. "You don't even realize you're getting grazed at the time," she says, "but you come out all black and blue."

Returning to her scrapbook, she points out a program from a 1951 solo show at the Baltimore Museum of Art, and a magazine photo of her standing on scaffolding in Mexico City, working on a 47-foot mural she painted at the art institute in San Miguel de Allende, after assisting the muralist Diego Rivera.

On Monday, March 15, 2010, Elaine Hamilton O'Neal died in Woodstock, Maryland due to unknown causes. She stopped painting around 2004, due to eye problems, but otherwise remained in good health. In her latter years, she was involved in her community, through her membership in the Great Patapsco Community Association, as well as the local art museum. She was a regular supporter of Baltimore's Walters Art Museum, where her brother Douglas serves as Vice-President of the 2009–2010 Board of Trustees. The Walters Art Museum in Baltimore, Maryland is one of the finest small, privately formed art collections open to the public in the United States.

== Solo exhibitions ==
- Baltimore Museum of Art, 1951
- Instituto Allende, Mexico, 1952
- Galleria De Arte Moderno, Mexico City, 1952
- Galleria San Marco, Rome, Italy, 1954
- Marticks Gallery, Baltimore, 1955
- Galleria "l'Il Milione", Milan, 1958
- Arts Council of Pakistan, Karachi, Pakistan, 1960 (Invited Artist)
- Fujikawa Gallery, Osaka, Japan, 1961
- Minami Gallery, Tokyo, Japan, 1961
- Center of Aesthetic Research, Turin, Italy, 1967
- Gallery 31, Birmingham, Alabama, 1968
- Columbus Museum, Columbus, Georgia, 1968

== Multiple-Artist Exhibitions ==
- The Baltimore Museum of Art Exhibitions, 1948, 1949, 1950, 1951, 1952
- Corcoran Bi-Annual Exhibition, Washington, DC, 1951
- Baltimore Artists Exhibition, Peale Museum, 1951–52
- A.C.A. Gallery of New York, 1951–52
- Fulbright Artists Exhibition, Rome, 1954
- International Exhibition, Uffizi Gallery, Florence, Italy, 1955
- Venice Biennale International Art Exhibition, 1956 (Invited Artist)
- Venice Biennale International Art Exhibition, 1958 (Invited Artist)
- Fulbright Painters, Whitney Museum of New York, 1959 (Invited Artist)
- 10th Gutai Exhibition, Osaka, Japan, 1961 (Invited Artist)
- "Priz Marzotto" Exhibition, 1964 (Invited Artist)
- Salon de Mai, xxiII, Paris, France, 1966 (Invited Artist)
- Espaces Abstraits Exhibition, Stadler's Gallery, Paris, France, 1967
- First Prize, Biennale de Menton, France, 1968
- Centre de Services d'Information et de Relations Culturelles de l'Ambassade des Etats-Unis à Paris, 1969 (Three-man show)
- American Cultural Center of Paris, 1969

== Awards ==
- Portrait Prize, Maryland Institute, 1945
- Post-Graduate Fellowship Scholarship Award from the Maryland Institute, 1946
- First Prize, Peale Museum, 1951
- Popular Prize Award from The Baltimore Museum of Art Exhibition, 1952
- Mural Commission for the Instituto Allende, Mexico, 1952
- Fulbright Award in Painting to Italy, 1951
- Popular Prize, Maryland Artists Exhibition, Baltimore Museum of Art, 1959
- First Prize, Biennale de Menton, France, 1968
