= Meditation (Rodin) =

Sculpture by Auguste Rodin

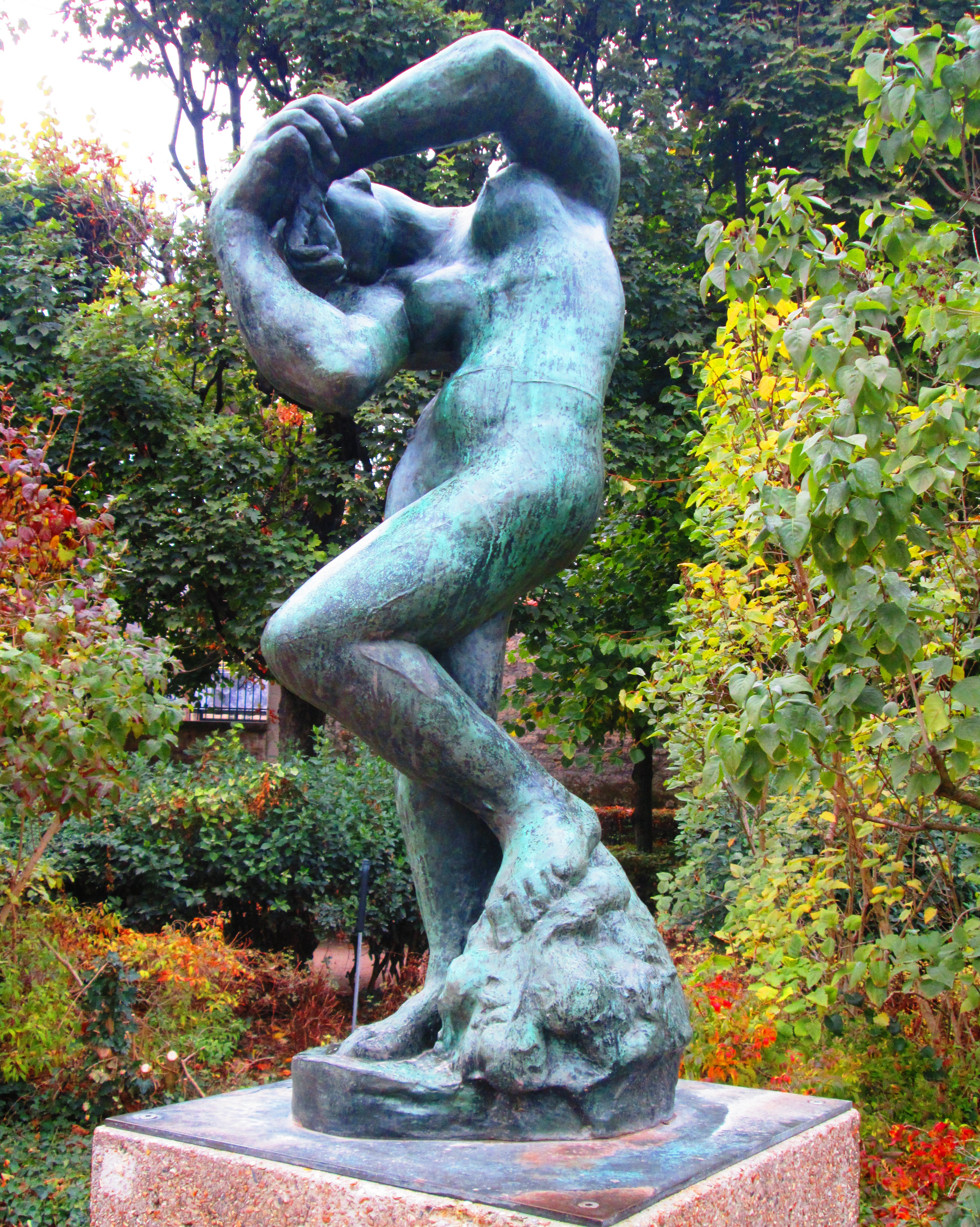
- A bronze cast in the garden of the Musée Rodin
- Artist: Auguste Rodin
- Year: 1886
- Type: Sculpture

Meditation or The Interior Voice is an 1886 sculpture by Auguste Rodin, showing a young woman resting her head on her right shoulder.

== Versions ==
The figure was also used on the right end of the tympanum of Rodin's The Gates of Hell, with a right hand added, extended in horror at the fate that awaits her in Hell.

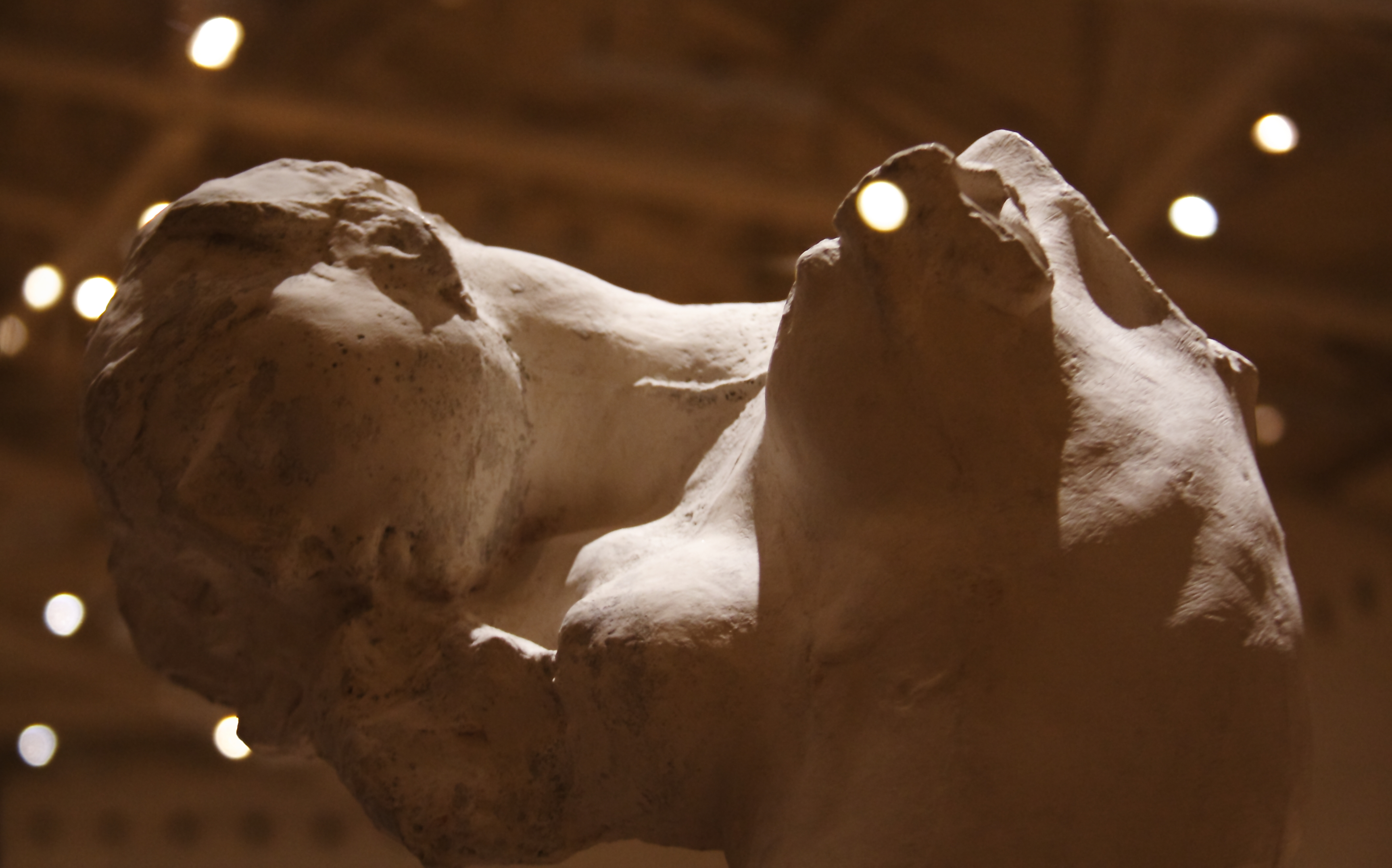
Detail of the work without arms at the Museo Soumaya.

The figure was also used in Rodin's Monument to Victor Hugo, representing one of the poet's muses. For Gates, Rodin cut off its arms, left knee and part of its right leg. He exhibited the plaster as an independent work in 1896.

== See also ==
- List of sculptures by Auguste Rodin
