= The Met Fifth Avenue =

Branch of art museum in New York City

The Metropolitan Museum of Art
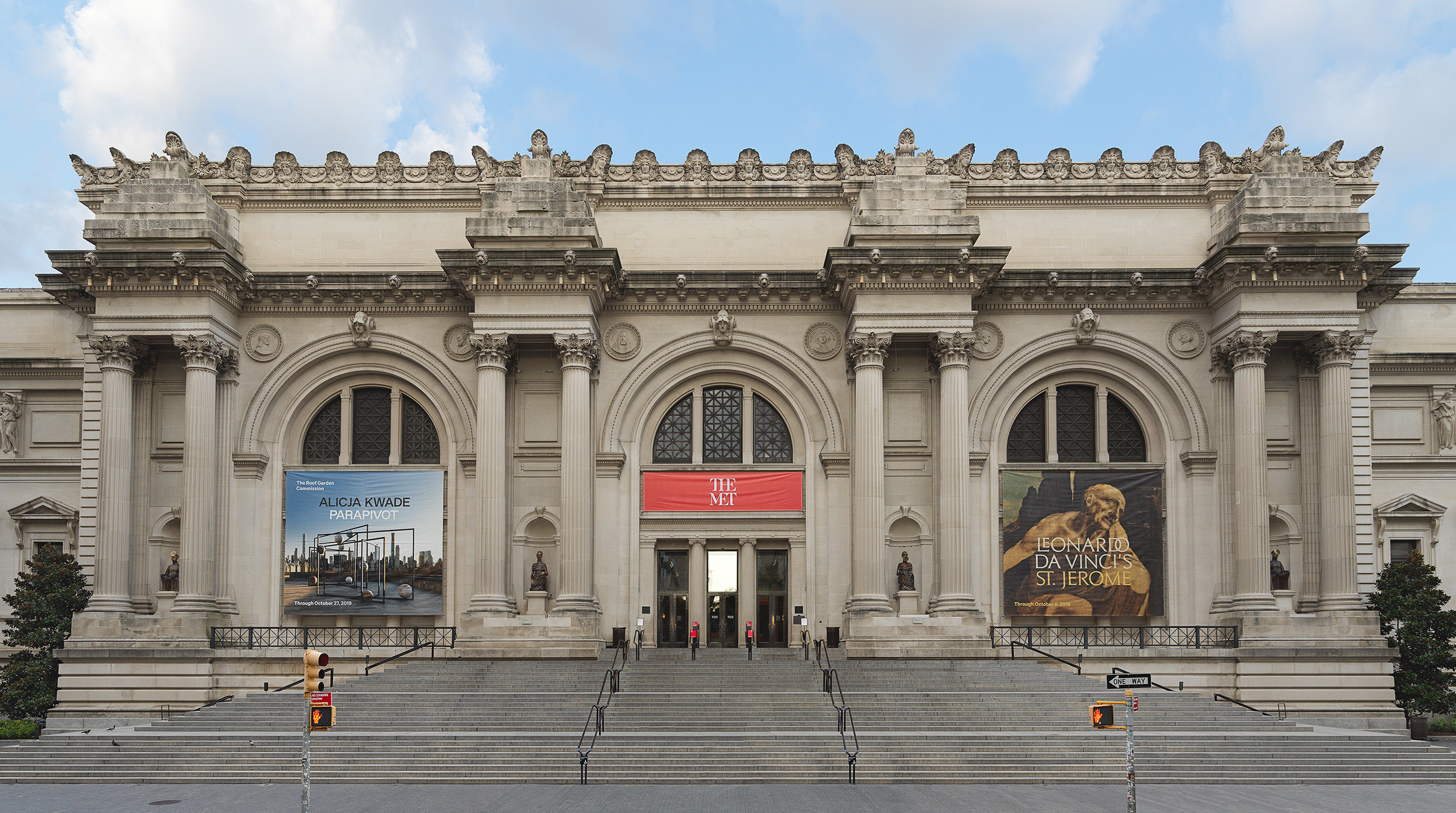
- Entrance facade
- Location: 1000 Fifth Avenue, Manhattan, New York City, U.S.
- Coordinates: 40.7794°N 73.9631°W
- Director: Max Hollein
- Public transit access: Subway: at 86th Street at 77th Street; Bus: M1, M2, M3, M4, M79, M86 SBS
- Website: Official website
- The Metropolitan Museum of Art
- U.S. National Register of Historic Places
- U.S. National Historic Landmark
- New York State Register of Historic Places
- New York City Landmark
- Built: 1880; 146 years ago
- Architect: Richard Morris Hunt; also Calvert Vaux; Jacob Wrey Mould
- Architectural style: Beaux-Arts
- NRHP reference No.: 86003556
- NYSRHP No.: 06101.000338
- NYCL No.: 0410, 0972

Significant dates
- Added to NRHP: January 29, 1972
- Designated NHL: June 24, 1986
- Designated NYSRHP: June 23, 1980
- Designated NYCL: June 9, 1967 (exterior); November 19, 1977 (interior)

The Met Fifth Avenue is the primary museum building for the Metropolitan Museum of Art in New York City. The building is located at 1000 Fifth Avenue, along the Museum Mile on the eastern edge of Central Park in Manhattan's Upper East Side. In December 2021, Agnes Hsu-Tang and her husband Oscar Tang donated $125 million towards renovations at the Metropolitan Museum of Art; the grant has since expanded to $500M USD for the new Tang Wing for Modern Art set for completion in 2030.

== History ==
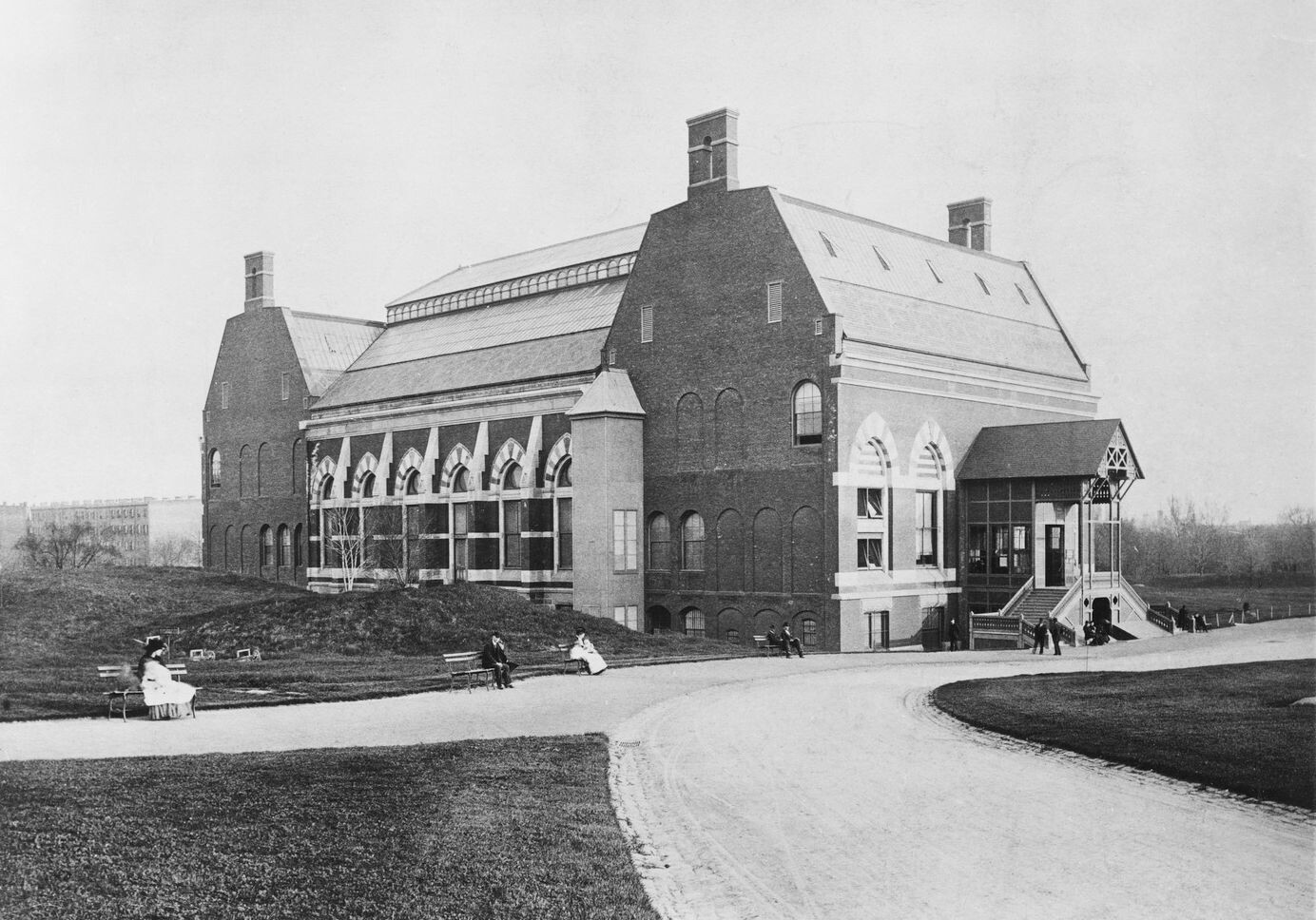
Original building designed by Vaux and Mould, built to support expansions

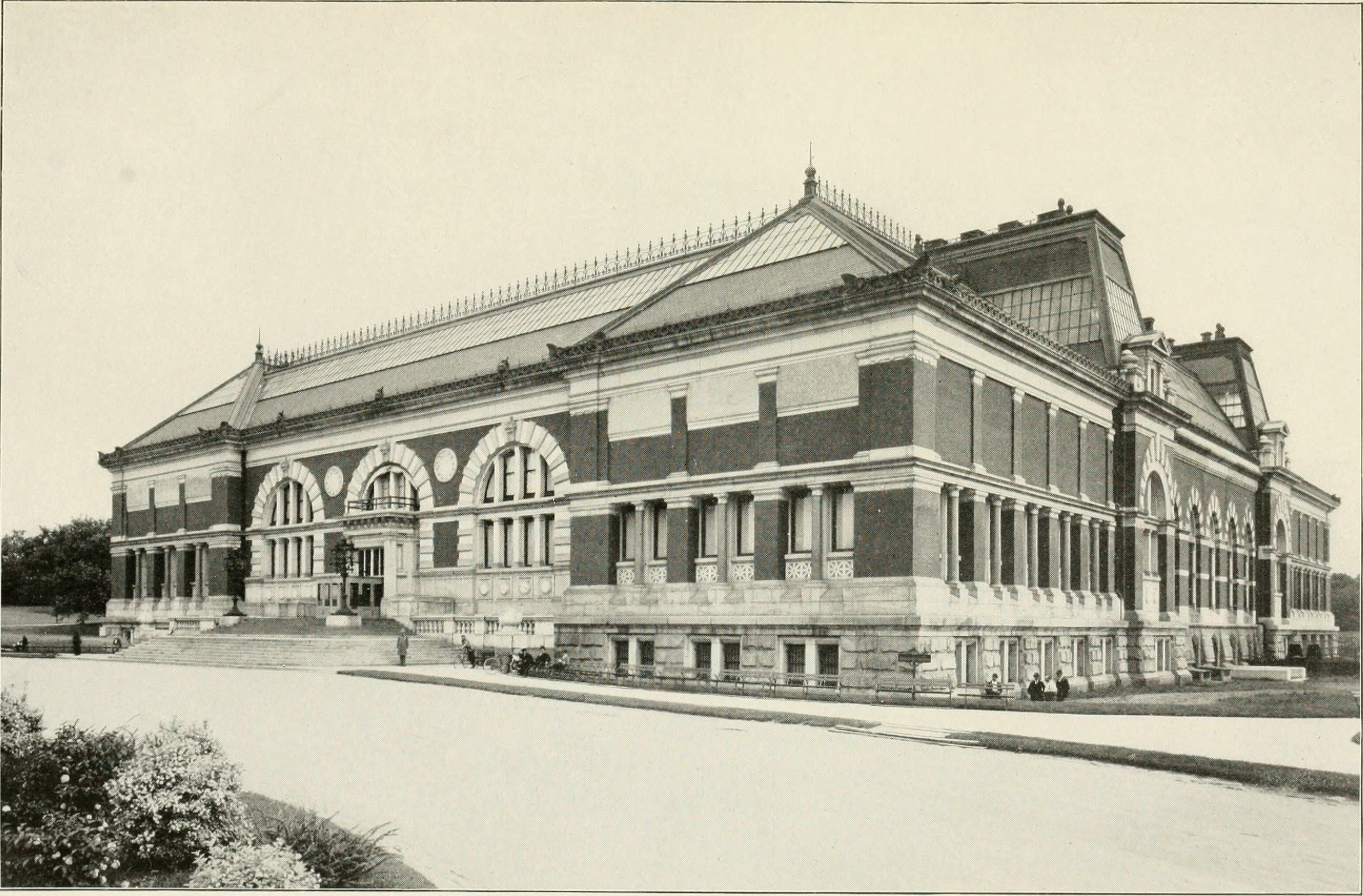
The building as constructed in 1888-94

After negotiations with the City of New York in 1871, the Met was granted the land between the East Park Drive, Fifth Avenue, and the 79th and 85th Street transverse roads in Central Park. A red-brick and stone building was designed by American architect Calvert Vaux and his collaborator Jacob Wrey Mould. The steel structure of the building was designed by London-born architects Edward C. and George K. Radford. Mould described Edward Radford as “an engineer of high scientific attainments to whom we entrusted the constructive portions of the iron work [i. e. the steel structure] of the building”. Vaux's ambitious building was not well received; the building was dubbed by critics as a "mausoleum", its High Victorian Gothic style was already considered dated prior to completion, and the president of the Met termed the project "a mistake".

Within 20 years, a new architectural plan engulfing the Vaux building was already being executed. Since that time, many additions have been made, including the distinctive Beaux-Arts Fifth Avenue facade, Great Hall, and Grand Stairway. These were designed by architect and Met trustee Richard Morris Hunt, but completed by his son, Richard Howland Hunt in 1902 after his father's death. The architectural sculpture on the facade is by Karl Bitter.

The wings that completed the Fifth Avenue facade in the 1910s were designed by the firm of McKim, Mead & White. The modernistic glass sides and rear of the museum are the work of Roche-Dinkeloo. Kevin Roche was the architect for the master plan and expansion of the museum for over 40 years. He was responsible for designing all of its new wings and renovations including but not limited to the American Wing, Greek and Roman Court, and recently opened Islamic Wing.

In 2024, initial building plans were released for a half a billion dollar architectural expansion to the SW corner of the MET Museum; the expansion was announced as being planned for completion by 2030. In 2026, the Condé M. Nast Galleries opened at the Met Fifth Avenue.

== Architecture ==
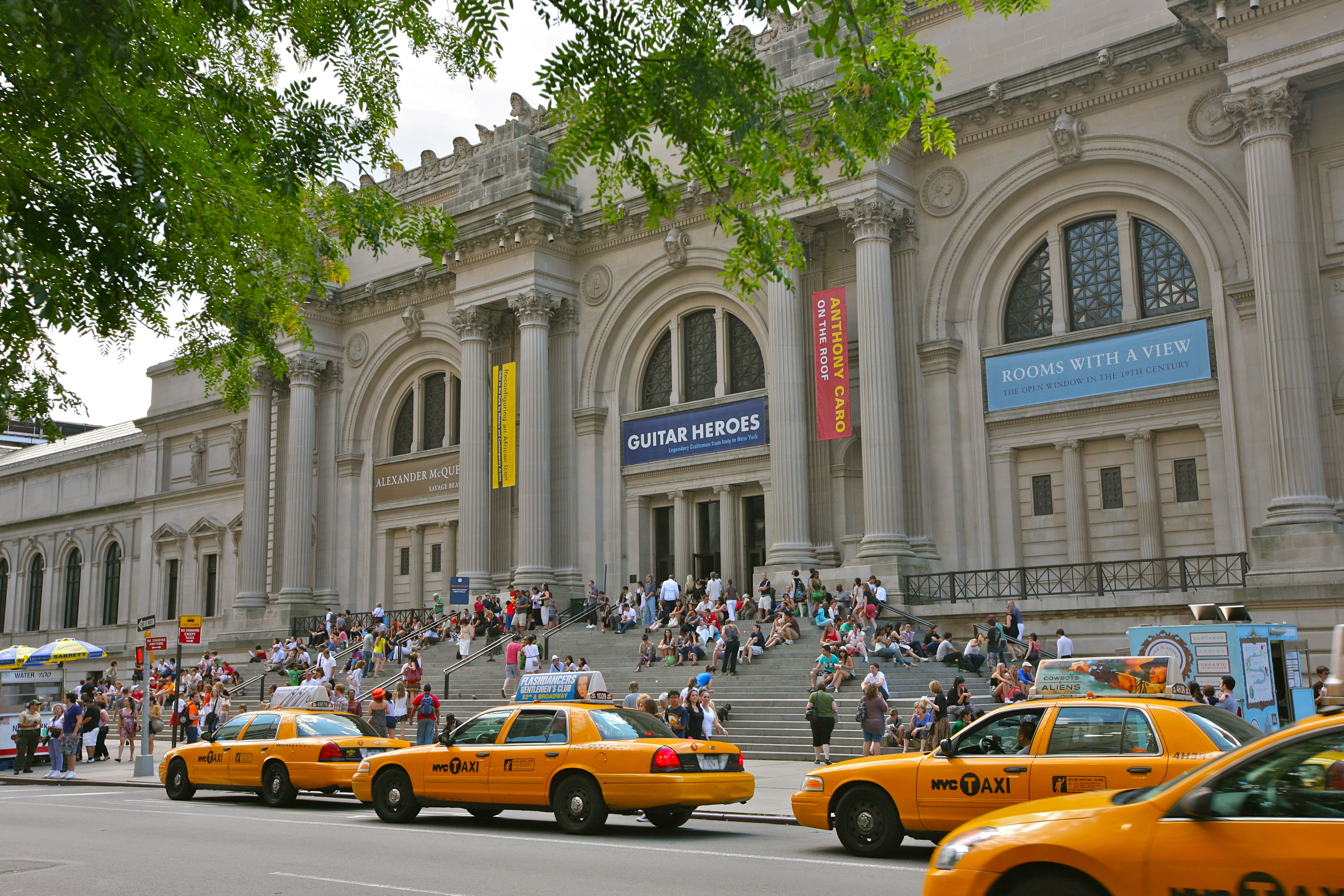
Street view of the Met

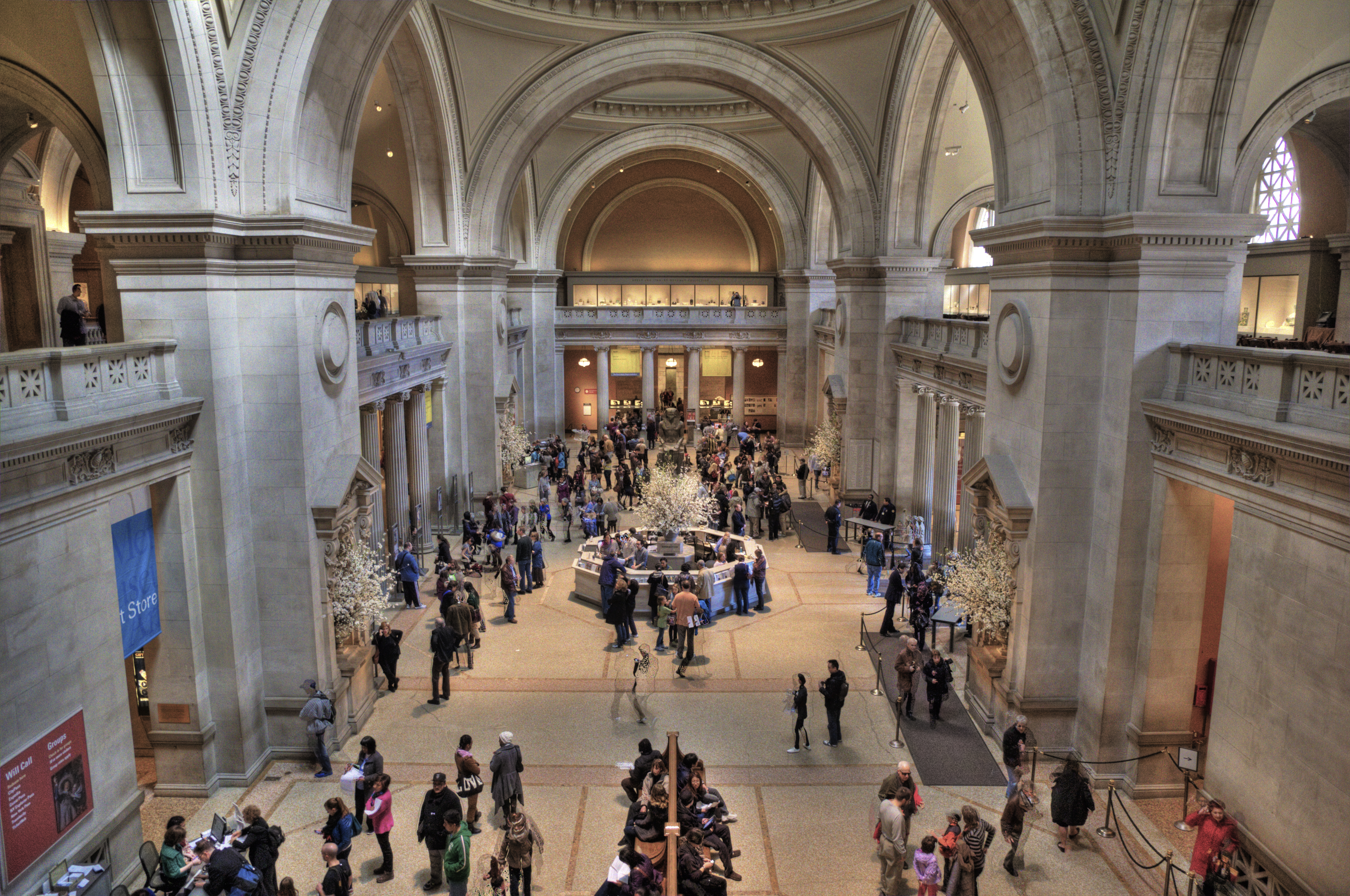
The Great Hall

The Met measures almost 1/4-mile (400 m) long and with more than 2 million square feet (190,000 m^{2}) of floor space, more than 20 times the size of the original 1880 building. The museum building is an accretion of over 20 structures, most of which are not visible from the exterior. The City of New York owns the museum building and contributes utilities, heat, and some of the cost of guardianship.

In the early 1890s, the Austrian-born sculptor Karl Bitter was selected to provide the sculptural motifs for the new building's monumental entrance facade. In the spandrels of the museum's central structure, he placed six portrait medallions of famed Renaissance artists Raphael, Michelangelo, Albrecht Dürer, Rembrandt, Donato Bramante, and Diego Velázquez. On the extensions flanking either side of the larger central structure, he also designed four caryatids that represented different artistic fields: painting, sculpture, architecture, and music. The most elaborate sculptural feature of the facade was intended to be four sculpture groupings representing major epochs in the history of art: Ancient, Classical, Renaissance, and Modern. A lack of funds, in addition to disagreement over how "modern art" should be visually represented, resulted in that element of the facade's design being abandoned; the only vestige of these planned sculptures is four pyramids of roughly-hewn limestone that can still be seen atop the columns.

In December 2021, Agnes Hsu-Tang and her husband Oscar Tang donated $125 million towards renovations at the Metropolitan Museum of Art; the grant has since expanded to $500M USD for the new Tang Wing for Modern Art set for completion in 2030.

=== Interior ===
The building houses numerous galleries, including the Anna Wintour Costume Center and Astor Court, along with other spaces, including the Thomas J. Watson Library and the Robert Goldwater Library.

The Charles Engelhard Court of the American Wing features the facade of the Branch Bank of the United States, a Wall Street bank that was facing demolition in 1913.

=== Roof garden ===
The Iris and B. Gerald Cantor Roof Garden is located on the roof near the southwestern corner of the museum. The garden's café and bar is a popular museum spot during the mild-weathered months, especially on Friday and Saturday evenings when large crowds can lead to long lines at the elevators. The roof garden offers views of Central Park and the Manhattan skyline. The garden is the gift of philanthropists Iris and B. Gerald Cantor, founder and chairman of securities firm Cantor Fitzgerald. The garden was opened to the public on August 1, 1987.

Every summer since 1998 the roof garden has hosted a single-artist exhibition. The artists have been: Ellsworth Kelly (1998), Magdalena Abakanowicz (1999), David Smith (2000), Joel Shapiro (2001), Claes Oldenburg and Coosje van Bruggen (2002), Roy Lichtenstein (2003), Andy Goldsworthy (2004), Sol LeWitt (2005), Cai Guo-Qiang (2006), Frank Stella (2007), Jeff Koons (2008), Roxy Paine (2009), Big Bambú by Doug and Mike Starn (2010), We Come in Peace by Huma Bhabha (2018), and Parapivot by Alicja Kwade.

The roof garden has views of the Manhattan skyline from a vantage point high above Central Park. The views have been described as "the best in Manhattan." Art critics have been known to complain that the view "distracts" from the art on exhibition. New York Times art critic Ken Johnson complains that the "breathtaking, panoramic views of Central Park and the Manhattan skyline" creates "an inhospitable site for sculpture" that "discourages careful, contemplative looking." Writer Mindy Aloff describes the roof garden as "the loveliest airborne space I know of in New York." The café and bar in this garden are considered romantic by many. In 2025, the Met announced that the roof garden would close for five years starting that October.

== Landmark designations ==
The museum's main building was designated a city landmark by the New York City Landmarks Preservation Commission in 1967, and its interior was separately recognized by the Landmarks Preservation Commission in 1977. The Met's main building was designated a National Historic Landmark in 1986, recognizing both its monumental architecture, and its importance as a cultural institution.

== See also ==
- List of New York City Designated Landmarks in Manhattan from 59th to 110th Streets
- National Historic Landmarks in New York City
- National Register of Historic Places listings in Manhattan from 59th to 110th Streets
