= Sigismund Goldwater =

American physician and hospital administrator (1873–1942)

Commissioner of the New York City Department of Health
- In office January 19, 1914 – November 1, 1915
- Mayor: John Purroy Mitchel
- Preceded by: Ernst J. Lederle
- Succeeded by: Haven G. Emerson

City Commissioner of Hospitals
- In office 1934–1940

Personal details
- Born: Sigismund Schulz Goldwater; February 7, 1873 New York City, New York, US
- Died: October 22, 1942 (aged 69) Mount Sinai Hospital, Manhattan, New York, US
- Children: 3, including Robert Goldwater
- Relatives: Louise Bourgeois (daughter-in-law); Jean-Louis Bourgeois (grandson)
- Occupation: Physician; hospital administrator

Sigismund Schulz Goldwater (February 7, 1873 – October 22, 1942) was an American physician and hospital administrator, who served as the Commissioner of Health of the City of New York in 1915 and as the City Commissioner of Hospitals from 1934 to 1940.

== Biography ==
Goldwater was born on February 7, 1873 in New York City to Henry Goldwater, a druggist, and Mary Goldwater (née Tyroler). Both of Goldwater's parents were of Hungarian-Jewish origins.

Goldwater earned his medical degree in 1901. In 1903, Goldwater was appointed superintendent of Mount Sinai Hospital in Manhattan and later became director in 1917. In 1908, Goldwater became a fellow of the New York Academy of Medicine. He also was named Commissioner of Health in New York City in 1914 by Mayor John Mitchel, and during his term he was criticized for trying to enact public health measures that, during the backdrop of World War I, were considered too closely related to German philosophies.

Goldwater consulted on hospital administration and construction, and was instrumental in the founding of the Welfare Hospital for Chronic Disease on Welfare Island (present-day Roosevelt Island). The hospital was renamed the Goldwater Memorial Hospital shortly after his death.

== Personal life ==
On February 9, 1904, Goldwater married Clara Aub Goldwater (née Aub). The couple had three children including the art historian, critic, and professor Robert Goldwater. Goldwater was the father-in-law of the artist and sculptor Louise Bourgeois, and the grandfather of the writer Jean-Louis Bourgeois.

On October 22, 1942, Goldwater died in Manhattan at Mount Sinai Hospital aged 69.
