= I come in peace =

I come in peace or We come in peace may refer to:

- a phrase stereotypically used in science fiction narratives by extraterrestrial visitors upon first meeting the inhabitants of a planet
- To come with friendly intentions
- "We came in peace for all mankind" - inscription on Apollo 11 Lunar plaque
- I Come in Peace, a 1990 science fiction action film, originally produced and released internationally as Dark Angel
- "Come in Piece", a song by the Canadian rock band Doubting Thomas on their album The Infidel
- We Come in Peace with a Message of Love - 1985 Curtis Mayfield album
- We Come in Peace - art installation by Huma Bhabha
- We Come in Pieces - 2011 DVD by rock band Placebo
