= Parapivot =

Installation of two sculptures by Alicja Kwade

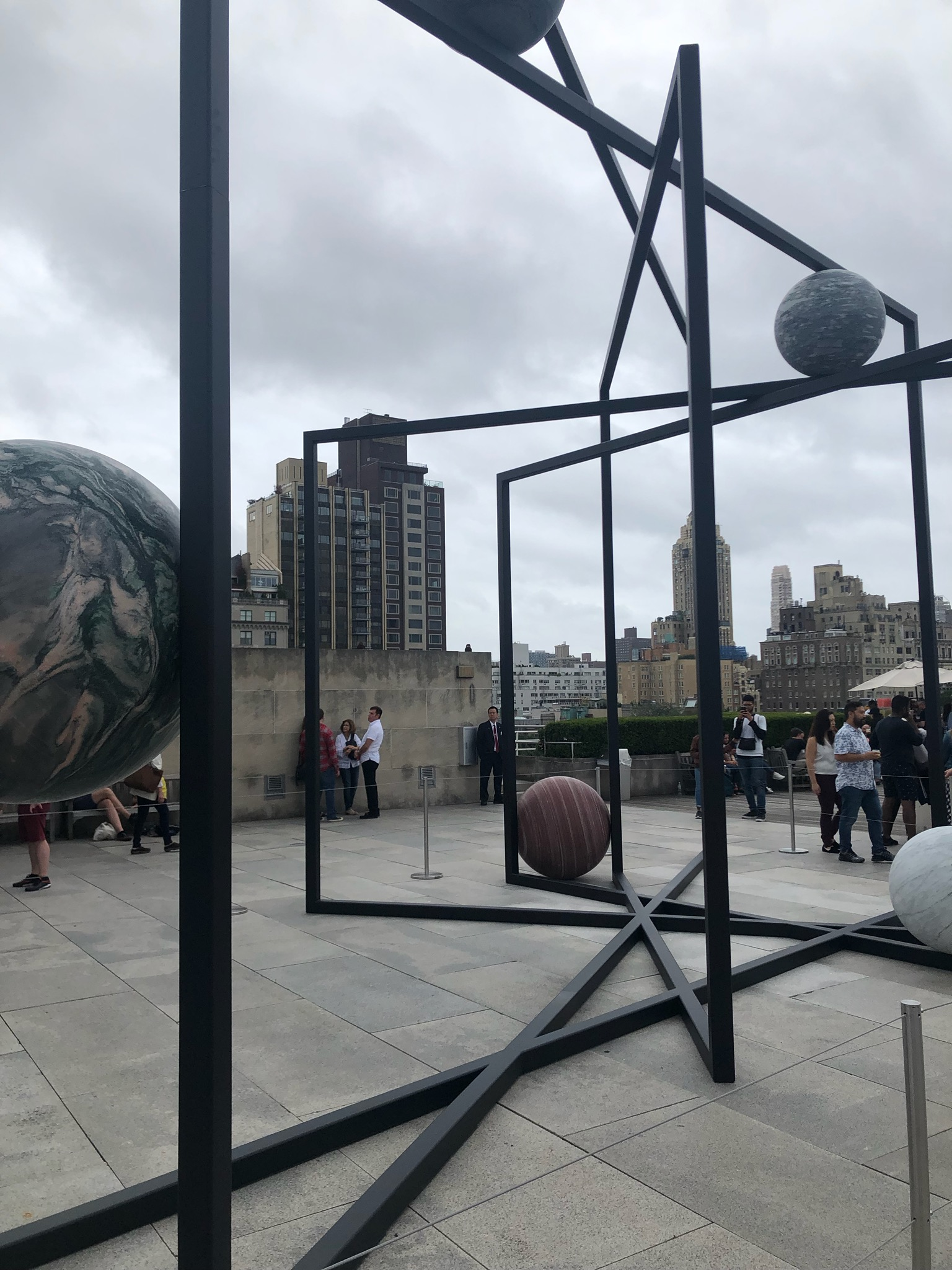
- Artist: Alicja Kwade
- Year: 2019
- Medium: Sculptures of stone and steel
- Subject: Space
- Location: Metropolitan Museum of Art, New York City
- 40.7787°N 73.9646°W
- Website: Metmuseum.org - Alicja Kwade - Parapivot

Parapivot is a commissioned installation by Alicja Kwade at the Iris and B. Gerald Cantor Roof Garden of the Metropolitan Museum of Art. The installation consists of two sculptures, Parapivot I and Parapivot II, each consisting of multiple steel frames which hold polished stone balls.

== Description ==
Across the two pieces, there are nine balls, each made of marble and granite, sourced from nine countries, including Brazil, Germany, India, Italy, Norway, and Sweden. Each of the balls, one of which weighs 1.6 short tons (1.5 t), is intended to signify one of the nine planets of the Solar System. The balls are held in place by supports in the steel frames. The installation is similar to We Come in Peace, the preceding installation by Huma Bhabha, in that they both relate to outer space.

Alicja Kwade said that the skyscrapers in the landscape behind the installation were representative of capitalism and compared the associated people to gods. She said that the art was intended to "put planets on top of [these people]". She also said that the installation was meant to evoke thinking about the nature of the Earth. According to The New York Times, Kelly Baum said that Kwade was chosen for the commission because her work engaged with science, especially astrophysics and illusionism. Initially, the Met wanted Kwade to produce an item similar to WeltenLinie for the commission.

== Critical response ==
Taylor Dafoe of Artnet News observed that Kwade's work was informed by "cosmic clarity" and "worldly wonder". Dafoe also noted that the sculptures were reminiscent of kinetic art, despite not having any moving parts. Zachary Small for Hyperallergic wrote that in the installation, Kwade captured "the universe’s unfathomable scope into a few frames" and engaged the tensions between art and science, as they relate to "objective truth". Jason Farago of The New York Times said, "Her sculpture makes use of optical tricks and careful positioning to evoke the instability, and the unknowability, of our place in the world." He also wrote that the two sculptures engage flawlessly with the landscape of New York City and synthesize "sculpture, city and universe".
