= Benaam =

Benaam may refer to:

- Benaam (1974 film), a 1974 Indian film, starring Amitabh Bachchan
- Benaam (1999 film), a 1999 Indian film
- Benaam (2006 film), a 2006 Indian film by Anees Bazmee
- Benaam (sculpture), one of two sculptures that make up We Come in Peace
- Benaam (TV series), 2021 Pakistani television drama serial

== See also ==
- Benaam Badsha, 1991 Indian film
- Benami Transactions (Prohibition) Act, 1988, Indian legislation
