= Thomas J. Watson Library =

Research library of the Metropolitan Museum of Art

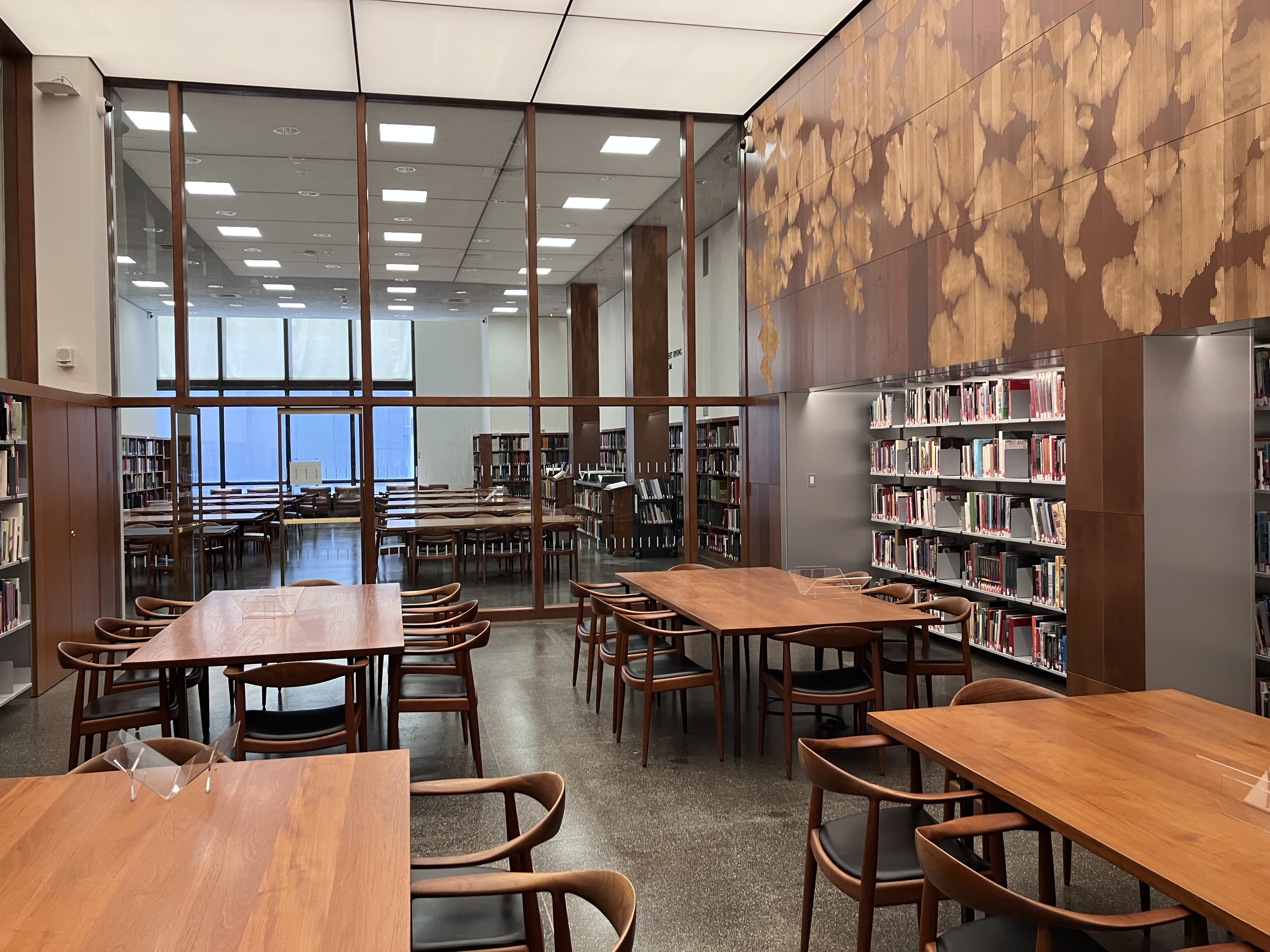
- The Thomas J. Watson Library in July 2026.
- Established: 1965
- Location: 1000 5th Ave, New York City, US
- Coordinates: 40.779165°N 73.962928°W
- Type: Non-circulating research library
- Collection size: 1,030,000
- Director: Kenneth Soehner (Chief Librarian)
- Public transit access: Subway: to 86th Street; Bus: M1, M2, M3, M4, M79, M86
- Website: Library website

The Thomas J. Watson Library is the research library of the Metropolitan Museum of Art (the Met), located in its main building, The Met Fifth Avenue, in New York City. The library is home to extensive resources and materials on the decorative arts and architecture, with substantial holdings in modern European, ancient Egyptian, Greek, Roman, Asian, and Islamic art.

The Watson Library is named after Thomas J. Watson, the former chairman and CEO of IBM from 1951 to 1956. Watson was a trustee of the Met and its vice president from 1945 to 1951, during which time he served as chairman of the museum's 75th Anniversary Campaign. Watson also endowed a book purchase fund and the chief librarian position.

== Library overview ==
Located on the first floor of the Met, the Watson Library can be visited without appointment. At the museum, most departments also maintain internal libraries, some of which have materials that can be requested online through the Watson Library catalog. The collection is a closed-shelf reference library, and materials are not available for borrowing by the general public, but may be used in a secure reading room; some items may be borrowed by Met staffers.

The Lita Annenberg Hazen and Joseph H. Hazen Center for Electronic Resources has an electronic collection of scholarly materials that include indexes, encyclopedias, dictionaries, full-text journals, and databases.

In addition, the Met previously hosted the Nolen Library on its ground floor, a collection of 10,000 items in an open-shelf, non-circulating collection intended for the general public, including children. The Nolen Library also included a large collection of children's books, as well as specialized curriculum materials for educators. In 2023, the space was replaced by the 81st Street Studio, a learning center targeted for children.

As of July 2026, the Watson Library's collection contains over 1,030,000 volumes, including monographs and exhibition catalogs; over 32,000 periodical titles; and more than 144,900 auction and sale catalogs. The library also includes a reference collection, a rare book collection, manuscript items, and vertical file collections. The library is accessible to anyone over 18, simply by registering online and providing a valid photo ID. Once a free account is set up, a researcher may issue reserve requests online, in advance of an on-site visit, and may also issue requests in person at the library.

The library houses several display cases which are used for temporary exhibits of books and publications from its collections. Exhibits may focus on a single artist, an artistic movement, a publication medium or style, or any other topic of interest. Items which are on exhibit are clearly flagged in the online catalog as temporarily unavailable for use.

== Digital collections ==
The Watson Library seeks to expand access to rare and unique research materials by digitizing collections, targeting materials that are far outside the scope of other digital libraries and online archives. In doing so, the Watson Library hopes to support scholars, researchers, and The Metropolitan Museum of Art's staff.

Highlights from the Digital Collections include but are not limited to:

- Rare Books in The Metropolitan Museum of Art Libraries
- Costume Institute
- Excavations of the Late Roman and Early Byzantine Sites in the Kharga Oasis
- Japanese Illustrated Books
- Macbeth Gallery Exhibition Catalogs
- Metropolitan Museum of Art Images
- Museum of Primitive Art Publications
- Rare Books Published in Imperial and early Soviet Russia
- David Roentgen Papers, 1773-1820
- Schools of the Metropolitan Museum of Art records, 1879-1895
- Tiffany Publications and Ephemeral Materials
