= Harriet Bell =

American advocate for disability rights

- Born: July 14, 1923; New York
- Died: September 10, 1995 (aged 72); Roosevelt Island, New York
- Occupation: Disability rights advocate
- Years active: 1953–1995

Harriet Bell (July 14, 1923 – September 10, 1995) was an American advocate for disability rights. She was a co-founder and director of the Polio Information Center and a member of the New York State Board for Nursing. Residing in the Goldwater Memorial Hospital after contracting polio, she was president of the hospital board for four terms, participating in drafting the Patients' Bill of Rights. In 1982, she was the recipient of the Wonder Woman Foundation Award of Warner Communications Inc. as an agent of change.

== Early life ==
Bell grew up in Buffalo, New York, and had one sister and a step-sister. In 1931, her sister contracted polio and in 1949, her step-sister contracted the disease as well. After working as a model, she married and had three children, Cathie (born 1950) and twins Douglas and Lori (born 1953). In 1954, she contracted polio, seven months before the availability of the polio vaccine. She was admitted to the Goldwater Memorial Hospital and confined to an iron lung. After experiencing anger and depression, and offering to allow her husband a divorce, Bell determined to take control of her life. Her husband refused to accept a divorce and though they lived separately, the couple parented their children together. As her health improved, she gained mobility with use of a wheelchair and was able to attend family functions, though her need for mechanical respiratory assistance made it necessary for her to live at the hospital facility for 25 years. During her tenure in residence, she was president of the hospital board for four terms, participating in drafting the Patients Bill of Rights.

== Career ==
Wishing to further her education, Bell tried to enroll in numerous universities in the New York City area but was rejected because of her disabilities. In 1977, she was accepted at Empire State College through an extension program that allowed distance education and she graduated in 1979. Soon after, she moved out of the hospital, taking a nearby apartment. Bell and Florence Weiner co-founded the Polio Information Center, an international data base on the disease. Bell became editor and publisher of the center's newsletter, which she operated from her residence. She was nominated for and won the Wonder Woman Foundation Award of Warner Communications Inc. in 1982 for her ability to create a new reality from her circumstance. In 1984, she completed her PhD studies at Columbia Pacific University with a dissertation, "Polio Survivors: Their Quality of Life". Despite being a quadriplegic, Bell developed skill as a painter and a typist, using assistive technology.

== Death and legacy ==
Bell died on September 10, 1995, at her home on Roosevelt Island. The information provided by the center she co-founded was an early resource for post-polio syndrome, little known at that time, and became an internationally recognized reference base.
