= Robert Goldwater =

American art historian (1907–1973)

- Born: November 23, 1907; Manhattan, New York City, US
- Died: March 26, 1973 (aged 65); Manhattan, New York City, US
- Occupations: Art historian; art critic; professor
- Spouse: Louise Bourgeois (m. 1937)
- Children: 3, including Jean-Louis Bourgeois

Academic background
- Education: Columbia University, BA, 1929; Harvard University, MA, 1931; New York University, PhD, 1937
- Thesis: Primitivism in Modern Art (1937)
- Doctoral advisor: Richard Offner

Robert John Goldwater (November 23, 1907 – March 26, 1973) was an American art historian, critic, and professor. The founder of the Museum of Primitive Art, Goldwater served as the inaugural director from 1957 until his death in 1973.

== Biography ==
Goldwater was born on November 23, 1907 in Manhattan, New York City to Sigismund Goldwater, a physician and hospital administrator, and Clara Aub Goldwater (née Aub). One of three siblings, Goldwater's paternal grandparents were Hungarian and his maternal grandparents were German.

In 1929, Goldwater received his Bachelor's from Columbia University, before later graduating with his Master's from Harvard University in 1931. Goldwater was one of the early art history students to study modern art at a time when the subject was not considered worthy of serious graduate research. Goldwater was one of the participants of the informal gatherings of art scholars organized by Meyer Schapiro (c.1935) that included Lewis Mumford, Alfred Barr and Erwin Panofsky. He wrote his doctoral dissertation in 1937 at New York University's Institute of Fine Arts under Richard Offner, on "primitivism" and Modern art. This would become the subject of his life's major works. The following year, a revised version of his dissertation appeared as the book Primitivism in Modern Painting, a pioneering work that examines the relationship between tribal arts and 20th-century painting.

In 1939, he accepted an appointment at Queens College, and taught art history there until 1956. In 1949, he co-curated a show at the Museum of Modern Art with Director Rene d'Harnoncourt entitled Modern Art in Your Life. In 1957 he returned to New York University as full professor of art history, and the same year became the first director of the Museum of Primitive Art, founded by Nelson A. Rockefeller and derived in part from Rockefeller's personal collection. Goldwater organized the first exhibition of African art by a New York museum, which opened in 1957 in a town house on West 54th Street.

In 1969, Nelson Rockefeller offered the entire Museum of Primitive Art collection to the Metropolitan Museum of Art, which established a curatorial department for the care, study and exhibition of the works. A new wing was proposed, to be named in honor of Rockefeller's son Michael who disappeared in 1961 during an expedition in New Guinea with Dutch anthropologist René Wassing. Goldwater served as Consultative Chairman of the Metropolitan Museum's Department of Primitive Art from 1971 until his death. The wing, which contains both the Metropolitan Museum's existing holdings with those of the Primitive Museum's former holdings, opened to the public in January 1982. The departmental library was renamed the Robert Goldwater Library in Goldwater's memory.

== Personal life ==
Goldwater was married to the artist and sculptor Louise Bourgeois. The couple had three sons, including the author Jean-Louis Bourgeois.

On March 26, 1973, Goldwater died in at his home on 347 West 20th Street, Manhattan.

== Books ==
- Le Primitivisme dans l'art moderne. Denise Paulme. Paris : Presses universitaires de France (1988)
- The paintings of Arshile Gorky : a critical catalogue; by Jim M Jordan; Robert John Goldwater. New York : London : New York University Press (1982)
- Symbolism. London : Penguin Books (1979)
- Robert Goldwater : a memorial exhibition, October 1973 – February 1974, The Museum of Primitive Art, New York; by Robert John Goldwater; Metropolitan Museum of Art, Dept. of Primitive Art, New York : The Metropolitan Museum of Art (1973)
- Art of Oceania, Africa, and the Americas from the Museum of primitive art. New York : The Metropolitan Museum of Art (1969)
- What is modern sculpture? New York, Museum of Modern Art; distributed by New York Graphic Society, Greenwich, Conn. (1969)
- Space and dream. M. Knoedler & Co. New York, Walker (1968; 1967)
- Primitivism in modern art. N.Y., Wittenborn (1966); Vintage books (1966)
- Senufo sculpture from West Africa. Museum of Primitive Art, New York, N.Y. Greenwich, Conn., Distributed by New York Graphic Society (1964)
- The Great Bieri. Museum of Primitive Art, New York (1962)
- Traditional art of the African nations; by Museum of Primitive Art, New York, Distributed by University Publishers (1961)
- Bambara sculpture from the Western Sudan. Museum of Primitive Art, New York, distributed by University Publishers (1960)
- Lipchitz. London : A. Zwemmer (1958)
- Modern art in everyday life. New York, Abrams (1955)
- Modern art in your life. New York, Museum of Modern Art (1953)
- Abstraction in art. New York, Abrams (1953)
- Vincent Van Gogh (1853–1890); by Meyer Schapiro; Robert John Goldwater; New York : H.N. Abrams (1953; 1952)
- Rufino Tamayo. New York, Quadrangle Press (1947)
- Artists on art, from the XIV to the XX century. 100 illustrations; by Robert John Goldwater; Marco Treves. New York, Pantheon books (1958; 1947; 1945)
- Primitivism in modern painting. New York, London, Harper & Brothers (1967; 1938)
- Paul Gauguin. New York, H.N. Abrams (1928)

== Sources ==
- Dictionary of Art Historians
