= Coler Specialty Hospital =

Hospitals in New York City

- NYC Health + Hospitals

Geography
- Location: 900 Main Street, New York, New York, United States
- Coordinates: 40°46′13″N 73°56′32″W

Organization
- Type: Specialist
- Network: NYC Health + Hospitals

Services
- Beds: 1,025
- Speciality: Chronic care, physical rehabilitation, geriatrics, HIV/AIDS, Alzheimer's care

History
- Founded: 1939 (Welfare Hospital); 1952 (Bird S. Coler Hospital)
- Closed: 2013 (Goldwater campus)

Links
- Website: nychhc.org/coler
- Lists: Hospitals in New York State
- Other links: Hospitals in Manhattan

Coler Specialty Hospital is a chronic care facility on New York City's Roosevelt Island that provides services such as rehabilitation and specialty nursing. The hospital was formed in 1996 by the merger of two separate chronic care hospitals on Roosevelt Island. Goldwater Memorial Hospital, on the south end of the island, closed in 2013, while Bird S. Coler Hospital is still located on the north end of the island.

== Bird S. Coler Specialty Hospital ==
Bird S. Coler Hospital, referred to more recently as Coler Specialty Hospital and Nursing Facility, opened in 1952 and occupies most of the north tip of the island. The number of beds increased from 500 to 815, then to 1,025 as of 2012.

In 2014, the hospital received part of the Federal government's post Hurricane Sandy funding for storm improvements.

== Goldwater Memorial Hospital ==
Goldwater Memorial Hospital opened in 1939 as the Welfare Hospital for Chronic Disease on a 9.9 acre (4.0 hectare) tract just south of the Queensboro Bridge. The hospital, which included a medical library, was named for Dr. S.S. Goldwater, the New York City Hospitals Commissioner responsible for the hospital complex master plan in 1942. It operated as a center providing long-term care for polio survivors. One of its patients, Harriet Bell, lived there from 1954 to 1979. Bell served on the hospital board as president for four terms, assisting in the drafting of the Patient's Bill of Rights.

In August 1972, the movie The Exorcist began principal photography at Goldwater, filming a scene where Jason Miller (as Father Karras) and Titos Vandis (as his uncle) argue about the care Karras's aging mother is receiving.

Goldwater, built on city-owned land, shut its doors on December 31, 2013, to provide for the new Cornell Tech campus. The hospital's closure and patient relocation was first announced in 2010, and demolition began in January 2014 with the removal of asbestos.
