= Alicja Kwade =

Polish-German artist

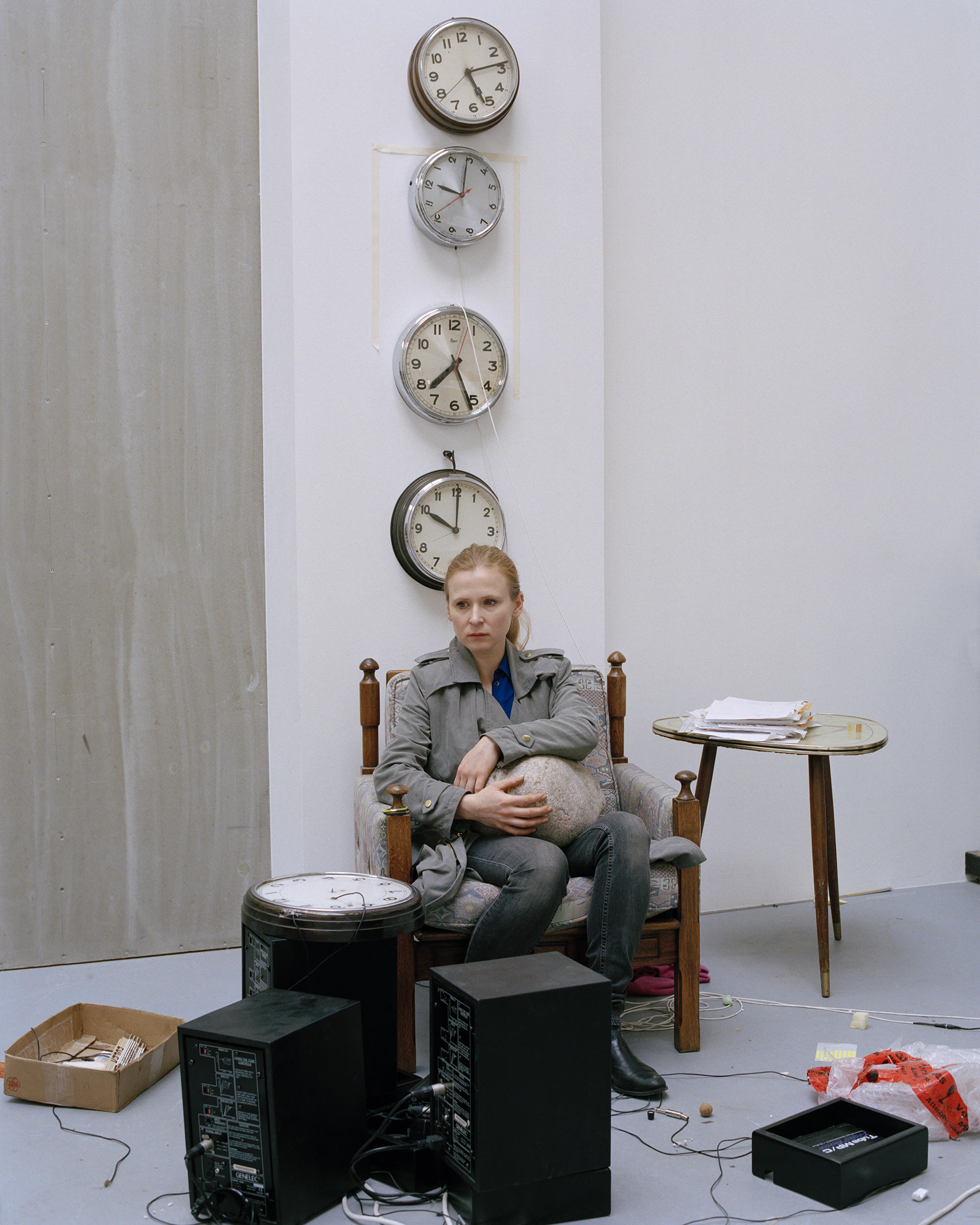
- Kwade photographed by Oliver Mark in 2014
- Born: 1979; Katowice, Poland
- Known for: sculpture
- Partner: Gregor Hildebrandt

Alicja Kwade (born 1979) is a Polish-German contemporary visual artist. Her sculptures and installations focus on the subjectivity of time and space. Kwade lives and works in Berlin.

== Early life and education ==
Kwade was born in the industrial city of Katowice, of what was then communist Poland. She was the daughter of a cultural scientist and gallery owner and conservator, and reports knowing that she wanted to be an artist at as young as five years old. Her family escaped to West Germany in 1987. She grew up in Hannover and at age 19 moved to Berlin where she studied sculpture at the Berlin University of the Arts from 1999 to 2005. In 2002, Kwade spent an Erasmus year at Chelsea College of Arts in London.

== Work ==
Kwade manipulates common materials like wood, glass, and copper through chemical processes to explore the ephemerality of the physical world. Her works often include reflection, repetitive sounds, and inaccurate doubling to create immersive and experiential spaces that beg viewers to question their perception of reality. In a 2013 interview with ArtReview magazine, Kwade explained “I’m fascinated with the borders between science and suspicion. All the in-betweens. Mr Houdini is one of my biggest heroes.”

In 2017, Kwade was photographed by Mario Testino for Vogue in Venice.

First shown at MIT List Visual Arts Center in 2020, the installation Light Touch of Totality is made up of five stainless steel rings, each about 16 feet in diameter, which appear frozen in time at various angles and points of contact. Curtains of stringed beads hang from different parts of the rings, and ungulate slightly with the movement of the air in the room. The rings are representative of both planetary rings and longitudinal lines, while the beads represent units of information. In this way, the work aligns with Kwade’s persistent interest in perception and the ways we categorize and understand our world.

=== Studios ===
Since becoming a full-time artist, Kwade has worked from studios in Berlin's Wedding, Kreuzberg (2008-2011, together with Thomas Kiesewetter) and Weißensee districts (2012-2018). She also completed an artist-in-residence program in Le Vauclin in 2012.

In 2018, Kwade moved her practice to a studio in Oberschöneweide, alongside Olafur Eliasson, Christian Jankowski and Jorinde Voigt. She had purchased her first warehouse space from Bryan Adams, and then gradually acquired and connected the two neighboring ateliers as her studio grew to 9,500 square feet.

=== Commissions ===
For her first solo public art commission in the United States in 2015, Kwade installed a 16-feet-tall aluminium 19th-century style clock titled Against the Run (2015) at the entrance to Central Park, directly opposite the storied Plaza Hotel; the clock's face moved counter-clockwise while the hour and minute hands turned in the opposite direction.

As part of a 2021 revitalization project of 550 Madison Avenue, Kwade created Solid Sky (2021), a work comprising nearly 22,000 kilograms of polished spherical quartzite suspended from the ceiling of the glassbox lobby with stainless steel chains.

== Exhibitions ==
Beginning with her first institutional show at Hamburger Bahnhof in 2008, Kwade had solo exhibitions at Kestnergesellschaft in Hannover; Kunsthalle Schirn in Frankfurt (2015); and Whitechapel Gallery, London (2016); among others. She also participated in the 2015 Venice Biennale. She also produced Parapivot for the 2019 Metropolitan Museum of Art Roof Garden Commission.

== Recognition ==
- 2002 – German Academic Scholarship Foundation
- 2010 – Robert Jacobsen Prize, Würth Foundation
- 2015 – Hector Prize, Kunsthalle Mannheim

== Art market ==
Kwade has been represented by Pace Gallery (since 2023), Galerie Kamel Mennour, 303 Gallery and i8. From 2009 to 2023, she worked with Johann König.

== Personal life ==
Since 2000, Kwade has been in a relationship with fellow artist Gregor Hildebrandt. Their son Horatio was born in 2020.
