= Femme Maison =

Series of paintings by Louise Bourgeois

Three examples from the Femme Maison series

The Femme Maison (1946–47) series of paintings by French American artist Louise Bourgeois address the question of female identity. In these paintings, the heads and bodies of nude female figures have been replaced by architectural forms such as buildings and houses. Femme Maison translates from the French as ‘housewife’: literally, ‘woman house’. In 1984 Bourgeois produced a small series of Femme Maison prints based on the works of 1947.

== Interpretations ==
Bourgeois said the Femme Maison "does not know that she is half naked, and she does not know that she is trying to hide. That is to say, she is totally self-defeating because she shows herself at the very moment that she thinks she is hiding."

Throughout Femme Maison, Bourgeois shows the home as an essentially female place, in which she can explore ideas about female identity. These paintings are frequently read by feminists as a representation of the abolition of identity for women in home and family, alluding to the "problem with no name" that Betty Friedan identified in the 60s as the dissatisfaction and the lack of fulfilment of women who embarked on careers as housewives and mothers in suburban America.

It is also important to note that Bourgeois uses her own personal history along with the issues in femininity, psychoanalysis and communication to create Femme Maison.

Another interpretation notes that for Bourgeois, architecture symbolizes the social world that attempts to define the individual, in contrast to the inner world of emotion. The tension between figure and architecture mirrors the dichotomy between mind and body.

== Use in media ==
The most familiar work from this series was used for the cover of critic Lucy Lippard's influential 1976 collection of feminist essays on art, From The Center.

The image of the female nude with the head of a home is also present in the film The Skin I Live In by director Pedro Almodóvar, who develops a relationship between the main character, Vera, and the works of Louise Bourgeois. Vera paints, amongst various images inspired by Bourgeois, this figure on the wall of her room where she lives in captivity.

== Sculptures ==
The ideas involved in the Femme Maison paintings were also translated into sculptural forms, in a range of abstraction and figuration using steel and fabric as well as marble, up through 2001. The sculpture titled Femme Maison (2001) is encased in a metal framed glass box called a "cell." In one sense, the cell encases and protects the artwork; however, Louise Bourgeois’ intention was to use the cell also as a way of containing the memory held within the work.
