= Robert Goldwater Library =

Research library in New York City

Coordinates: 40.778°N 73.963°W

The Robert Goldwater Library is a noncirculating research library in the department of the Michael C. Rockefeller Wing of The Metropolitan Museum of Art dedicated to the documentation of visual arts of sub-Saharan Africa, the Pacific Islands, and Native and Precolumbian America. The library is open to adult researchers, including college and graduate students.

== Collections ==
The Library collection comprises over 20,000 books published worldwide, with an additional 10,000 volumes of periodicals, including current subscriptions to 200 journals. Subject strengths include the art and material culture of West Africa, Papua New Guinea and Irian Jaya (Indonesia), and Precolumbian Mexico and Peru, with extensive holdings in related disciplines such as anthropology, ethnology, and archaeology. The library routinely collects exhibition and auction sales catalogs, as well as academic theses and dissertations.

WATSONLINE, the Museum's online library catalog, provides access to the Goldwater Library's holdings, with searching available by author, title, subject, keyword, or call number.

== History ==
The library of the Museum of Primitive Art, located on West 54th Street in Manhattan, opened to the public in 1957. The Museum, founded by Nelson Rockefeller, was devoted entirely to the arts of the indigenous cultures of Africa, Oceania, and the Americas and to those art objects related to the early civilizations of Asia and Europe. The museum closed in 1975. The library's holdings were transferred, with other holdings of that institution, to The Metropolitan Museum of Art in 1978. In January 1982 the library reopened to the public as the Robert Goldwater Library. Robert Goldwater (1907–1973) was the first director of the Museum of Primitive Art and a renowned scholar in both modern and African art. His Primitivism in Modern Art, initially published in 1938, was the pioneering study of the subject.

== Hours and access ==
The Goldwater Library's collections are available to researchers by request in the Watson Library. Materials will be paged from the Goldwater Library twice a day, Monday through Friday, for use in Watson during Watson Library hours. Museum visitors intending only to use the libraries do not pay Museum admission.

Located on the mezzanine level of the Michael C. Rockefeller Wing, the library is accessible by advance appointment on Tuesdays and Thursday, from 1:00 p.m. to 4:00 p.m.
