= Museum of Primitive Art =

Defunct tribal art museum

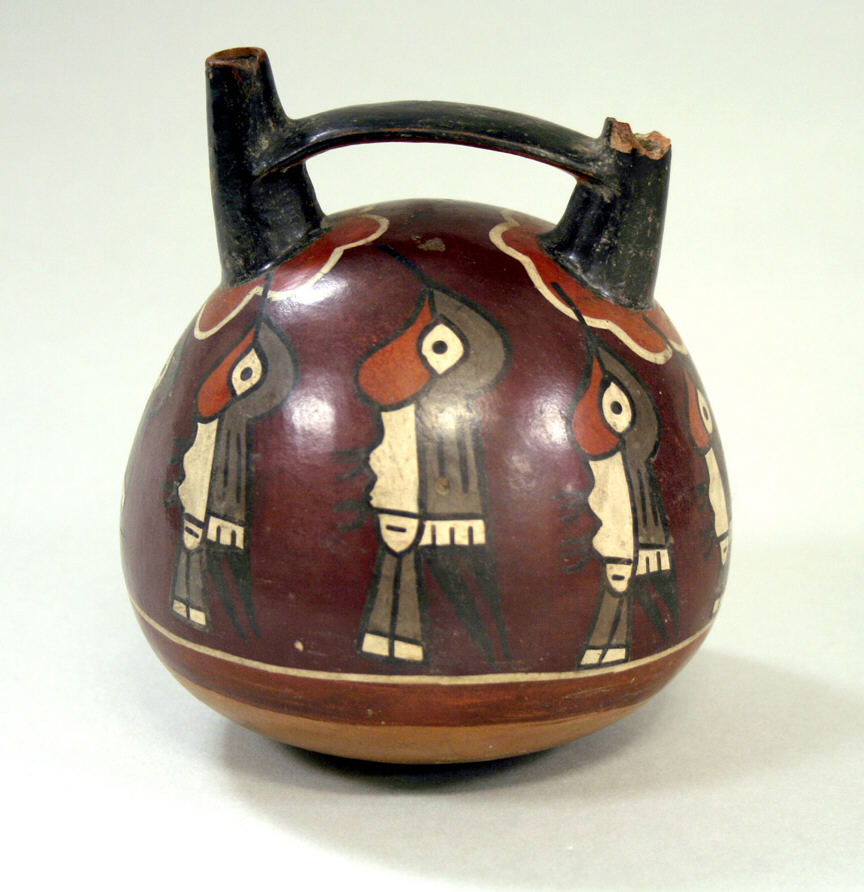
Nazca Double Spout Bottle, depicting hummingbirds feeding on flowers painted at the base of each spout. Museum of Primitive Art, New York, 1962–1978.

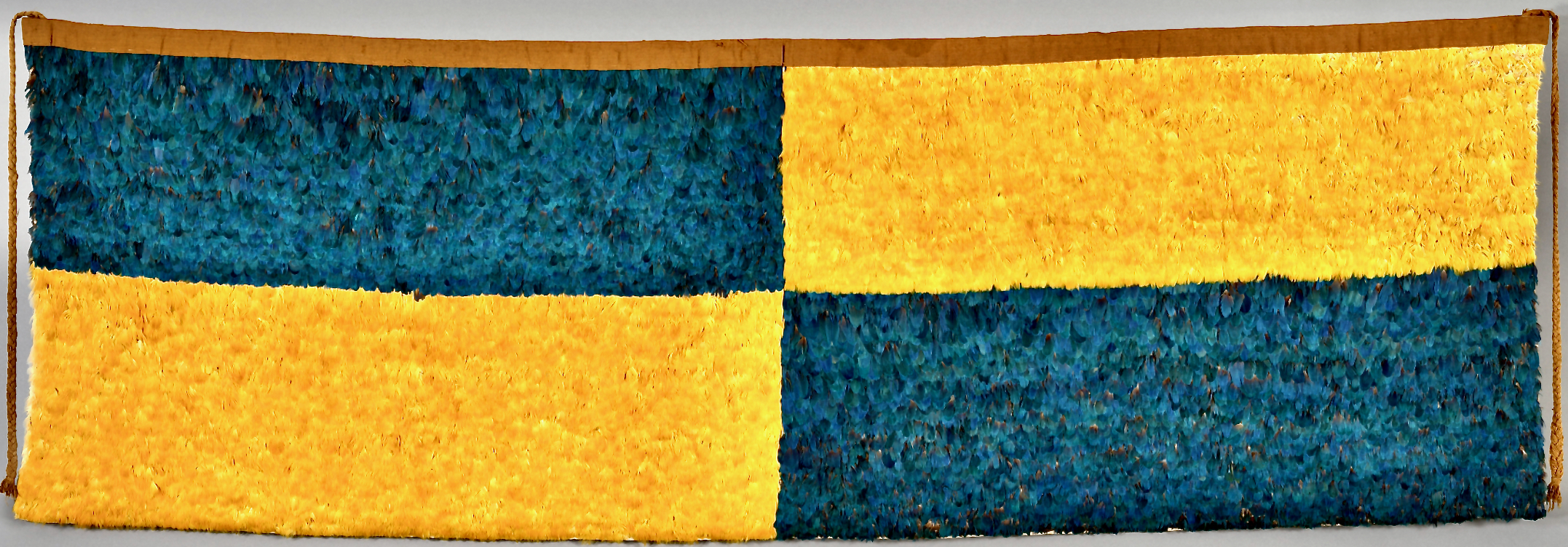
Feathered Panel A.D. 600–900 Wari, macaw feathers on cotton fabric. Nelson Rockefeller purchase, loaned to the Museum of Primitive Art, New York, 1956–1978

The Museum of Primitive Art was a museum devoted to the early arts of the indigenous cultures of Africa, the Americas, Asia, Europe and Oceania. It was founded in 1954 by Nelson Rockefeller, who donated his own collection of Tribal art. Its origins lay in Egyptologist and Metropolitan Museum of Art director Herbert Eustis Winlock's rejection of a non-Western art donation, one that Rockefeller interpreted as "this whole pre-Columbian field as a threat to his program in Egypt." Established next door to Rockefeller's childhood home in a townhouse at 15 West 54th Street, The Museum of Indigenous art was chartered in 1954. In 1957 the museum was renamed to The Museum of Primitive Art and was opened to the public. Robert Goldwater (1907–1973) was the museum’s first director. The museum closed in 1976, and its collections were transferred to the Metropolitan Museum of Art.
