= Louise Bourgeois =

French-American artist (1911–2010)

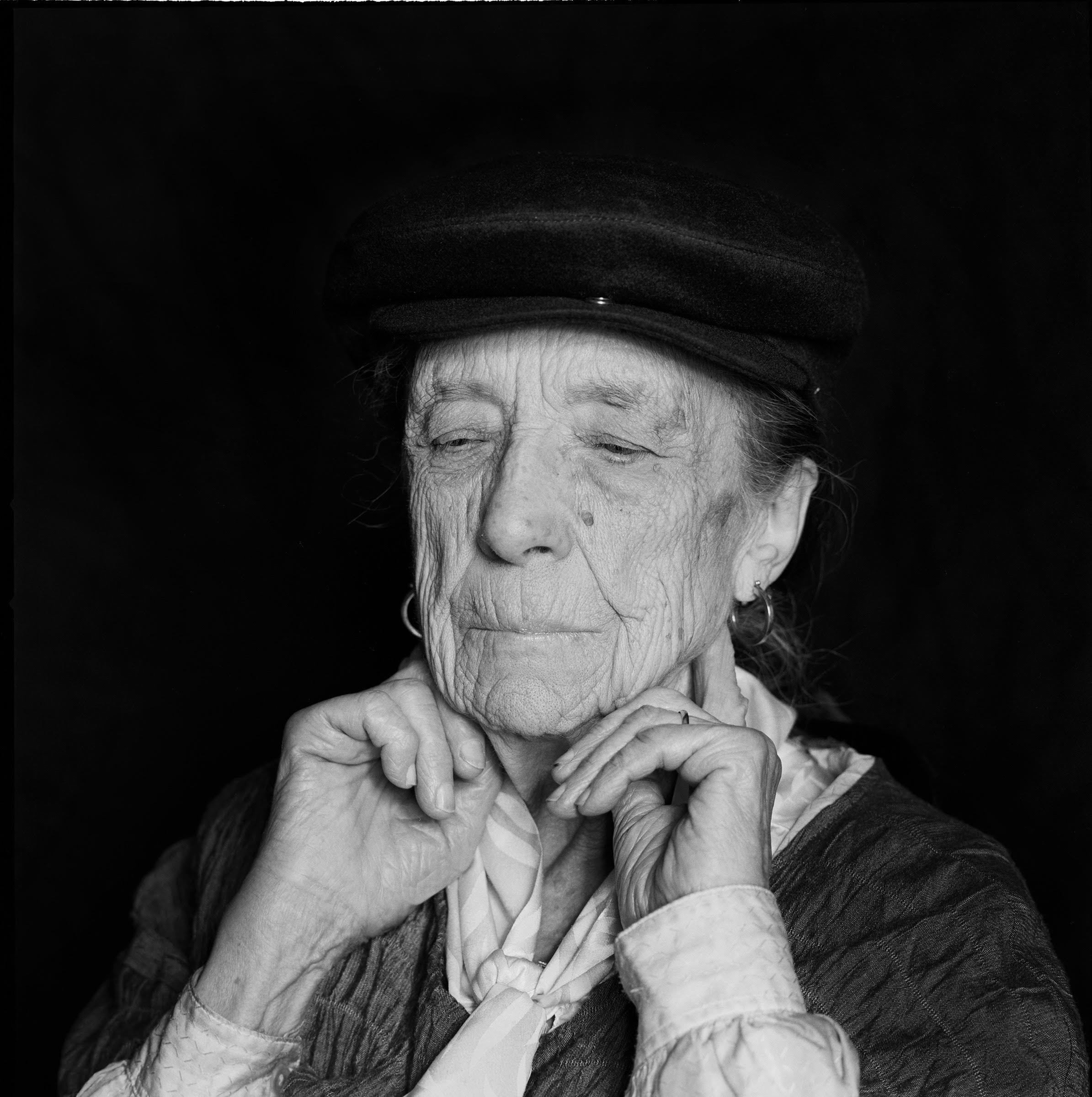
- Louise Bourgeois photographed by Oliver Mark, New York, 1996
- Born: Louise Joséphine Bourgeois; 25 December 1911; Paris, France
- Died: 31 May 2010 (aged 98); New York City, U.S.
- Education: Sorbonne; Académie de la Grande Chaumière; École du Louvre; École des Beaux-Arts
- Known for: Sculpture; installation art; painting; printmaking
- Notable work: Spider, Cells, Maman, Cumul I, The Destruction of the Father
- Movement: Modernism; surrealism; feminist art
- Spouse: Robert Goldwater (m. 1937; died 1973)
- Children: 3, including Jean-Louis Bourgeois
- Awards: Praemium Imperiale

Louise Joséphine Bourgeois (French: [lwiz buʁʒwa]; 25 December 1911 – 31 May 2010) was a French-American artist. Although she is best known for her large-scale sculpture and installation art, Bourgeois was also a prolific painter and printmaker. She explored a variety of themes over the course of her long career including domesticity and the family, sexuality and the body, as well as death and the unconscious. These themes connect to events from her childhood which she considered to be a therapeutic process. Although Bourgeois exhibited with the abstract expressionists and her work has a lot in common with Surrealism and feminist art, she was not formally affiliated with a particular artistic movement.

== Background ==
=== Early life ===
Bourgeois was born in Paris, France on 25 December 1911. She was the middle child of three born to parents Joséphine Fauriaux and Louis Bourgeois. Her parents owned a gallery that dealt primarily in antique tapestries. A few years after her birth, her family moved out of Paris and set up a workshop for tapestry restoration below their apartment in Choisy-le-Roi, for which Bourgeois filled in the designs where they had become worn.

In 1930, Bourgeois entered the Sorbonne to study mathematics and geometry, subjects that she valued for their stability, saying "I got peace of mind, only through the study of rules nobody could change."

Her mother died in 1932, while Bourgeois was studying mathematics. Her mother's death inspired her to abandon mathematics and to begin studying art. She continued to study art by joining classes where translators were needed for English-speaking students, especially because translators were not charged tuition. In one such class, Fernand Léger saw her work and told her she was a sculptor, not a painter. Bourgeois took a job as a docent, leading tours at the Musée du Louvre.

Bourgeois graduated from the Sorbonne in 1935. She began studying art in Paris, first at the École des Beaux-Arts and École du Louvre, and after 1932 in the independent academies of Montparnasse and Montmartre such as Académie Colarossi, Académie Ranson, Académie Julian, Académie de la Grande Chaumière and with André Lhote, Fernand Léger, Paul Colin and Cassandre. Bourgeois had a desire for first-hand experience and frequently visited studios in Paris, learning techniques from the artists and assisting with exhibitions. From 1934 to 1938, she is said to have apprenticed herself to some of the so-called "masters" of the time, including Fernand Léger, Paul Colin, and André Lhote. Later, however, Bourgeois became disillusioned with the conception of patriarchal genius which dominated the art world, a change motivated in part by these masters' refusal to recognize women artists.

In 1938, she opened her own gallery in a space next door to her father's tapestry gallery where she showed the work of artists such as Eugène Delacroix, Henri Matisse and Suzanne Valadon, and where she met visiting American art professor Robert Goldwater as a customer. They married and moved to the United States (where he taught at New York University). They had three sons; one was adopted. The marriage lasted until Goldwater's death in 1973.

Bourgeois settled in New York City with her husband in 1938. She continued her education at the Art Students League of New York, studying painting under Vaclav Vytlacil, and also producing sculptures and prints. "The first painting had a grid: the grid is a very peaceful thing because nothing can go wrong ... everything is complete. There is no room for anxiety ... everything has a place, everything is welcome."

Bourgeois incorporated those autobiographical references to her sculpture Quarantania I, on display in the Cullen Sculpture Garden at the Museum of Fine Arts, Houston.

=== Middle years ===
Confrérie (c.1940) at the Metropolitan Museum of Art in 2022

For Bourgeois, the early 1940s represented the difficulties of a transition to a new country and the struggle to enter the exhibition world of New York City. Her work during this time was constructed from junkyard scraps and driftwood which she used to carve upright wood sculptures. The impurities of the wood were then camouflaged with paint, after which nails were employed to invent holes and scratches in the endeavor to portray some emotion. The Sleeping Figure is one such example which depicts a war figure that is unable to face the real world due to vulnerability. Throughout her life, Bourgeois's work was created from revisiting her own troubled past as she found inspiration and temporary catharsis from her childhood years and the abuse she suffered from her father. Slowly she developed more artistic confidence, although her middle years are more opaque, which may be because she received very little attention from the art world despite her first solo show in 1945. Bourgeois' father died in 1951, and she then became an American citizen.

In 1945, Bourgeois was featured in an exhibition of fourteen women artists at Peggy Guggenheim's Art of This Century, titled The Women. While this exhibition stimulated debate about the place of women artists in the art world, it also defined them as separate from their canonized male counterparts and reinforced the damaging notion of a universally feminine experience. Commenting on her reception as a woman artist in the 1940s, Bourgeois said that she doesn't "know what art made by a woman is....There is no feminine experience in art, at least not in my case, because not just by being a woman does one have a different experience."

In 1954, Bourgeois joined the American Abstract Artists Group, with several contemporaries, among them Barnett Newman and Ad Reinhardt. At this time she also befriended the artists Willem de Kooning, Mark Rothko, and Jackson Pollock. As part of the American Abstract Artists Group, Bourgeois made the transition from wood and upright structures to marble, plaster, and bronze as she investigated concerns like fear, vulnerability, and loss of control. This transition was a turning point. She referred to her art as a series or sequence closely related to days and circumstances, describing her early work as the fear of falling which later transformed into the art of falling and the final evolution as the art of hanging in there. Her conflicts in real life empowered her to authenticate her experiences and struggles through a unique art form. In 1958, Bourgeois and her husband moved into a terraced house at West 20th Street, in Chelsea, Manhattan, where she lived and worked for the rest of her life.

Although she rejected the idea that her art was feminist, Bourgeois's subject was the feminine. Works such as Femme Maison (1946–1947), Torso self-portrait (1963–1964), and Arch of Hysteria (1993), all depict the feminine body. In the late 1960s, her imagery became more explicitly sexual as she explored the relationship between men and women and the emotional impact of her troubled childhood. Sexually explicit sculptures such as Janus Fleuri (1968) show she was not afraid to use the female form in new ways. She stated, "My work deals with problems that are pre-gender". "For example, jealousy is not male or female." Despite this assertion, in 1976 Femme Maison was featured on the cover of Lucy Lippard's book From the Center: Feminist Essays on Women's Art and became an icon of the feminist art movement. With the rise of feminism, her work found a wider audience.

=== Later life ===
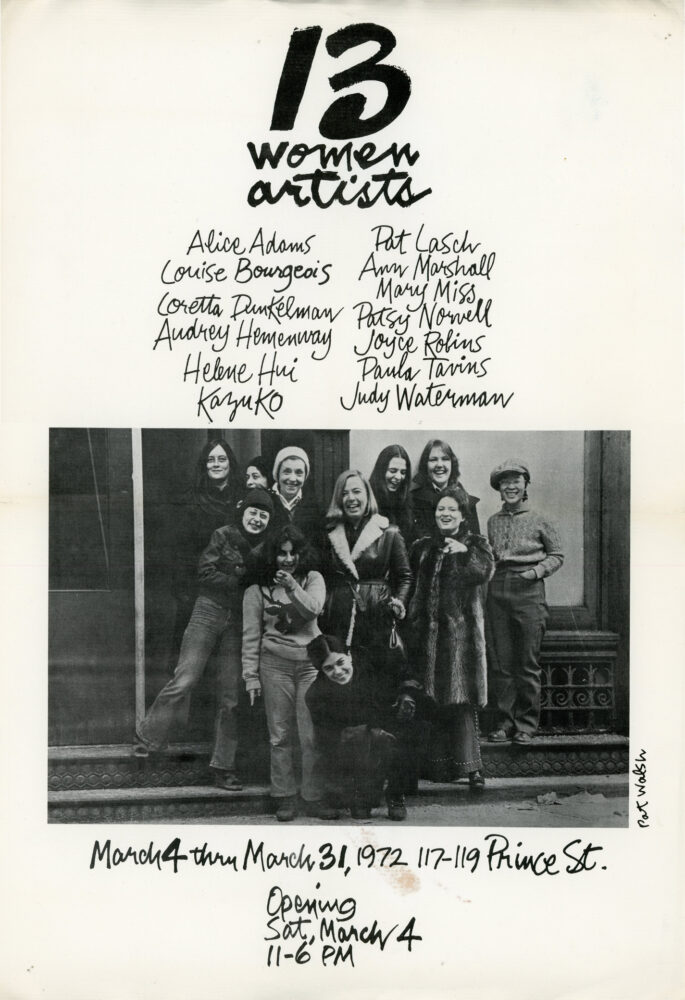
13 women 1972 exhibition poster

In the 1972 Bourgeois was part of the group exhibition of 13 Women Artists at the 117 Prince Street Gallery in New York City.

In 1973, Bourgeois started teaching at the Pratt Institute, Cooper Union, Brooklyn College and the New York Studio School of Drawing, Painting and Sculpture. From 1974 until 1977, Bourgeois worked at the School of Visual Arts in New York where she taught printmaking and sculpture. She also taught for many years in the public schools in Great Neck, Long Island.

In the early 1970s, Bourgeois held gatherings called "Sunday, bloody Sundays" at her home in Chelsea. These salons would be filled with young artists and students whose work would be critiqued by Bourgeois. Bourgeois's ruthlessness in critique and her dry sense of humor led to the naming of these meetings. Bourgeois inspired many young students to make art that was feminist in nature. However, Bourgeois' long-time friend and assistant, Jerry Gorovoy, has stated that Bourgeois considered her own work "pre-gender".

Bourgeois aligned herself with activists and became a member of the Fight Censorship Group, a feminist anti-censorship collective founded by fellow artist Anita Steckel. In the 1970s, the group defended the use of sexual imagery in artwork. Steckel argued, "If the erect penis is not wholesome enough to go into museums, it should not be considered wholesome enough to go into women."

In 1978, Bourgeois was commissioned by the General Services Administration to create Facets of the Sun, her first public sculpture. The work was installed outside of a federal building in Manchester, New Hampshire. Bourgeois received her first retrospective in 1982, by the Museum of Modern Art in New York City. Until then, she had been a peripheral figure in art whose work was more admired than acclaimed. In an interview with Artforum, timed to coincide with the opening of her retrospective, she revealed that the imagery in her sculptures was wholly autobiographical. She shared with the world that she obsessively relived through her art the trauma of discovering, as a child, that her English governess was also her father's mistress.

Between the years of 1984 and 1986, Bourgeois created a series of sculptures all under the title Nature Study which continued her lifetime commitment of challenging patriarchal standards and traditional methods of femininity in art. Nature Study addressed concerns about aggression, creativity, gender, autonomy, and childhood. In her childhood, she learned to draw through being tasked with sketching partial figures and patterns missing from damaged artworks so they could be replicated. The elements in Nature Study are forms Bourgeois repeated in drawings and bronze, but it was through sculpture that she was most clearly able to express her desire "to twist the neck". As mentioned above, Bourgeois created multiple versions of Nature Study with notable examples located at the Harvard Art Museums and the Whitney Museum of American Art in New York.

In the later stages of her career, Bourgeois continued her exploration of the use of less traditional materials, such as stuffed fabric, for her sculptures, thus challenging the accepted elevation of hard-wearing materials such as bronze or stone.

Bourgeois inside her sculpture Cell IV, in 1991

In 1989, Bourgeois made a drypoint etching, Mud Lane, of the home she maintained in Stapleton, Staten Island, which she treated as a sculptural environment rather than a living space.

In 1992, Bourgeois' work was shown at Documenta 9 in Kassel, Germany. In 1993, when the Royal Academy of Arts staged its comprehensive survey of American art in the 20th century, the organizers did not consider Bourgeois's work of significant importance to include in the survey. However, this survey was criticized for many omissions, with one critic writing that "whole sections of the best American art have been wiped out" and pointing out that very few women were included. In 2000 her works were selected to be shown at the opening of the Tate Modern in London. In 2001, she showed at the Hermitage Museum.

In 2010, the last year of her life, Bourgeois used her art to speak up for lesbian, gay, bisexual and transgender (LGBT) equality. She created the piece I Do, depicting two flowers growing from one stem, to benefit the nonprofit organization Freedom to Marry. Bourgeois has said "Everyone should have the right to marry. To make a commitment to love someone forever is a beautiful thing." Bourgeois had a history of activism on behalf of LGBT equality, having created artwork for the AIDS activist organization ACT UP in 1993.

=== Death ===
Bourgeois died of heart failure on 31 May 2010, at the Beth Israel Medical Center in Manhattan. Wendy Williams, the managing director of the Louise Bourgeois Studio, announced her death. She had continued to create artwork until her death, her last pieces being finished the week before.

The New York Times said that her work "shared a set of repeated themes, centered on the human body and its need for nurture and protection in a frightening world".

Her husband, Robert Goldwater, died in 1973. She was survived by two sons, Alain Bourgeois and Jean-Louis Bourgeois. Her first son, Michel, died in 1990.

== Work ==
=== Femme Maison ===
Femme Maison (1946–47) is a series of paintings in which Bourgeois explores the relationship of a woman and the home. In the works, women's heads have been replaced with houses, isolating their bodies from the outside world and keeping their minds domestic. This theme goes along with the dehumanization of modern art.

=== Destruction of the Father ===
Destruction of the Father (1974) is a biographical and a psychological exploration of the power dominance of father and his offspring. The piece is a flesh-toned installation in a soft and womb-like room. Made of plaster, latex, wood, fabric, and red light, Destruction of the Father was the first piece in which she used soft materials on a large scale. Upon entering the installation, the viewer stands in the aftermath of a crime. Set in a stylized dining room (with the dual impact of a bedroom), the abstract blob-like children of an overbearing father have rebelled, murdered, and eaten him.

... telling the captive audience how great he is, all the wonderful things he did, all the bad people he put down today. But this goes on day after day. There is tragedy in the air. Once too often he has said his piece. He is unbearably dominating although probably he does not realize it himself. A kind of resentment grows and one day my brother and I decided, 'the time has come!' We grabbed him, laid him on the table and with our knives dissected him. We took him apart and dismembered him, we cut off his penis. And he became food. We ate him up ... he was liquidated the same way he liquidated the children.

=== Exorcism in art ===
In 1982, the Museum of Modern Art in New York City featured the unknown artist Louise Bourgeois' work. She was 70 years old and a mixed media artist who worked on paper and with metal, marble and animal skeletal bones. Childhood family traumas "bred an exorcism in art", and she desperately attempted to purge her unrest through her work. She felt she could get in touch with issues of female identity, the body, and the fractured family long before the art world and society considered them as subjects to be expressed in art. This was Bourgeois' way to find her center and stabilize her emotional unrest. The New York Times said at the time that "her work is charged with tenderness and violence, acceptance and defiance, ambivalence and conviction".

=== Cells ===
While in her eighties, Bourgeois produced two series of enclosed installation works she referred to as Cells. Many are small enclosures into which the viewer is prompted to peer inward at arrangements of symbolic objects; others are small rooms into which the viewer is invited to enter. In the cell pieces, Bourgeois uses earlier sculptural forms, found objects as well as personal items that carried strong personal emotional charge for the artist.

The cells enclose psychological and intellectual states, primarily feelings of fear and pain. Bourgeois stated that the Cells represent "different types of pain; physical, emotional and psychological, mental and intellectual ... Each Cell deals with a fear. Fear is pain ... Each Cell deals with the pleasure of the voyeur, the thrill of looking and being looked at."

=== Maman ===
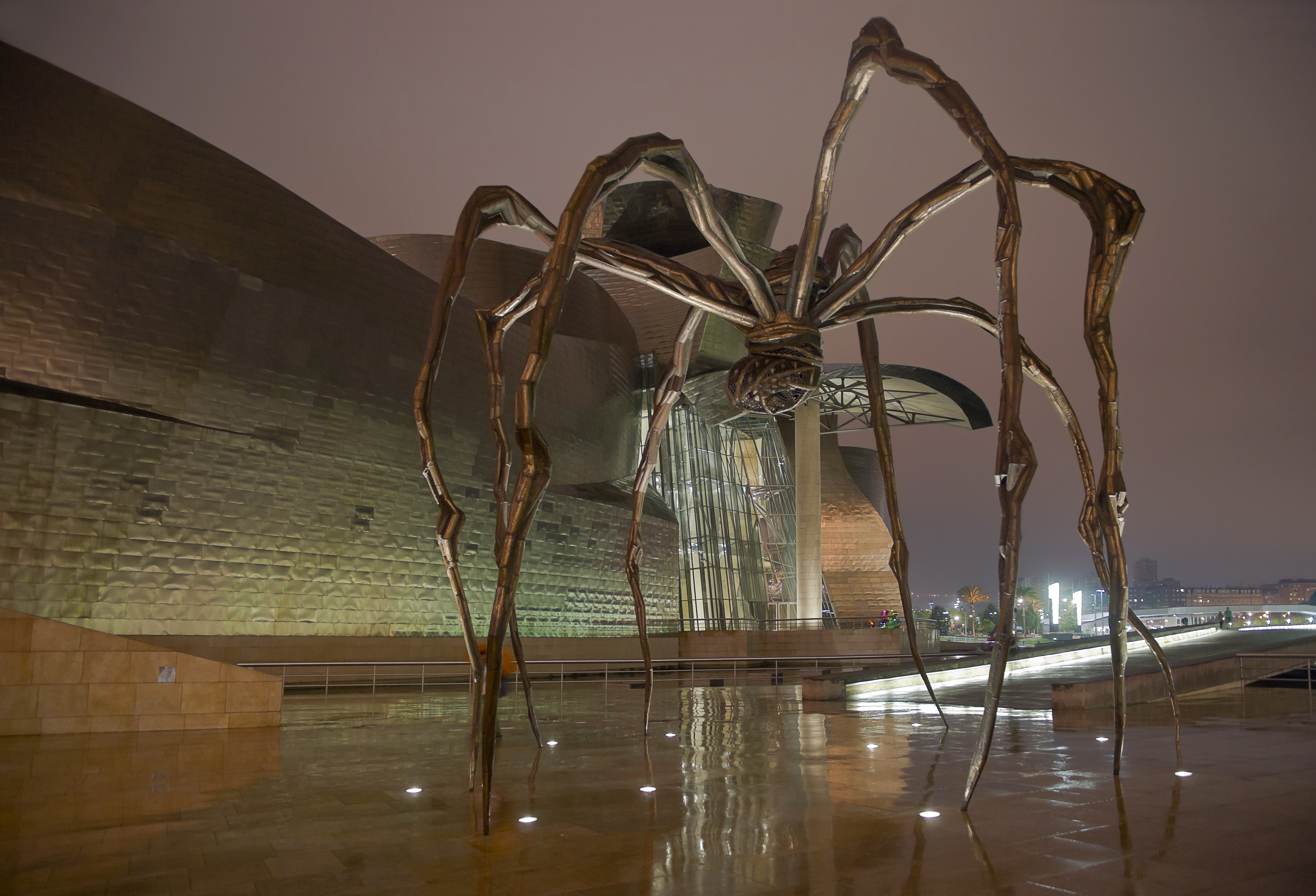
Bourgeois's Maman sculpture at the Guggenheim Museum Bilbao

In the late 1990s, Bourgeois began using the spider as a central image in her art. Maman, which stands more than nine metres high, is a steel and marble sculpture from which an edition of six bronzes were subsequently cast. It first made an appearance as part of Bourgeois's commission for The Unilever Series for Tate Modern's Turbine Hall in 2000. The bronze casts of Maman reside in the permanent collections of many notable institutions including the Qatar National Convention Centre in Doha, Qatar and the National Gallery of Canada in Ottawa, ON. Maman is the largest Spider sculpture ever made by Bourgeois. Moreover, Maman alludes to the strength of her mother, with metaphors of spinning, weaving, nurture and protection. The prevalence of the spider motif in her work has given rise to her nickname as Spiderwoman.

The Spider is an ode to my mother. She was my best friend. Like a spider, my mother was a weaver. My family was in the business of tapestry restoration, and my mother was in charge of the workshop. Like spiders, my mother was very clever. Spiders are friendly presences that eat mosquitoes. We know that mosquitoes spread diseases and are therefore unwanted. So, spiders are helpful and protective, just like my mother.

— Louise Bourgeois

=== Maisons fragiles / Empty Houses ===
Bourgeois's Maisons fragiles / Empty Houses sculptures are parallel, high metallic structures supporting a simple tray. One must see them in person to feel their impact. They are not threatening or protecting, but bring out the depths of anxiety within you. Bachelard's findings from psychologists' tests show that an anxious child will draw a tall narrow house with no base. Bourgeois had a rocky/traumatic childhood and this could support the reason behind why these pieces were constructed.

=== Printmaking ===
Bourgeois's printmaking flourished during the early and late phases of her career: in the 1930s and 1940s, when she first came to New York from Paris, and then again starting in the 1980s, when her work began to receive wide recognition. Early on, she made prints at home on a small press, or at the renowned workshop Atelier 17. That period was followed by a long hiatus, as Bourgeois turned her attention fully to sculpture. It was not until she was in her seventies that she began to make prints again, encouraged first by print publishers. She set up her old press, and added a second, while also working closely with printers who came to her house to collaborate. A very active phase of printmaking followed, lasting until the artist's death. Over the course of her life, Bourgeois created approximately 1,500 printed compositions.

In 1990, Bourgeois decided to donate the complete archive of her printed work to the Museum of Modern Art. In 2013, the museum launched the online catalogue raisonné. The site focuses on the artist's creative process and places Bourgeois's prints and illustrated books within the context of her overall production by including related works in other mediums that deal with the same themes and imagery.

=== Themes and critique ===
One theme of Bourgeois's work is that of childhood trauma and hidden emotion. After Bourgeois's mother became sick with influenza, her father began having affairs with other women, most notably a decade-long affair with Sadie Gordon Richmond, Bourgeois's English tutor, who was only six years older than her. He would bring mistresses home and be openly unfaithful in front of the family. This was the beginning of the artist's engagement with double standards related to gender and sexuality, which was expressed in much of her work. She recalls her father saying "I love you" repeatedly to her mother, despite infidelity. "He was the wolf, and she was the rational hare, forgiving and accepting him as he was."

Motherhood is another recurrent theme of Bourgeois's work. It was her mother who encouraged Bourgeois to draw and who involved her in the tapestry business. Bourgeois considered her mother to be intellectual and methodical; the continued motif of the spider in her work often represents her mother. The notion of a spider that spins and weaves its web is a direct reference to her parents' tapestry business and can also be seen as a metaphor for her mother, who repairs things.

Bourgeois has explored the concept of femininity through challenging the patriarchal standards and making artwork about motherhood rather than showing women as muses or ideals. She has been described as the 'reluctant hero of feminist art'. Bourgeois had a feminist approach to her work similar to fellow artists such as Agnes Martin and Eva Hesse, less driven by the political but rather made work that drew on their experiences of gender and sexuality, naturally engaging with women's issues.

Architecture and memory are important components of Bourgeois's work. Bourgeois's work are very organic, biological, reproductive feel to them; they draw attention to the work itself. Bourgeois describes architecture as a visual expression of memory, or memory as a type of architecture. The memory which is featured in much of her work is an invented memory – about the death or exorcism of her father. The imagined memory is interwoven with her real memories including living across from a slaughterhouse and her father's affair. To Louise her father represented injury and war, aggrandizement of himself and belittlement of others and most importantly a man who represented betrayal.

Bourgeois's work is powered by confessions, self-portraits, memories, fantasies of a restless being who is seeking through her sculpture a peace and an order which were missing throughout her childhood.

The art critic Christopher Allen described Bourgeois in The Australian newspaper in 2024 as "chronically overrated" and as "a mediocre artist raised by the institutional demand for a 'modern master' to a level at which her weakness and inadequacy are inescapably apparent."

=== Collaboration ===
==== Do Not Abandon Me ====
This collaboration took place over a span of two years with British artist Tracey Emin. The work was exhibited in London months after Bourgeois's death in 2010. The subject matter consists of male and female images. Although they appear sexual, it portrays a tiny female figure paying homage to a giant male figure, like a God. Bourgeois did the water colors and Tracey Emin did the drawing on top. It took Emin two years to decide how to figure out what she would contribute in the collaboration. When she knew what to do, she finished all of the drawings in a day and believes every single one worked out perfectly. I Lost You is about losing children, losing life. Bourgeois had to bury her son as a parent. Abandonment for her is not only about losing her mother but her son as well. Despite the age gap between the two artists and differences in their work, the collaboration worked out gently and easily.

== Notable exhibitions and site-specific projects (selection) ==
Bourgeois' work continues to be exhibited in museums and public spaces through the shape of site-specific installations around the world. For example, the Massachusetts Museum of Contemporary Art (MASS MoCA), North Adams, has presented a collection of the artist's pieces in marble and other materials for nearly a decade.

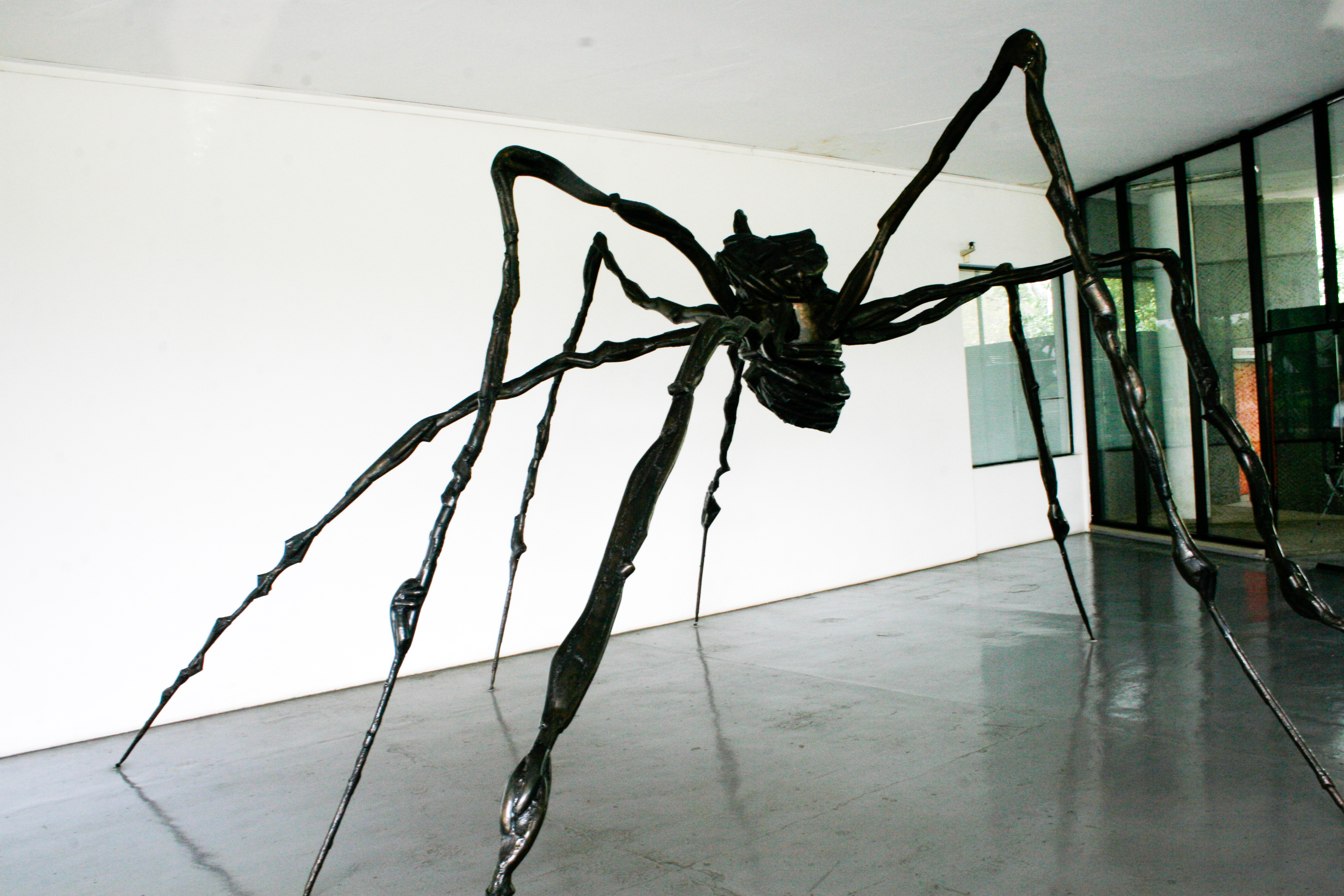
Aranha, Louise Joséphine Bourgeois (5878031270)

The large-scale sculpture Maman, acquired by the Itaú Cultural Institute in 1996 and lent to the São Paulo Museum of Modern Art, Brazil, was sent on a multi-city tour to institutions and public areas such as the Inhotim Institute in Minas Gerais, the Iberê Camargo Foundation in Porto Alegre, and then to the Oscar Niemeyer Museum in Curitiba.

In 2020, Bourgeois work was featured in a major group show at the Pérez Art Museum Miami, Florida. My Body, My Rules, presented an investigating about the diverse artistic practices of 23 female-identified artists in the 21st-century. Carolee Schneemann, Cindy Sherman, Lorna Simpson, Ana Mendieta, Wanguechi Mutu, Mickalene Thomas, and Francesca Woodman, were among them.

== Selected works ==
=== Bibliography ===
- 1982 – Louise Bourgeois. Museum of Modern Art. 1982. p. 123. ISBN 978-0-87070-257-0.
- 1994 – The Prints of Louise Bourgeois. Museum of Modern Art. 1994. p. 254. ISBN 978-0-8109-6141-8.
- 1994 – Louise Bourgeois: The Locus of Memory Works 1982-1993. Harry N. Abrams. 1994. p. 144. ISBN 978-0-8109-3127-5.
- 1996 – Louise Bourgeois: Drawings and Observations. Bulfinch. 1995. p. 192. ISBN 978-0-8212-2299-7.
- 1998 – Louise Bourgeois Destruction of the Father / Reconstruction of the Father. MIT Press in association with Violette Editions. 1998. p. 384. ISBN 978-0-262-52246-5.
- 2000 – Louise Bourgeois: Memory and Architecture. Actar. 1999. p. 316. ISBN 978-84-8003-188-2.
- 2001 – Louise Bourgeois: The Insomnia Drawings. Scalo Publishers. 2000. p. 580. ISBN 978-3-908247-39-5.
- 2001 – Louise Bourgeois's Spider: The Architecture of Art-Writing. University of Chicago Press. 29 June 2001. p. 88. ISBN 978-0-226-03575-8.
- 2008 – Louise Bourgeois: The Secret of the Cells. Prestel USA. 2008. p. 168. ISBN 978-3-7913-4007-4.
- 2011 – To Whom it May Concern. Violette Editions. 2011. p. 76. ISBN 978-1-900828-36-9.
- 2011 – Armed forces. Ediciones Poligrafa. 2011. p. 48. ISBN 978-8-434312-53-1.
- 2012 – The Return of the Repressed. Violette Editions. 2012. p. 500. ISBN 978-1-900828-37-6.
- 2015 – Mumbling Beauty Louise Bourgeois. Thames & Hudson. 2015. p. 112. ISBN 978-0-500093-91-7.

=== Documentary ===
- 1987 – Bourgeois, Louise. Louise Bourgeois: ART/new york No. 27. Inner-Tube Video.
- 2008 – Bourgeois, Louise. Louise Bourgeois: The Spider, the Mistress, and the Tangerine. Zeitgeist Films.

=== Exhibitions ===
- 1947 – Persistent Antagonism at San Francisco Museum of Modern Art, San Francisco.
- 1949 – Untitled at Art Institute of Chicago, Chicago.
- 1967 – Untitled at National Academy of Design, New York City.
- 1972 – Number Seventy-Two at Storm King Art Center, Mountainville, New York.
- 1982 – Louise Bourgeois, at the Museum of Modern Art, New York City.
- 1982 – Eyes, marble sculpture, at Metropolitan Museum of Art, New York City.
- 1984 – Nature Study: Eyes at Albright-Knox Art Gallery, Buffalo, New York.
- 1987 – Louise Bourgeois: Sculpture 1947–1955 at Gallery Paule Anglim, San Francisco, California.
- 1992 – Sainte Sebastienne at Dallas Museum of Art, Dallas.
- 1993 – Louise Bourgeois: Recent Work at U.S. Pavilion, 45th Venice Biennale, Venice, Italy.
- 1993 – Helping Hands in permanent display at Chicago Women's Park & Gardens as of 2011, Chicago.
- 1994 – The Prints of Louise Bourgeois at the Museum of Modern Art, New York City.
- 1994 – The Nest at San Francisco Museum of Modern Art, San Francisco.
- 1994 – Louise Bourgeois: The Locus of Memory, Works 1982–1993 at the Brooklyn Museum, Brooklyn, and the Corcoran Gallery of Art, Washington, D.C.
- 1995 – Louise Bourgeois: The Locus of Memory, Works 1982–1993 at Galerie Rudolfinum, Prague.
- 1997 – Maman at Kemper Museum of Contemporary Art, Kansas City.
- 1999 – Maman at Guggenheim Museum Bilbao.
- 1999 – Granite eyeball benches and 25' bronze water fountain, at Agnes R. Katz Plaza, Pittsburgh. Sculptures are currently on permanent display.
- 2000 – Fallen Woman at Galleria d'arte moderna Palazzo Forti, Verona.
- 2006 – Louise Bourgeois: Femme at the Walters Art Museum (with the Contemporary Museum), 11 February – 21 May 2006
- 2007 – Maman at Tate Modern, London.
- 2008 – Louise Bourgeois at Centre Pompidou, Paris, 5 March 2008 – 2 June 2008.
- 2008 – Louise Bourgeois Full Career Retrospective at Solomon R. Guggenheim Museum, New York City.
- 2008 – Nature Study at Inverleith House, Edinburgh.
- 2008 – Louise Bourgeois for Capodimonte at National Museum of Capodimonte, Naples.
- 2009 – Louise Bourgeois: Moi, Eugénie Grandet, un processus d'identification at Maison de Balzac, Paris.
- 2009 – Louise Bourgeois, Hirshhorn Museum and Sculpture Garden, Washington, D. C. 26 February–17 May 2009
- 2010 – Louise Bourgeois: The Fabric Works, at Fondazione Vedova Venice. Travelling to Hauser & Wirth, London.
- 2010 – Louise Bourgeois: Mother and Child at Gallery Paule Anglim, San Francisco, California.
- 2011 – Louise Bourgeois: À L'Infini at Fondation Beyeler, Riehen, Basel, 3 September 2011 – 8 January 2012.
- 2011 – Louise Bourgeois. The Return of the Repressed, at Fundación Proa, Buenos Aires. Travelling to Instituto Tomie Ohtake, São Paulo, and Museu de Arte Moderna, Rio de Janeiro.
- 2011 – Louise Bourgeois (1911–2010) at the National Gallery of Canada, Ottawa, Ontario, Canada, 21 April 2011 – 18 March 2012.
- 2012 – Louise Bourgeois: Conscious and Unconscious at the Qatar Museums Gallery, Katara, Doha, Qatar, 20 January 2012 – 1 June 2012.
- 2012 – Louise Bourgeois: The Return of The Repressed at Freud Museum, London, 7 March 2012 – 27 May 2012.
- 2012 – Louise Bourgeois: Late Works at Heide Museum of Modern Art, Melbourne, 24 November 2012 – 11 March 2013.
- 2013 – Louise Bourgeois 1911–2010 at Museum of Contemporary Canadian Art, 22 June 2013 – 11 August 2013.
- 2014 – Louise Bourgeois: A Woman Without Secrets at Middlesbrough Institute of Modern Art, 18 July 2014 – 12 October 2014.
- 2015 – ARTIST ROOMS: Louise Bourgeois: A Woman Without Secrets at Southampton City Art Gallery, 16 January 2015 – 18 April 2015.
- 2015 – Louise Bourgeois. Structures of Existence: the Cells at Haus der Kunst, Munich, Germany, 27 February 2015 – 2 August 2015.
- 2015 – Louise Bourgeois: I Have Been to Hell and Back at Moderna Museet, Stockholm, Sweden, 14 February 2015 – 17 May 2015.
- 2015-2016 – Louise Bourgeois: No Exit at the National Gallery of Art, Washington, D.C., 15 November 2015 – 15 May 2016
- 2016 – Louise Bourgeois: Structures of Existence: The Cells at Guggenheim Museum Bilbao, Spain, Exhibition date: 18 March 2016 – 4 September 2016.
- 2016 – Louise Bourgeois: Turning Inwards at Hauser & Wirth, Switzerland, 2 October 2016 – 1 January 2017
- 2017 – Louise Bourgeois: Human Nature: Doing, Undoing, Redoing at Kistefos Museum and Sculpture Park, Jevnaker, Norway, 21 May 2017 – 9 October 2017.
- 2017 – Louise Bourgeois: Spiders at the San Francisco Museum of Modern Art, 7 October 2017 – 4 September 2018.
- 2017 – Louise Bourgeois: Twosome at Tel Aviv Museum of Art, Tel Aviv, Israel, 7 September 2017 – 17 February 2018.
- 2017 – Louise Bourgeois: An Unfolding Portrait at the Museum of Modern Art, New York City, 24 September 2017 – 28 January 2018.
- 2018 – Louise Bourgeois: The Empty House at Schinkel Pavillon (Berlin-Mitte), 21 April 2018 – 29 July 2018.
- 2018 – Louise Bourgeois, ICA Miami, 13 July 2018 – 6 January 2019
- 2018 – Louise Bourgeois: To Unravel a Torment at Glenstone Museum, Potomac, Maryland, 10 May 2017 – 1 January 2020.
- 2019 – Louise Bourgeois & Alex van Gelder at UM Museum, Seoul, South Korea, 1 October 2019 – 31 December 2019.
- 2019 – 1999-12-03 Abels, Carolyn, "Katz Plaza in Cultural District is Dedicated", Pittsburgh Post-Gazette (vol. 73, no. 125, p. B-1)
- 2021 – Louise Bourgeois, Freud's Daughter at Jewish Museum (Manhattan), 21 May 2021 – 12 September 2021.
- 2022 – Louise Bourgeois: Paintings at the Metropolitan Museum of Art, 12 April – 7 August 2022
- 2022 – Louise Bourgeois: The Woven Child, Gropius Bau, Berlin, 22 July – 23 October 2022
- 2023 – Louise Bourgeois: Has the Day Invaded the Night or Has the Night Invaded the Day?, Art Gallery of New South Wales, Australia, 25 November 2023 – 28 April 2024
- 2024 – Louise Bourgeois In Florence, Museo Novecento, Florence, 22 June – 20 October 2024
- 2024 – Louise Bourgeois: I have been to hell and back. And let me tell you, it was wonderful. Mori Art Museum, Tokyo.
- 2025 – Louise Bourgeois: Drawings from the 1960s, The Courtauld Gallery, London, 20 June – 14 September 2025
- 2025 – Abstract Erotic: Louise Bourgeois, Eva Hesse, Alice Adams, The Courtauld Gallery, London, 20 June – 14 September 2025
- 2025-2026 – Louise Bourgeois: In Private View, Auckland Art Gallery, Auckland, New Zealand, 27 September 2025 – 17 May 2026

== Recognition ==
- 1972: Mary Beth Edelson's Some Living American Women Artists / Last Supper (1972) appropriated Leonardo da Vinci's The Last Supper, with the heads of notable women artists collaged over the heads of Christ and his apostles. Bourgeois was among those notable women artists. This image, addressing the role of religious and art historical iconography in the subordination of women, became "one of the most iconic images of the feminist art movement".
- 1977: Honorary doctorate from Yale University
- 1981: Fellow of the American Academy of Arts and Sciences
- 1990: Elected into National Academy of Design
- 1990: Edward MacDowell Medal, MacDowell Colony, Peterborough, New Hampshire
- 1991: Lifetime Achievement in Contemporary Sculpture Award (Hamilton, New Jersey, USA)
- 1997: National Medal of Arts
- 1999: Praemium Imperiale for lifetime achievement
- 1999: Golden Lion at the Venice Biennale
- 2003: Wolf Foundation Prize in the Arts (Jerusalem)
- 2005: Austrian Decoration for Science and Art
- 2008: National Order of the Legion of Honour
- 2009: Commanderesse exquise, Arrangeuse du monde Collège de Pataphysique, New York, Ordre de la Grande Gidouille
- 2009: Honored by the National Women's Hall of Fame

== Collections ==
Major holdings of her work include:

- US: the National Gallery of Art in Washington, D.C.; the Museum of Modern Art in New York City and Nasher Sculpture Center; the San Francisco Museum of Modern Art
- Canada: National Gallery of Canada
- UK: Tate Modern in London
- France: Centre Pompidou in Paris

Throughout her career, Bourgeois knew many of her core collectors, such as Ginny Williams, Agnes Gund, Ydessa Hendeles and Ursula Hauser. Other private collections with notable Bourgeois pieces include the Goetz Collection in Munich.

== Art market ==
Bourgeois started working with gallerist Paule Anglim in San Francisco in 1987, Karsten Greve in Paris in 1990, Xavier Hufkens in Brussels in 1996 and Hauser & Wirth in 1997. Hauser & Wirth has been the principal gallery for her estate. Others, such as Kukje Gallery in Seoul continue to deal in her work.

In 2011 one of Bourgeois's works, titled Spider, sold for $10.7 million, a new record price for the artist at auction, and the highest price paid for a work by a woman at the time. In late 2015, the piece sold at another Christie's auction for $28.2 million.
