= Jean-Louis Bourgeois =

American author (1940–2022)

Jean-Louis Bourgeois (July 4, 1940 – December 8, 2022) was an American author and the son of artist Louise Bourgeois and art historian Robert Goldwater. Bourgeois studied literature and architectural history at Harvard University.

== Biography ==
In 1969 and 1970 Bourgeois worked at Artforum before becoming interested in the production and history of mud brick architecture. He was the author of the volume Spectacular Vernacular: the Adobe Tradition (with photographs taken by Carollee Pelos) which established him as an expert on the subject. He owned a home in Djenne, Mali and was actively involved in architectural conservation efforts there including the preservation of the world's largest adobe building the Great Mosque of Djenne, and wrote on the subject. While living in Djennê, Bourgeois opposed the Talo Dam project, and became a fixture in the city's cultural life. He appeared in the 2008 documentary film on his mother Louise Bourgeois: The Spider, the Mistress, and the Tangerine. Bourgeois owned an adobe house in Taos, New Mexico, and also wrote on the Southwestern Native American Adobe tradition.

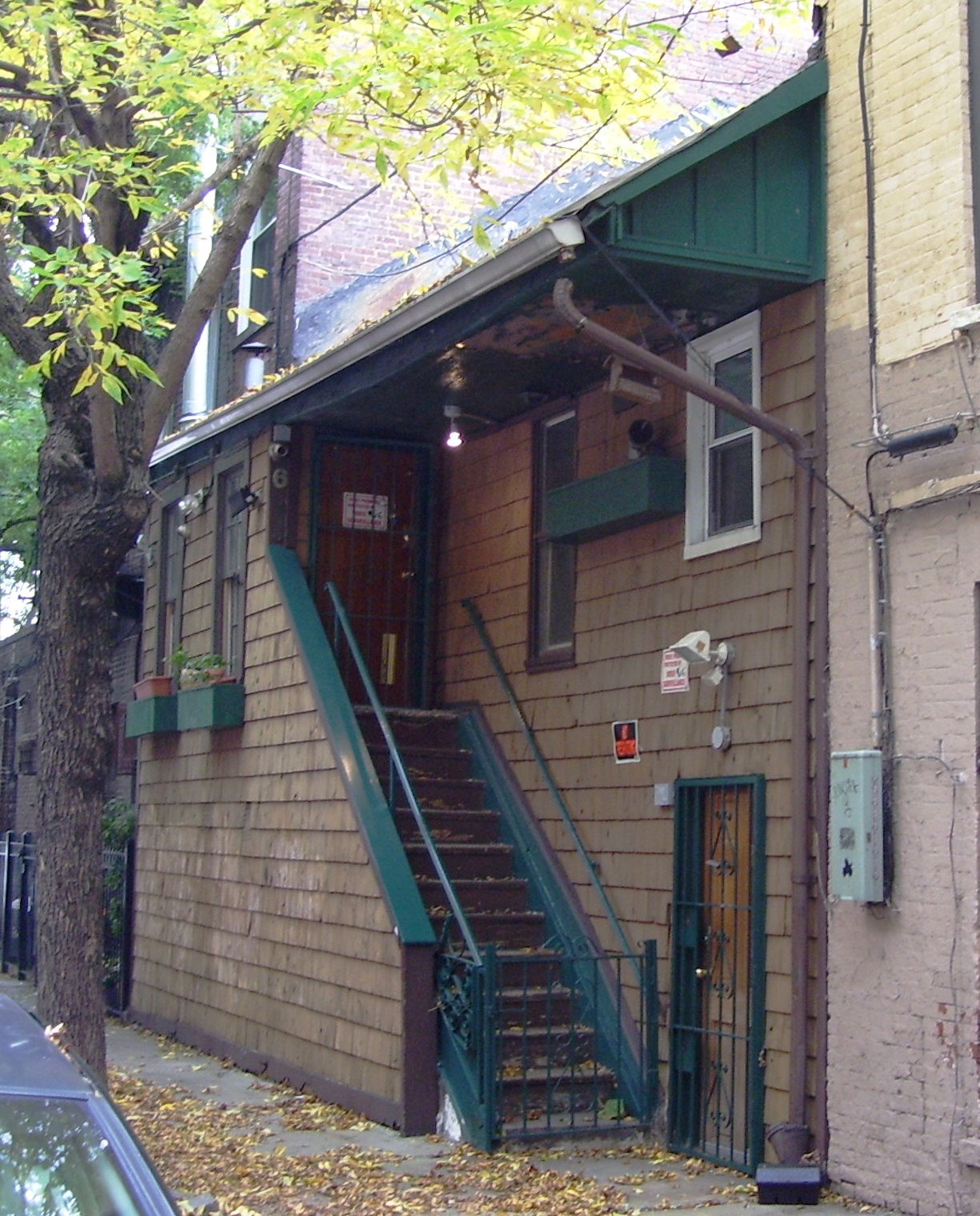
392–393 West Street 6 Weehawken Street from north

In December 2016 Bourgeois announced he was giving his $4 million historic house in New York City to former chief of the Ramapough Mountain Indians, Jay Van Dunk, for use as a prayer house. The building, located at 6 Weehawken Street in the West Village (also known as 392–393 West Street) was formerly a historic public market. However, he reneged on his plan.

== Death ==
Bourgeois died at his home in New York City on December 8, 2022, at the age of 82.
