= Huma Bhabha =

American sculptor (born 1962)

- We Come in Peace (2018) by Huma Bhabha at the Hirshhorn Museum and Sculpture Garden in Washington, DC
- Born: 1962 (age 63–64); Karachi, Pakistan
- Education: Rhode Island School of Design, Columbia University
- Known for: Sculpture

Huma Bhabha (born 1962) is a Pakistani-American sculptor based in Poughkeepsie, New York. Known for her uniquely grotesque, figurative forms that often appear dissected or dismembered, Bhabha often uses found materials in her sculptures, including styrofoam, cork, rubber, paper, wire, and clay. She occasionally incorporates objects given to her by other people into her artwork. Many of these sculptures are also cast in bronze. She is equally prolific in her works on paper, creating vivid pastel drawings, eerie photographic collages, and haunting print editions.

== Early life and education ==
Bhabha was born in Karachi, Pakistan. Her mother was an artist, though did not work as one professionally. Bhabha's childhood home was full of art books, and her mother would often help her with projects. By high school, Huma enjoyed drawing and painting and had started to think about becoming a professional artist.

Travelling to the United States to study in 1981, Bhabha received her B.F.A. at the Rhode Island School of Design (1985), where she majored in printmaking while also taking classes in painting. After graduating, she returned to Pakistan for nearly 2 years. After her father died in 1986, she returned to the United States and attended Columbia University, where she earned her M.F.A. (1989). While at Columbia, she made paintings using found wood and metal instead of canvas, which allowed her to incorporate formal qualities such as shape, space, and color. Starting in her second year at Columbia, she worked as an assistant to artist Meyer Vaisman, from whom she learned how to be a professional artist. She continued working for him after she graduated and leveraged the professional connection to network and meet people in the art world.

Bhabha lived in New York City until 2002, when she moved to Poughkeepsie, New York, where she currently resides and works. She lives with her husband, Jason Fox, who is also an artist and whom she married in 1990.

== Work ==
Bhabha describes her sculptures as “characters” that, through their materiality, rough construction, and references to the history of sculpture, become rich screens for projections of psychological depth. Bhabha's work draws from a broad and eclectic range of influences, incorporating art-historical references to everything from classical and African sculpture to the works of modernists like Picasso, Brancusi, and Giacometti. At the same time, the works also recall elements of popular culture, especially the dystopic visions of science-fiction pioneers Philip K. Dick and J.G. Ballard. She has also noted that science-fiction and horror films, particularly the work of David Cronenberg, have contributed to motifs of puppetry and mutation in her work. Between 2002 and 2004, Bhabha worked for a taxidermist, through which she obtained discarded animal skulls. Some of these skulls have appeared in her work.

Huma never studied sculpture in art school, so her pieces were originally created through a process of trial and error. She originally started experimenting with plastics, foam rubber, and spray paint, as well as found objects such as feathers and panty hose. By 1992, she knew she wanted to create three-dimensional works.

In 2000, she began to incorporate elements of Robert Rauschenberg's style of immediacy into her works. She was particularly struck by his piece, Centaur, because it was different from what she had been doing and referenced other kinds of art she liked. Until that moment, she had always felt her work had a defined process: a beginning, a middle, and an end. After this stylistic shift, she realized she could organically choose a stopping point when she felt that her work had reached an interesting stage. This mentality is what lead her to produce one of her most recognizable pieces, Untitled, in 2001. She was in the midst of sculpting a clay figure when she discovered that the plastic bag she was using to keep the clay moist could serve double purpose as a sculptural element in itself. The figure resembled a body bag or a Muslim praying, which was especially relevant to her in light of the recently started war in Afghanistan.

She says of her own work, “I’m interested in a suicide of the self when I make the work: no country, no gender, etc. I don't want the work to be tied to any one specific self or ideology. When you are nothing, you can become everything.”

== Exhibitions ==
Bhabha's work has been featured in exhibitions widely in North America and Europe, including major group exhibitions such as "Fourth Plinth Shortlist Exhibition" at the National Gallery, London, Greater New York at MoMA PS1 (2005 and 2015); Heritage Store Rosewater Spray with Atomizer 8-Ounce Bottle USA Today: New American Art from the Saatchi Gallery at the Royal Academy of Arts, London (2006; traveled to the State Hermitage Museum, St. Petersburg, Russia, 2007); the 2008 Gwangju Biennial; the 2012 Paris Triennial; the Museum of Modern Art, New York (2010 and 2011); the 2010 Whitney Biennial at the Whitney Museum of American Art, New York; Biennale Internazionale di Scultura di Carrara (2010) and the 2015 Venice Biennale.

The artist's first solo museum exhibition took place in 2008 at the Aldrich Contemporary Art Museum. She has also had solo exhibitions at MoMA PS1 (2012–2013), Collezione Marmotti, Reggio Emilia, Italy (2012), and the Aspen Art Museum in Aspen (2011–2012). Bhabha created a site-specific work titled "We Come in Peace" for the roof garden at The Metropolitan Museum of Art (2018). Other solo exhibitions include ICA Boston (2019); the Sydney Biennale (2020); and M Leuven (2023).

== Awards and grants ==
The Aldrich Contemporary Art Museum in Ridgefield, Connecticut, awarded its 2008 Emerging Artist Award to Bhabha. The award came with a $5,000 prize and a solo exhibition at the museum (September 14, 2008 – February 8, 2009). Her first solo museum exhibition in New York was in 2012 at MoMA PS1: Huma Bhabha: Unnatural Histories was organized by Peter Eleey, Curator, MoMA PS1, with Lizzie Gorfaine, Curatorial Assistant (November 18, 2012 – April 1, 2013).

Bhabha was featured as one of sixteen creative thinkers in the 2012 film From Nothing, Something: A documentary on the creative process, which has screened at multiple film festivals including the Newport Beach Film Festival.

In 2013 Bhabha was awarded a Berlin Prize Fellowship at the American Academy in Berlin. In 2016 she was honored by the Museum of Modern Art, New York during the museum's annual "Party in the Garden" celebration, and also served on the jury of the prestigious Nasher Prize, awarded by the Nasher Sculpture Center, Dallas (the prize was awarded in 2017 to artist Pierre Huygue).

== Collections ==
Huma Bhabha's work is included in the following public collections:

- Art Gallery of New South Wales, Sydney, Australia
- Albright-Knox Art Gallery, Buffalo, New York
- Bronx Museum of Art, Bronx, New York
- Museum of Fine Arts, Houston, Texas
- Museum of Modern Art (MoMA), New York City, New York
- Metropolitan Museum of Art (The Met), New York City, New York
- Print and Stokes Galleries, New York Public Library, New York City, New York
- Nerman Museum of Contemporary Art, Overland Park, Kansas
- Centre Georges Pompidou, Paris, France
- Whitney Museum of American Art, New York City, New York
- Tate Modern, London, England.
- Weatherspoon Art Museum, Greensboro, North Carolina

== See also ==
- List of Pakistani women artists
