= We Come in Peace =

2018 sculptural installation by Huma Bhabha

- We Come in Peace in 2022
- Artist: Huma Bhabha
- Year: 2018
- Medium: Bronze and paint
- Location: Hirshhorn Museum and Sculpture Garden, Washington, DC

We Come in Peace is a sculptural installation created in 2018 by Huma Bhabha, a New York–based Pakistani-American sculptor, originally commissioned for the Iris and B. Gerald Cantor Roof Garden of the Metropolitan Museum of Art. The original installation consisted of two sculptures, named We Come in Peace and Benaam, which means "nameless" in Urdu, and was first displayed from April to October 2018. We Come in Peace is a 12 ft (3.7 m) tall standing figure, while Benaam is a 18 ft (5.5 m) long figure lying prostrate. The standing figure was acquired by the Hirshhorn Museum and Sculpture Garden in Washington, DC.

== Description ==
The sculptures are made of clay, styrofoam, and cork, then cast in bronze to allow them to withstand the elements and look more demonic. The title of the installation makes reference to a 1951 film, The Day the Earth Stood Still. According to AM New York, Bhabha viewed the characters as cooperative, with We Come in Peace coming to aid Benaam, but arriving too late because Benaam has already died – though to her mind the latter might still "rise up ... [t]hings that you would not imagine might happen. That's the hope."

While Bhabha considers the work to be "very much an anti-war statement", she also wanted it to be multi-layered and open to a wide variety of interpretations. According to AM New York, the We Come in Peace sculpture is gender fluid.

== Critical reception ==
Scott Lynch of Gothamist, remarking on the pieces' diversity of inspiration, observed, "Both pieces allude to a wide swath of art history, from ancient African and Indian sculpture to contemporary works by the likes of Basquiat and David Hammons". He said that the sculptures created an "ominous but open-ended narrative, inviting visitors to explore their own thematic interpretations: subjugation and supplication, respect, fear, and/or adoration; social upheaval and displacement; gender, power, and 'memories of place.'"

Martha Schwendener of The New York Times described the installation as "a spare and unsettling sculptural installation", that "ripples" with associations of "colonization, invasion, imperialism". She suggests that the work invites the observer to consider the sheer strangeness of extraterrestrial or "post-humanity" lifeforms as they would likely be experienced by humankind, but that such encounters may ultimately offer the possibility of a "melding of cultures and aesthetics that might be harmonious rather than imperialist."

Describing the work as "eerie, other, unnerving, ambiguous, even alarming", Jerry Saltz for Vulture saw the work as a critique of the West: its "vivisected, gouged idol covered in blotchy graffiti could be from any photograph seen daily of the mayhem in the Middle East, just part of the carnage, interventions, and wars [Bhabha] has called a 'systematic demonization and humiliation of the people and their ancient and present Islamic cultures' ... [h]er Met installation is a vivid rebuke of what the West says to all the cultures it invades: We come in peace." He assessed the work as "among the best Met roof sculpture installations since the program began in 1987."
