= Yangzhou =

Yangzhou 扬州市 Yangchow
- Prefecture-level city
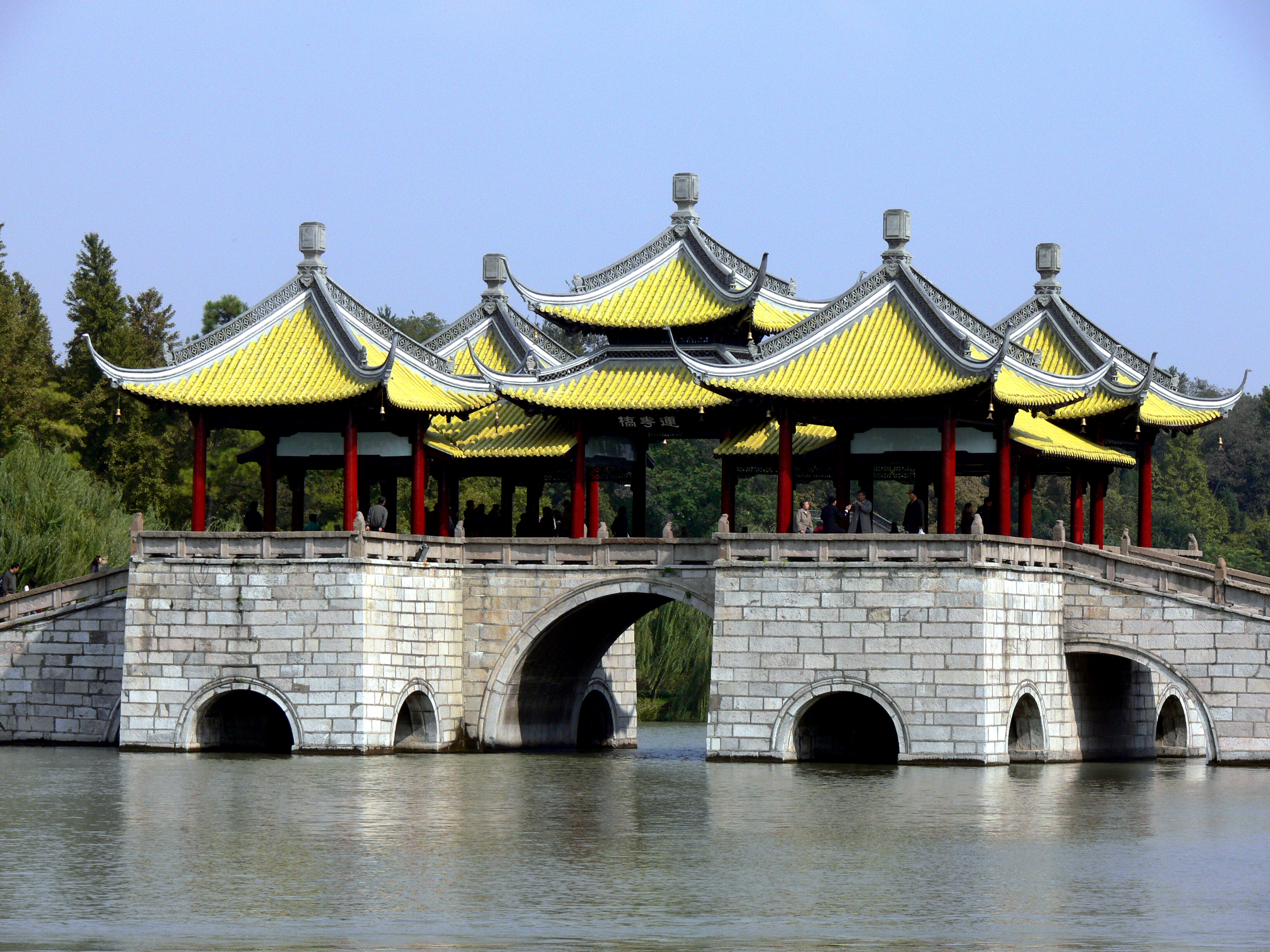
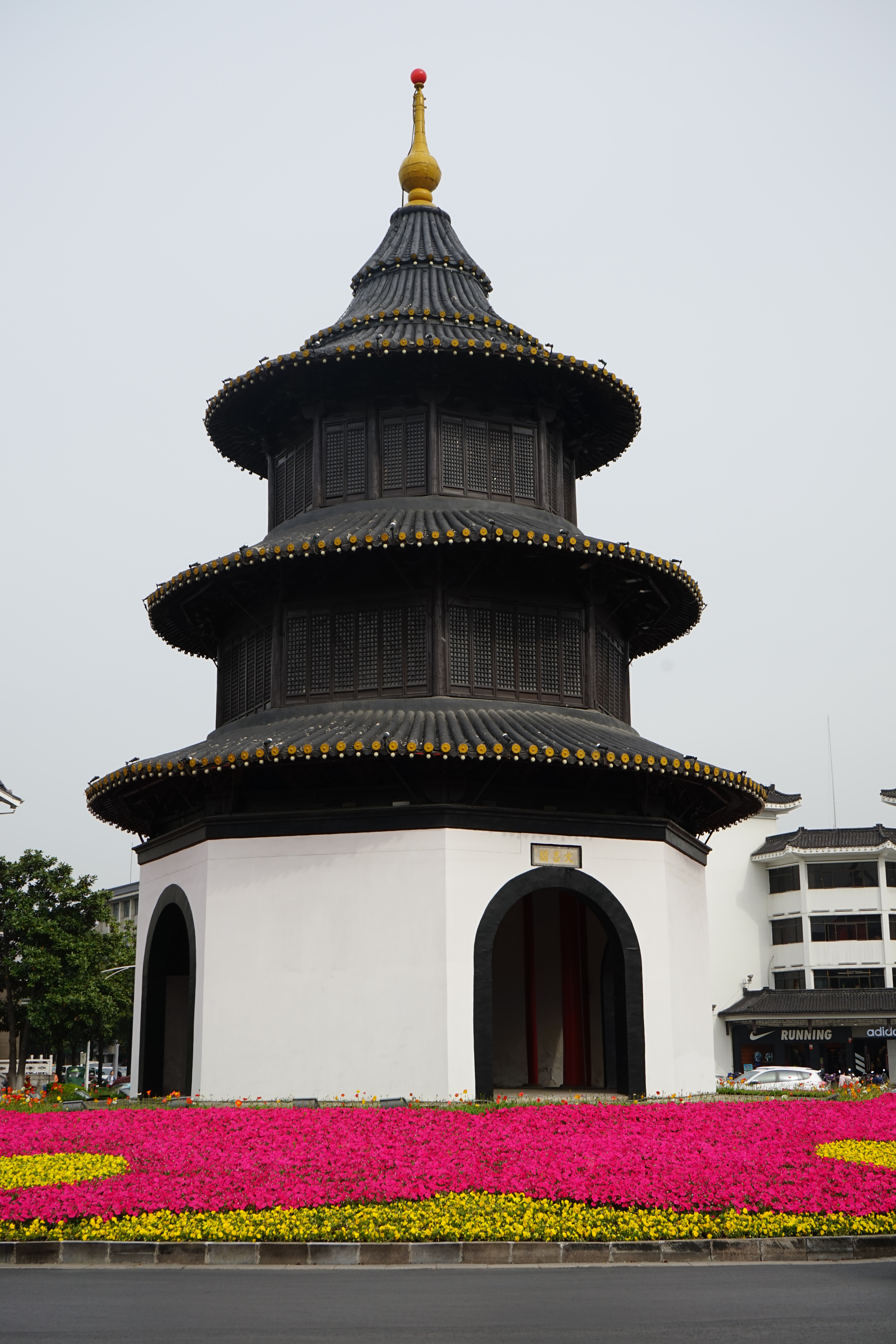
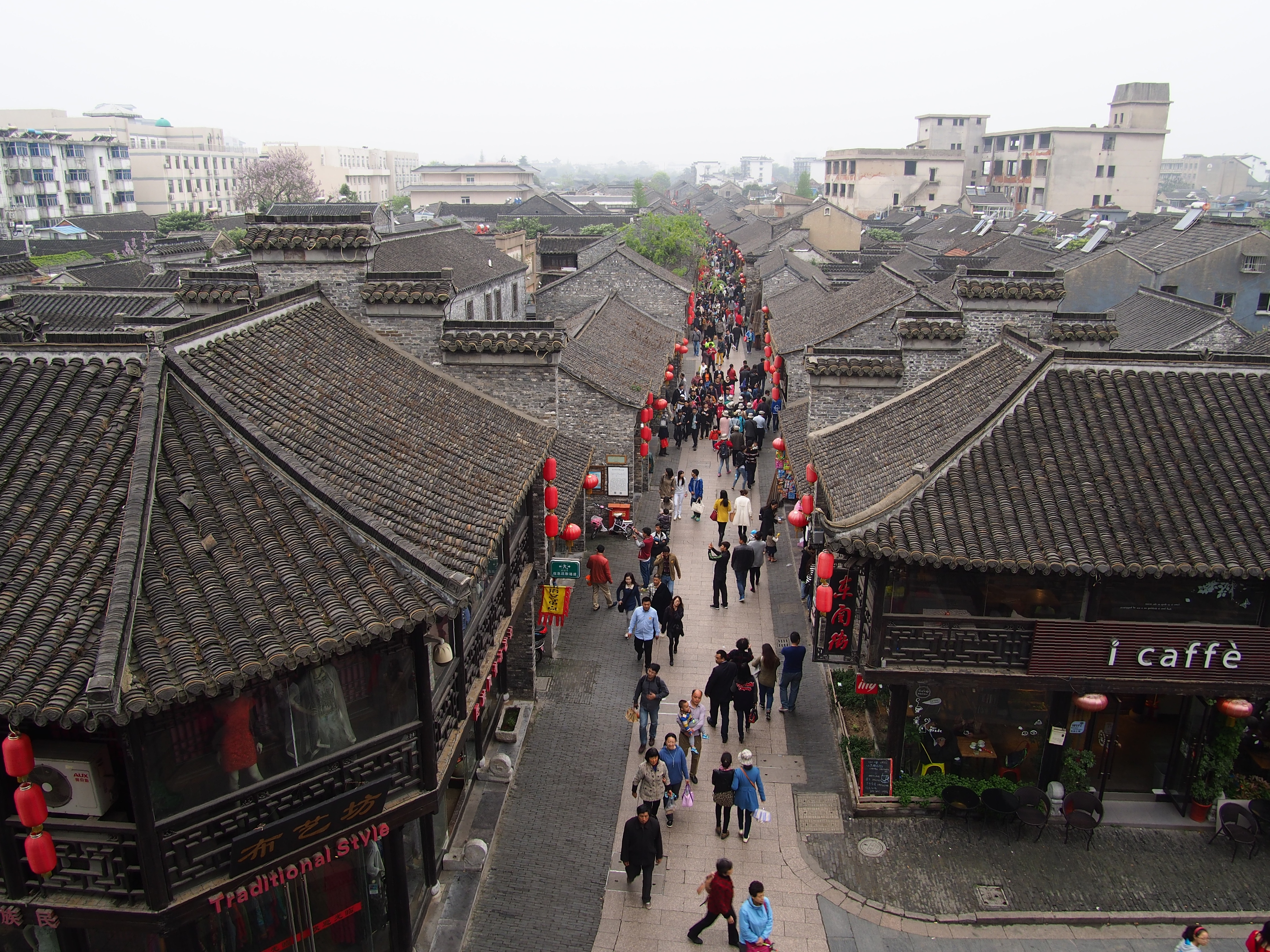
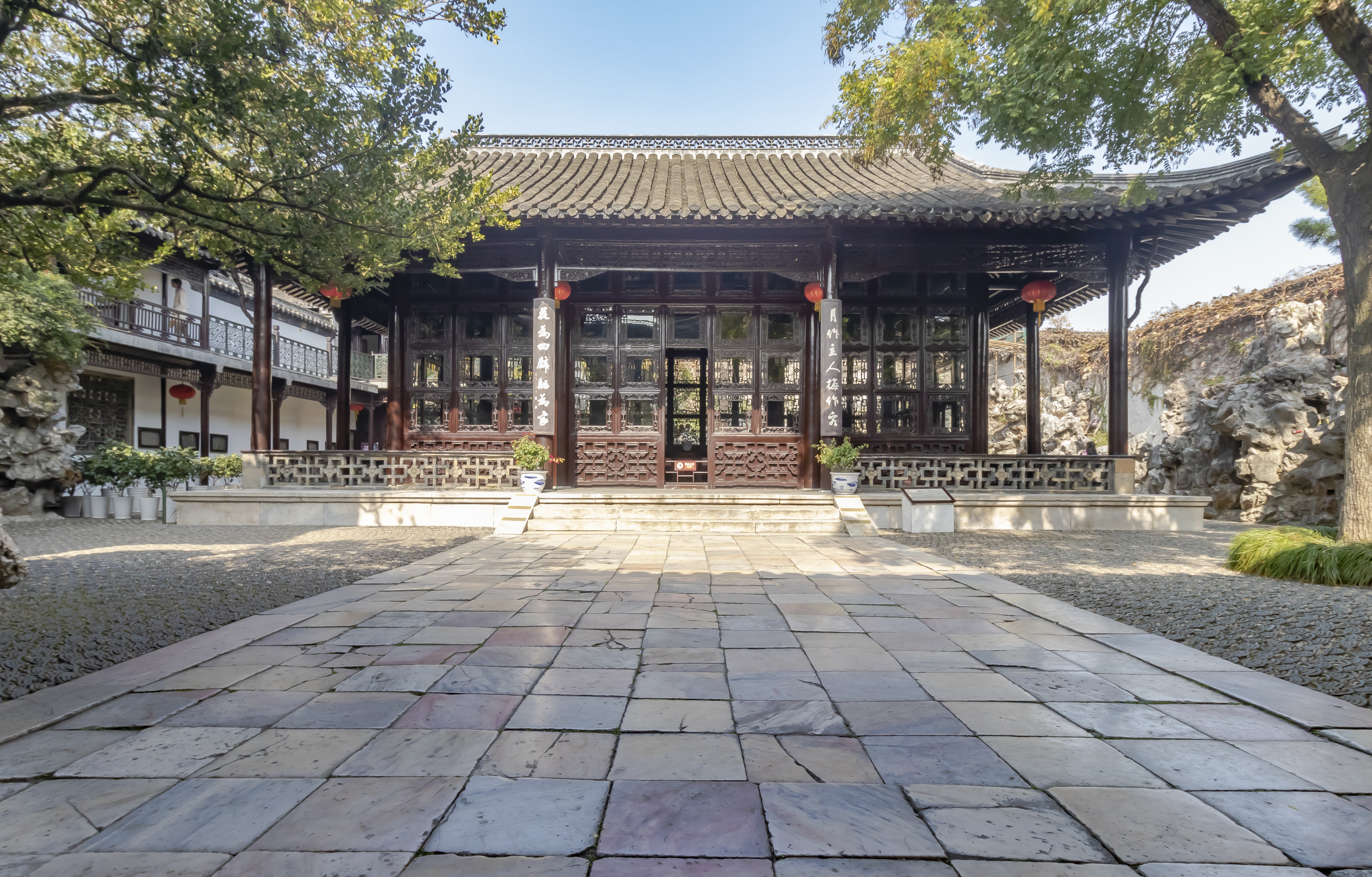
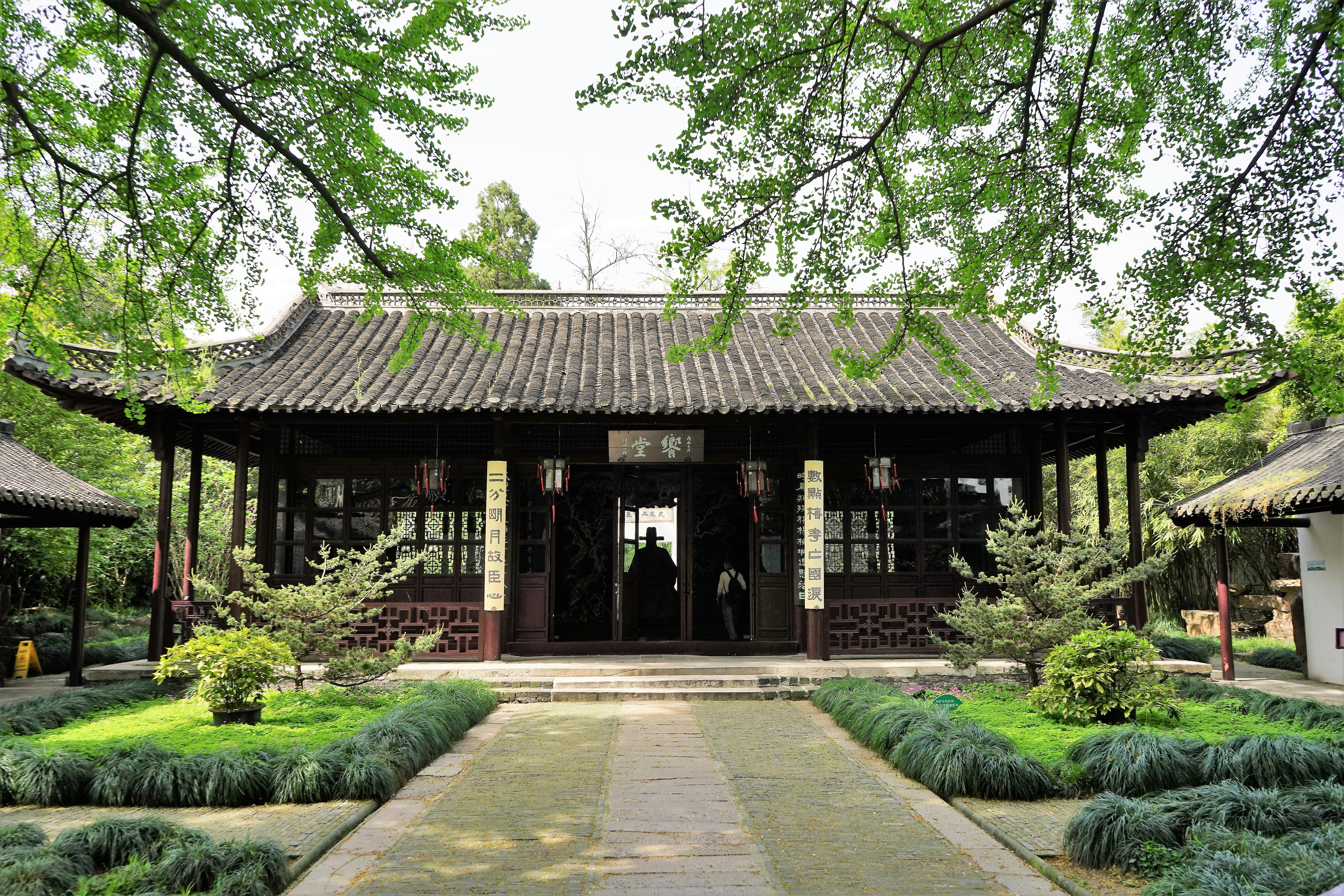
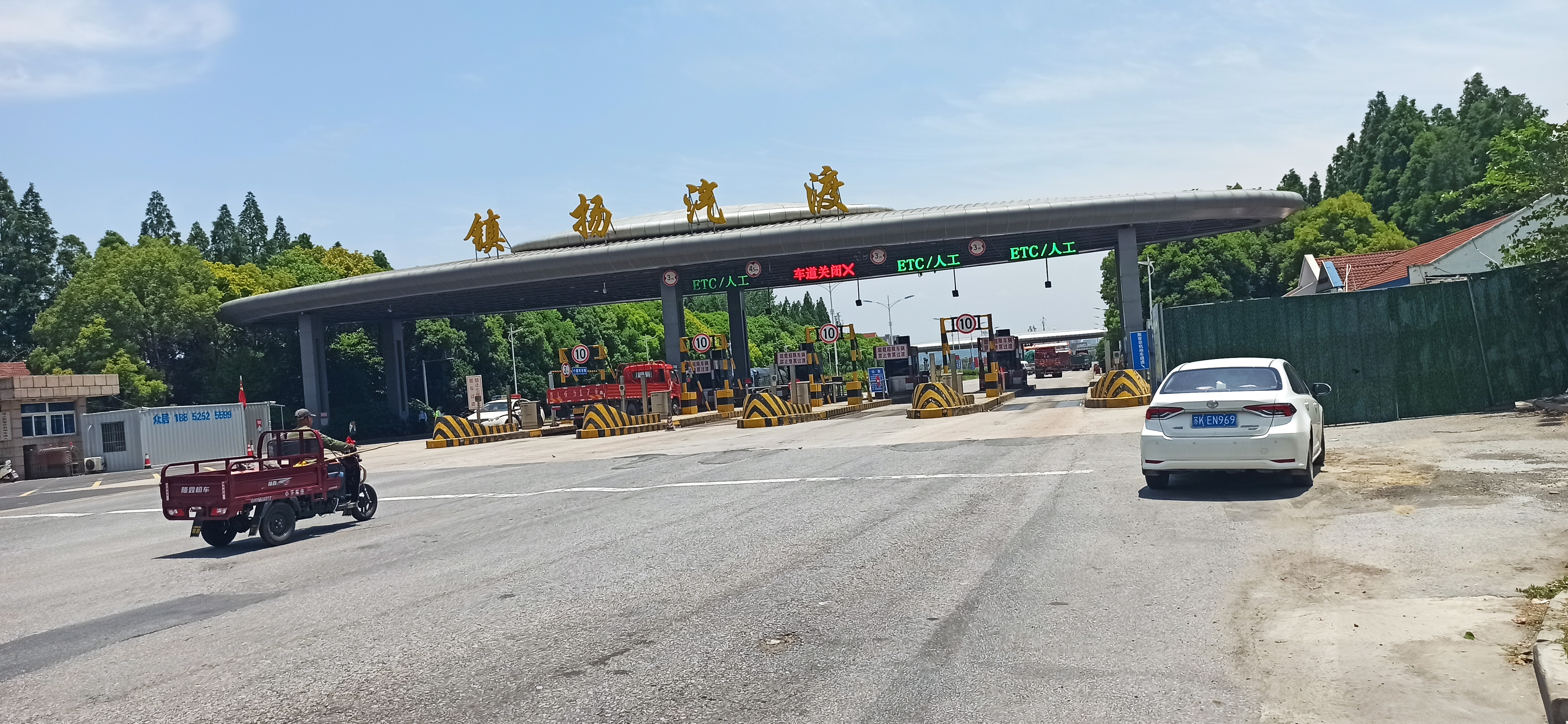
- Five-Pavilion Bridge of the Slender West Lake Wenchang Pavilion Dongguan Street He Garden Memorial Hall of Shi Kefa Ferry to Zhenjiang in Guazhou

- Location of Yangzhou administrative area in Jiangsu

- Location of the city center in Jiangsu Yangzhou (Eastern China) Yangzhou (China)
- Coordinates (Yangzhou municipal government): 32°23′40″N 119°24′46″E
- Country: People's Republic of China
- Province: Jiangsu
- County-level divisions: 6 (3 Districts, 2 County-level cities, 1 County)
- Municipal seat: Hanjiang District

Government
  - Communist Party Chief: Zheng Haitao (郑海涛)
  - Mayor: Ren Dong (任栋)

Area
  - Prefecture-level city: 6,626 km^{2} (2,558 sq mi)
  - Urban (2018): 363 km^{2} (140 sq mi)
  - Metro: 2,310 km^{2} (890 sq mi)

Population (2020 census)
  - Prefecture-level city: 4,559,797
  - Density: 688.2/km^{2} (1,782/sq mi)
  - Urban (2018): 1,665,000
  - Urban density: 4,590/km^{2} (11,900/sq mi)
  - Metro: 2,635,435
  - Metro density: 1,140/km^{2} (2,950/sq mi)
- Includes only those with Hukou permits

GDP (2025)
  - Prefecture-level city: CN¥ 805.675 billion
- Time zone: UTC+8 (Beijing Time)
- Postal code: 225000
- Telephone: (0)514
- ISO 3166 code: CN-JS-10
- Licence plate prefixes: 苏K
- Website: yangzhou.gov.cn/english

Yangzhou
- "Yangzhou" in Simplified (top) and Traditional (bottom) Chinese characters
- Traditional Chinese: 揚州
- Simplified Chinese: 扬州
- Literal meaning: [Seat of] Yang Province
Transcriptions
Standard Mandarin
- Hanyu Pinyin: Yángzhōu
- Wade–Giles: Yang-chou
- IPA: [jǎŋ.ʈʂóʊ]
Wu
- Romanization: Yang-tseu
Yue: Cantonese
- Jyutping: Joeng⁴ Zau¹

Historical Names Hancheng
- Chinese: 邗城
- Literal meaning: Han City
Transcriptions
Standard Mandarin
- Hanyu Pinyin: Hánchéng
- Wade–Giles: Han-cheng

Guangling
- Traditional Chinese: 廣陵
- Simplified Chinese: 广陵
- Literal meaning: Expansive Tomb
Transcriptions
Standard Mandarin
- Hanyu Pinyin: Guǎnglíng
- Wade–Giles: Kuang-ling

Jiangdu
- Chinese: 江都
- Literal meaning: Capital on the [Yangtze] River
Transcriptions
Standard Mandarin
- Hanyu Pinyin: Jiāngdū
- Wade–Giles: Chiang-tu

Yangzhou is a prefecture-level city in central Jiangsu Province, East China. Sitting on the north bank of the Yangtze, it borders the provincial capital Nanjing to the southwest, Huai'an to the north, Yancheng to the northeast, Taizhou to the east, and Zhenjiang across the river to the south. Its population was 4,559,797 at the 2020 census and its urban area is home to 2,635,435 inhabitants, including three urban districts, currently in the agglomeration.

Historically, Yangzhou was one of the wealthiest cities in China, known at various periods for its great merchant families, poets, artists, and scholars. Its name (lit. "Rising Prefecture") refers to its former position as the capital of the ancient Yangzhou prefecture in imperial China. Yangzhou was one of the first cities to benefit from one of the earliest World Bank loans in China, used to construct Yangzhou thermal power station in 1994.

Yangzhou is also a major city for scientific research outputs, appearing among the world's top 200 cities as of 2024.

== Administration ==
Currently, the prefecture-level city of Yangzhou administers six county-level divisions, including three districts, two county-level cities and one county. Accordingly, they are further divided into 98 township-level divisions, including 87 towns and townships, and 11 subdistricts.

Map
Subdivision	Simplified Chinese	Hanyu Pinyin	Population (2020)	Area (km^{2})	Density (/km^{2})
City Proper
Guangling District	广陵区	Guǎnglíng Qū	542,305	423.09	805.92
Hanjiang District	邗江区	Hánjiāng Qū	726,906	552.68	1,902.23
Suburban
Jiangdu District	江都区	Jiāngdū Qū	926,577	1,329.90	757.03
Rural
Baoying County	宝应县	Bǎoyìng Xiàn	682,219	1,461.55	514.57
Satellite cities (County-level cities)
Yizheng	仪征市	Yízhēng Shì	532,571	902.20	625.08
Gaoyou	高邮市	Gāoyóu Shì	709,572	1,921.78	387.49
Total			4,559,797	6,591.21	676.62
In November 2011, Weiyang District (维扬区) was merged into Hanjiang District, while the former county-level Jiangdu City became Jiangdu District.

== History ==
=== Ancient China ===
During the Spring and Autumn period of the Eastern Zhou dynasty, the hegemon Fuchai of Wu constructed the Han or Hangou Canal (t 邗溝, s 邗沟, Hángōu) to improve his supply lines from his center of power around present-day Suzhou to the North China Plain, where he was engaged in an ongoing conflict with Qi. Taking advantage of the many streams and lakes of the Jianghuai Plain, the canal connected the Yangtze River within present-day Yangzhou to the Huai River within present-day Huai'an by 486 BC. The next year, Fuchai established a fortress to protect the southern end of the new canal at Hancheng. Following the Chinese urban design principles of the time, it was constructed as a 3 li by 3 li square about 12 m (39 ft) above the water level on the Yangtze's northern bank, with the Han Canal forming a moat around the southern and eastern sides of the city. The town was intended to stall any possible counterattack from Qi down the canal, giving time to raise reinforcements from Suzhou and Wu's other lands in the Yangtze Delta.

=== Imperial China ===
Under the Eastern Han dynasty, the area was organized as the Guangling Commandery of Xu Province. Its seat of government—also known as Guangling—was also near the confluence of the Yangtze and the Han Canal, although at a slightly different location than the former Wu fortress.

Under the Sui, Guangling was reorganized as Yang Province (zhou) in the year AD 590. Its seat of government took the new name as well. Prospering as the Emperor Yang (r. 604–617) connected the Han Canal to other waterways north and south to form the core of the Grand Canal, Yangzhou became the southern capital of China under the name Jiangdu. With the failure of his invasions of Korea and a series of natural disasters, Emperor Yang abandoned to north entirely in 616 and made Jiangdu his primary capital until his assassination in 618.

Restoring the former name Guangling, the Tang made the city a major port for foreign trade and turned it into a leading economic and cultural center. Many foreign merchants lived in the city, including many Koreans, Arabs, and Persians. Thousands of Muslim Arab, Persian and other foreign merchants were massacred in 760 by forces under Tian Shengong, sent to suppress the city's rebellion.

Jiangdu served briefly as the capital of a revived Wu Kingdom during the Five Dynasties and Ten Kingdoms period.

After the 1127 Jingkang Incident led to the Jurchen-led Jin conquest of Kaifeng, the Song used Yangzhou as their capital in 1128 and 1129. Song troops under Du Chong (杜充, Dù Chōng, d. 1141) breached the southern embankments of the Yellow River in an effort to stop the southward of Jin army, but the resulting avulsion caused the river to swing south of the Shandong Peninsula and capture the Si River and lower Huai. The Grand Canal was truncated for decades and the Southern Song moved to Lin'an (present-day Hangzhou, Zhejiang).

In 1280, during the Yuan, Yangzhou was the site of a massive gunpowder explosion when the bomb warehouse of the Weiyang arsenal accidentally caught fire. The blast killed over a hundred guards, hurled debris from buildings into the air that landed 10 li away, and could be felt 100 li. Marco Polo claimed to have served Kubilai Khan in Yangzhou shortly thereafter, variously placed at 1282–1285 or 1282–1287. Although some versions of Polo's memoirs imply that he was the governor of Yangzhou, it is more likely that he was an official in the salt industry if he was employed there at all. Surviving Chinese texts do not mention him at all. It is well documented, however, that Kublai Khan trusted foreigners more than Chinese/Han subjects in internal affairs and the discovery of the 1342 tomb of Caterina Vilioni, member of an Italian trading family in Yangzhou, does, however, suggest the existence of an Italian community in the city in the 14th century. Moreover, both in The Travels of Marco Polo and in the History of Yuan there is documentation about a Nestorian Christian who funded two churches in China during the three years he served as an official of the emperor. This functionary is named "Mar Sarchis" by Marco Polo and "Ma Xuelijisi" in the History of Yuan. This person served as a supervisor in the prefecture of Zhenjiang. Arabic inscriptions during the 13th and 14th centuries similarly indicate a revival of the Muslim community.

During the Ming dynasty (1368–1644) until the 19th century Yangzhou acted as a major trade exchange center for salt (a government regulated commodity), rice, and silk. The Ming were largely responsible for building the city as it now stands and surrounding it with 9 km (5.6 mi) of walls, in part as protection against Wokou raids.

There was a Hui or Chinese Muslim community in Yangzhou during the Yuan, Ming and Qing dynasties with historic mosques like Crane Mosque and the tomb of Sayyid Puhaddin.

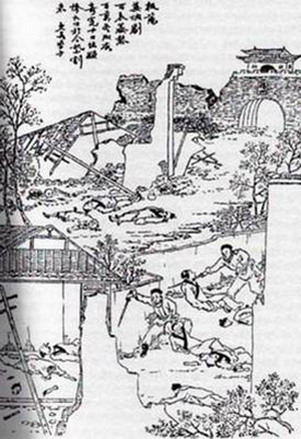
A late Qing artist conception of the Yangzhou massacre.

After the fall of Beijing and northern China to the Manchus in 1644, Yangzhou remained under the control of the short-lived Southern Ming based in Nanjing. Qing forces led by Prince Dodo reached Yangzhou in the spring of 1645, and despite the heroic efforts of its chief defender, Shi Kefa, the city fell on May 20, 1645, after a brief siege. The Yangzhou massacre followed; Wang Xiuchu's contemporary account alleged that the number of victims was close to 800,000, but that number is certainly an exaggeration. Shi Kefa himself was killed by the Manchus when he refused to switch his allegiance to the Manchurian Qing regime. Han bannermen were responsible for most of the atrocities in Yangzhou but they were nevertheless labelled as Manchus by other Han.

The city's rapid recovery from these events and its great prosperity through the early and middle years of the Qing dynasty were due to its role as administrative center of the Lianghuai sector of the government salt monopoly. As early as 1655, the Dutch envoy Johan Nieuhof described the city of Yangzhoufu (Jamcefu in his transcription):

This Trade alone has so very much enrich'd the Inhabitants of this Town, that they have re-built their City since the last destruction by the Tartars, erecting it in as great splendor as it was at first.

Famed at that time and since for literature, art, and the gardens of its merchant families, many of which were visited by the Kangxi and Qianlong emperors during their Southern Tours, the Qing-era Yangzhou has been the focus of intensive research by historians.

The Yangzhou riot in 1868 was a pivotal moment of Anglo-Chinese relations during late Qing China that almost led to war. The crisis was fomented by the scholar-officials of the city, who opposed the presence of foreign Christian missionaries there. The riot that resulted was an angry crowd estimated at eight to ten thousand who assaulted the premises of the British China Inland Mission in Yangzhou by looting, burning and attacking the missionaries led by Hudson Taylor. No one was killed, however several of the missionaries were injured as they were forced to flee for their lives. As a result of the report of the riot, the British consul in Shanghai, Sir Walter Henry Medhurst took seventy Royal Marines in a man-of-war and steamed up the Yangtze to Nanjing in a controversial show of force that eventually resulted in an official apology from Viceroy Zeng Guofan and financial restitution made to the injured missionaries.

=== Modern China ===
From the time of the Taiping Rebellion (1853) to the beginning of the Reform Era (1980) Yangzhou was in decline, due to war damage, neglect of the Grand Canal as railways replaced it in importance, and stagnation in the early decades of the PRC. During the Second Sino-Japanese War, it endured eight years of Japanese occupation and was used by the enemy as a site for internment camps. About 1200 civilians of Allied nationalities (mostly British and Australian) from Shanghai were transported here in 1943, and located in one of three camps (A, B, and C). Camps B and C were closed down in September, 1943, after the second American-Japanese prisoner exchange, and their inhabitants transferred back to Shanghai camps. Camp C, located in the former American Mission in the north-west of the city, was maintained for the duration of the war.

Among early plans for railways in the late Qing was one for a line that would connect Yangzhou to the north but this was jettisoned in favor of an alternative route. The city's status as a leading economic center in China was never to be restored. Not until the 1990s did it begin to regain some semblance of prosperity, benefitting from national economic growth and a number of targeted development projects. With the canal now partially restored, and excellent rail and road connections, Yangzhou is once again an important transportation and market center. It also has some industrial output, chiefly in cotton and textiles. In 2004, a railway linked Yangzhou for the first time with Nanjing.

== Geography ==
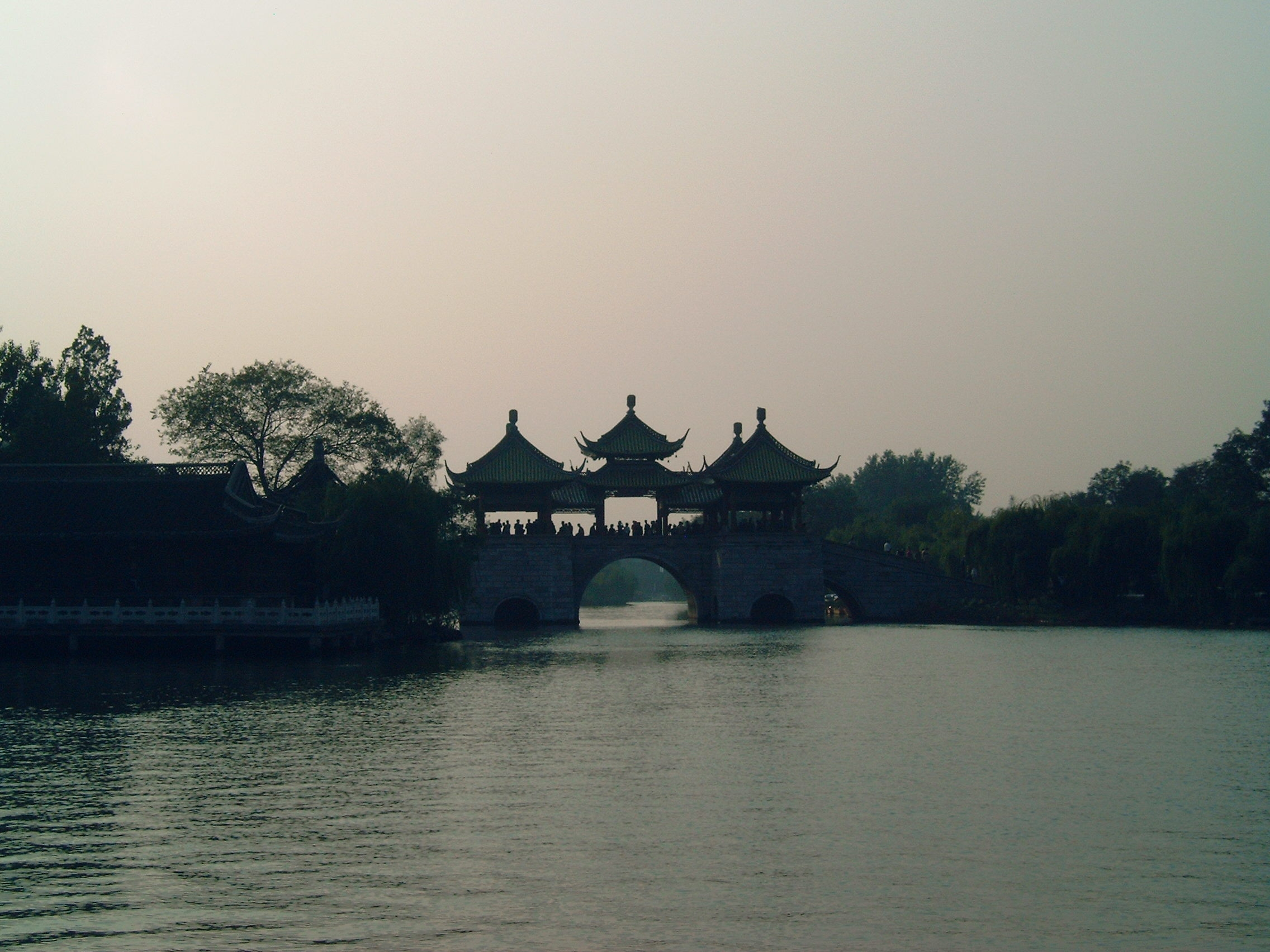
The Five Pavilion Bridge over the Slender West Lake.

Yangzhou is located on a plain north of the Yangtze. The Grand Canal, also known as the Jing-Hang Canal, crosses the prefecture-level from the north to the south; its modern route passes through the eastern outskirts of Yangzhou's main urban area, while its old route runs through the city center. Other major bodies of water within the prefecture-level city include the Baoshe River, Datong River, Beichengzi River, Tongyang Canal, Xintongyang Canal, Baima Lake, Baoying Lake, Gaoyou Lake and Shaobo Lake.

Like much of the entire prefecture-level city, Yangzhou's main urban area (the "city proper") is criss-crossed by an intricate network of canals and small lakes. The historic city center (the former waled city) is surrounded by canals on all sides: the Old Grand Canal forms its eastern and southern boundaries; the City Moat Canal runs along the former walled city's northern edge, connecting the Old Grand Canal with the Slender West Lake; the Erdaohe Canal runs along the old city's western edge, from the Slender West Lake to the Lotus Flower Pond (Hehuachi), which in its turn is connected by the short Erdaogou canal with the Old Grand Canal. It is possible to sail a small water craft from the Thin West Lake, via the Erdaohe, the Hehua Pond, and the Erdaogou into the Old Grand Canal.

=== Climate ===
Yangzhou has a subtropical monsoon climate with humid changeable wind; longer winters for about 4 months, summers 4 months and shorter springs and autumns, 2 months respectively; frost-free period of around 240 days and annual average sunshine of around 1,912 hours.

The mean annual temperature is 16.2 °C (61.2 °F) annually, with an annual average daily maximum temperature of 20.7 °C (69.3 °F) and an annual average daily minimum temperature of 12.4 °C (54.3 °F). The normal monthly mean 24-hour temperature ranges from 2.8 °C (37.0 °F) in January to 28.4 °C (83.1 °F) in July.

The annual average precipitation is 1,099.9 mm (43.30 in), and about 59.1% of rainfall is concentrated in the summer. The rainy season known as "plum rain season" usually lasts from mid-June to mid-July. During this season, the plums are ripening, hence the name plum rain. Extreme temperatures since 1951 has ranged from −17.7 °C (0 °F) on 6 January 1955 to 40.6 °C (105 °F) on 14 August 2022 during the 2022 China Heatwave.

Climate data for Yangzhou, elevation 10 m (33 ft), (1991–2020 normals, extremes 1951–present)
Month	Jan	Feb	Mar	Apr	May	Jun	Jul	Aug	Sep	Oct	Nov	Dec	Year
Record high °C (°F)	21.5 (70.7)	26.9 (80.4)	34.1 (93.4)	34.1 (93.4)	36.5 (97.7)	37.6 (99.7)	40.3 (104.5)	40.6 (105.1)	37.5 (99.5)	39.1 (102.4)	30.0 (86.0)	23.8 (74.8)	40.6 (105.1)
Mean daily maximum °C (°F)	7.0 (44.6)	9.7 (49.5)	14.7 (58.5)	21.1 (70.0)	26.4 (79.5)	29.2 (84.6)	32.3 (90.1)	31.7 (89.1)	27.7 (81.9)	22.6 (72.7)	16.3 (61.3)	9.6 (49.3)	20.7 (69.3)
Daily mean °C (°F)	2.8 (37.0)	5.1 (41.2)	9.8 (49.6)	15.9 (60.6)	21.4 (70.5)	24.9 (76.8)	28.4 (83.1)	27.8 (82.0)	23.5 (74.3)	17.8 (64.0)	11.4 (52.5)	5.0 (41.0)	16.2 (61.0)
Mean daily minimum °C (°F)	−0.5 (31.1)	1.5 (34.7)	5.7 (42.3)	11.3 (52.3)	17.0 (62.6)	21.4 (70.5)	25.2 (77.4)	24.8 (76.6)	20.1 (68.2)	13.8 (56.8)	7.4 (45.3)	1.3 (34.3)	12.4 (54.3)
Record low °C (°F)	−17.7 (0.1)	−15.8 (3.6)	−9.6 (14.7)	−1.8 (28.8)	3.6 (38.5)	12.0 (53.6)	15.9 (60.6)	17.9 (64.2)	9.9 (49.8)	0.1 (32.2)	−6.2 (20.8)	−12.0 (10.4)	−17.7 (0.1)
Average precipitation mm (inches)	50.5 (1.99)	49.1 (1.93)	75.8 (2.98)	69.6 (2.74)	86.2 (3.39)	165.2 (6.50)	210.3 (8.28)	174.2 (6.86)	74.3 (2.93)	54.0 (2.13)	54.1 (2.13)	36.6 (1.44)	1,099.9 (43.3)
Average precipitation days (≥ 0.1 mm)	8.7	8.9	9.9	9.1	9.5	10.7	13.1	12.1	8.3	7.1	7.9	7.1	112.4
Average snowy days	3.9	2.9	1.0	0.1	0	0	0	0	0	0	0.4	1.4	9.7
Average relative humidity (%)	73	72	69	67	68	74	78	79	77	75	75	73	73
Mean monthly sunshine hours	129.9	128.1	156.6	180.0	189.5	149.5	173.1	184.4	164.2	168.4	146.5	141.8	1,912
Percentage possible sunshine	41	41	42	46	44	35	40	45	45	48	47	46	43
Source: China Meteorological Administration all-time extreme temperature all-time January high

== Transportation ==
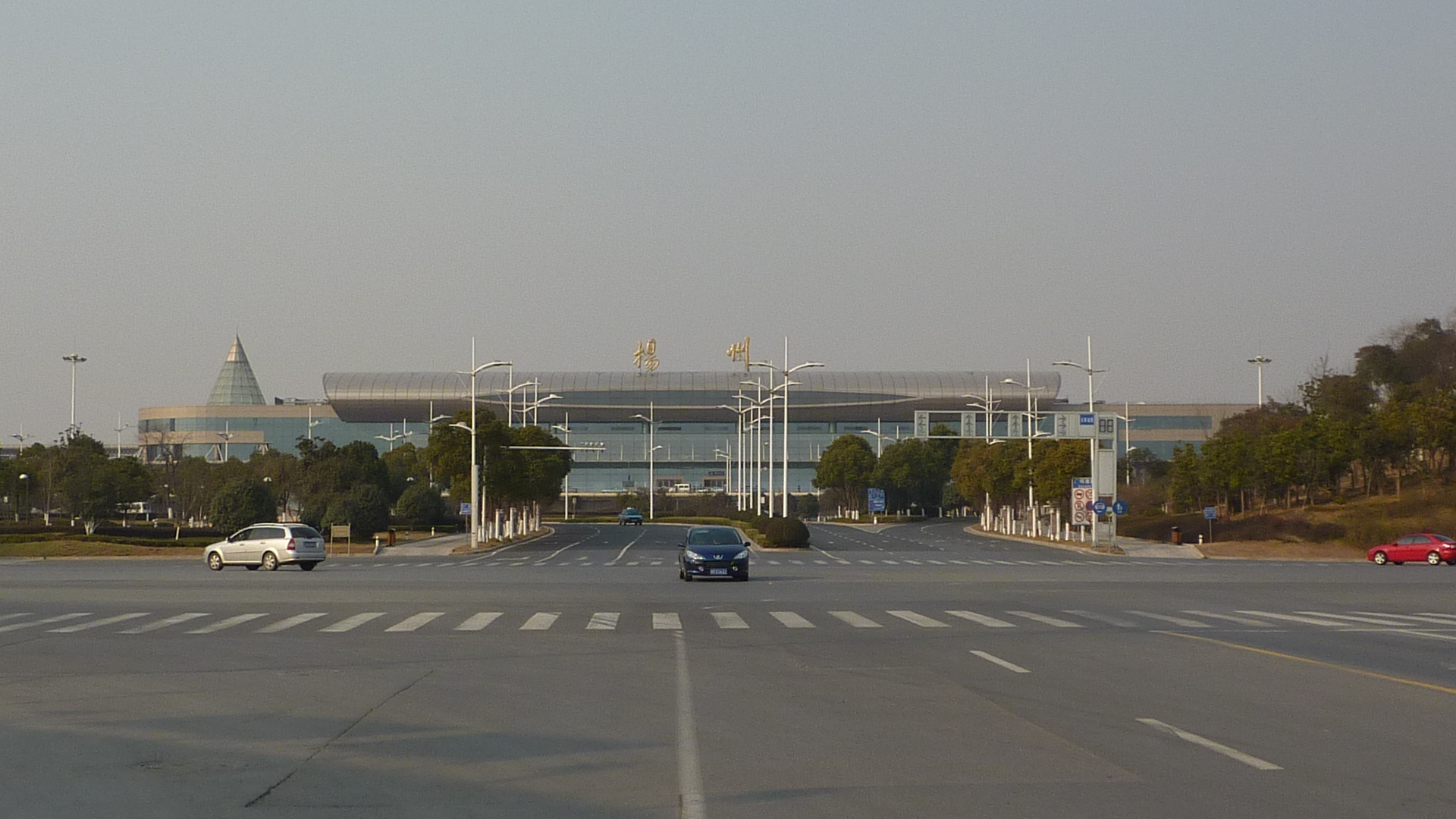
Yangzhou Railway Station

Yangzhou has one Yangtze River crossing, the Runyang Yangtze River Bridge complex, which has one of the longest suspension bridge spans in the world, and carries the G4011 Yangzhou–Liyang Expressway to Zhenjiang.

=== Air ===
The Yangzhou Taizhou International Airport, completed in 2012 to serve Yangzhou and neighboring Taizhou, is located in Jiangdu district. The Nanjing Lukou International Airport is over 100 km (62 mi) away; it takes one hour and 40 minutes to get there from central Yangzhou. Prior to the completion of the Yangzhou Taizhou Airport, Lukou Airport in Nanjing was the primary air gateway for passengers destined for Yangzhou. There are over 10 airline ticket offices in Yangzhou, providing convenient service for foreign and domestic tourists. domestic and international fight are available with 10 international airlines and more than 20 domestic ones

=== Rail ===
Until 2004, Yangzhou was not served by passenger rail. Yangzhou Railway Station began construction in 2003 and was completed a year later. It is located on the western outskirts of the city, and is a major station on the Nanjing–Qidong railway, and provides direct passenger service to the provincial capital as well as a number of major cities to the west, north, and south (such as Xi'an, Wuhan, and Guangzhou), including an overnight Z-series express train to Beijing. Later, frequent high-speed (D-series) service has been introduced on this line as well.

On 11 December 2020, Yangzhou East railway station entered service when the Lianyungang–Zhenjiang high-speed railway opened in full. The line, designed for speeds of 250 km/h (160 mph), connects southern and northern Jiangsu.

A new railway with a design speed of 350 km/h, Shanghai-Nanjing-Hefei High-Speed Railway, is also under construction. It is expected to run through the major existing railway station, Yangzhoudong Railway Station.

Major passenger railway stations in Yangzhou:

Station Name	Chinese	Location
Yangzhoudong	扬州东	Biodiverse and Sci-Tech City
Yangzhou	扬州	Hanjiang
Jiangdu	江都	Jiangdu
Gaoyou	高邮	Gaoyou
Gaoyoubei	高邮北	Gaoyou
Baoying	宝应	Baoying

=== River transport ===
Yangzhou harbor, 11.5 km (7.1 mi) south from the city center, is located at the junction of the Beijing–Hangzhou Canal and the Yangtze River. The average water depth is 15–20 meters. In 1992, the State Council approved it to become a first-grade open state harbor, and General Secretary Jiang Zemin inscribed its name. Now, it has developed into a comprehensive inland harbor, integrating passenger, freight, container transportation and harbor trade, and has become the main distribution center of northern Jiangsu province, eastern Anhui Province and southeast Shandong Province. There are several dozen categories of goods including iron and steel, timber, minerals, coal, grain, cotton, container, products of light industry and machinery. The passenger routes reach Nanjing, Wuhu, Jiujiang, Huangshi and Wuhan in the west, and Nantong and Shanghai in the east. Some well-known luxury international liners also anchor here. The harbor has greatly promoted the development of exports and the overall local economy.

=== Expressways ===
The G2 Beijing–Shanghai Expressway passes through Yangzhou. Its Yangzhou section was widened from four to eight lanes between March 2020 and June 2023. The expansion increased road capacity and improved connections from northern and central Jiangsu towards Shanghai and Zhejiang.

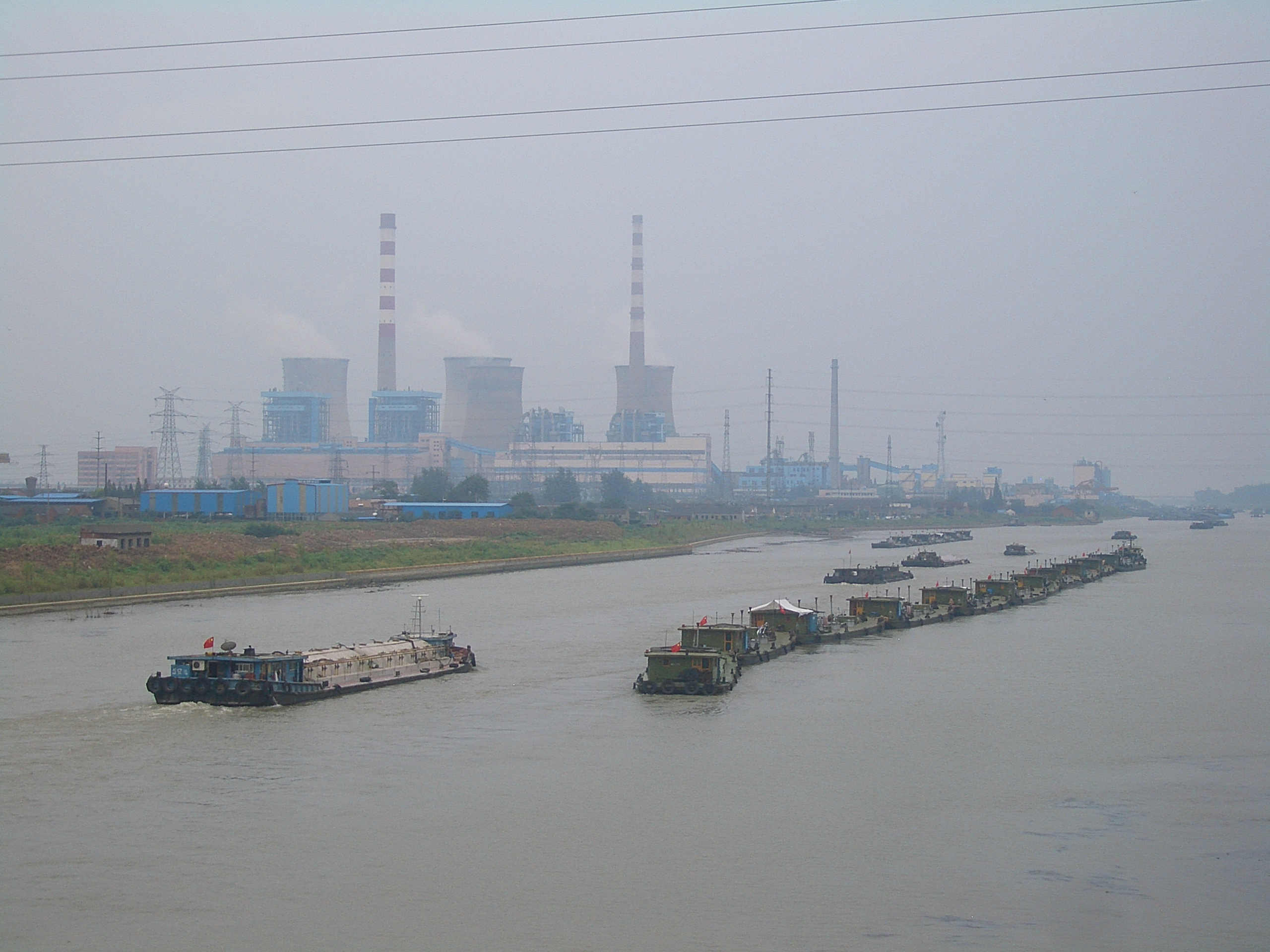
The modern route of the Grand Canal passes within a few kilometers east of the city's main urban area.

=== Intercity bus service ===
During the daytime, frequent bus service operates between Yangzhou and nearby cities. There are several bus stations on the city's outskirts; most of the buses from Nanjing (Nanjing West Bus Station) and Zhenjiang (where the bus station is adjacent to the Zhenjiang Railway Station) arrive to Yangzhou South Bus Station, located a few kilometers southwest from downtown. Most of the intercity bus service stops in the early evening.

=== Transportation in the urban area ===
The city is served by an extensive network of public bus routes.

Yangzhou's taxi industry began in 1982, and has developed rapidly since 1993. the city has over 40 taxi companies of various ownership structures, with a total of 1,571 vehicles. Parking lots were established at key stations and hotels, and eight taxi companies have opened round-the-clock telephone service. The construction department of the municipal government has strengthened the management of taxi services, providing education in the relevant laws, professional ethics and safety aspects.

A 2014 municipal plan proposed two urban rail lines. Line 1 was planned to run east–west from Yangzhou Railway Station through the historic city centre and what is now Yangzhou East railway station to Jiangdu District, while Line 2 was planned to run north–south.

The Nanjing–Yizheng–Yangzhou intercity railway (Nanjing Metro Line S5) is under construction between Nanjing and Yangzhou. As of June 2026, the first elevated section in Nanjing had been completed and two stations on the line had topped out.

=== Tourist transportation ===
To develop tourism in Yangzhou, sightseeing buses have been introduced in the city run by the Tianma travel agency under the Yangzhou Tourist Bureau. There is a tour guide on each bus. The route, starting from Yangzhou station, has eight stops, and passes by such scenic spots of the Slender West Lake, Daming Temple, Imperial Dock, Siwang Pagoda, Wenchang Pagoda, and Shita Temple. Yangzhou Public Transit also operates No. 1, No. 2, and No. 5 special tourist lines. The No. 1 bus departs from the bus station and goes by the Slender West Lake, Shigong Temple, Ge Garden, and He Garden; the No. 5 bus starts from the bus station and goes by the Crane Temple, Wenchang Pagoda, Slender West Lake, Five-Pavilion Bridge, and Pingshan Hall. A sight-seeing route on Slender West Lake has opened, connecting Imperial Dock, Yichun Garden, Hong Garden, Dahong Bridge, Xiaojinshan, Diaoyutai, Five-Pavilion Bridge, and the 24 Bridge, finally reaching Daming Temple and Pingshan Hall.

== Industries and shipyards ==
Yangzhou is the site of Chengxi shipyard, large shipyard where bulk carriers and other types of large ships are built. Owned partly by the state owned CSSC holdings, through Jiangsu Xinrong shipyard, Chengxi Yangzhou shipyard builds ships from 25,000 dwt to 170,000 dwt in size.

== Culture ==
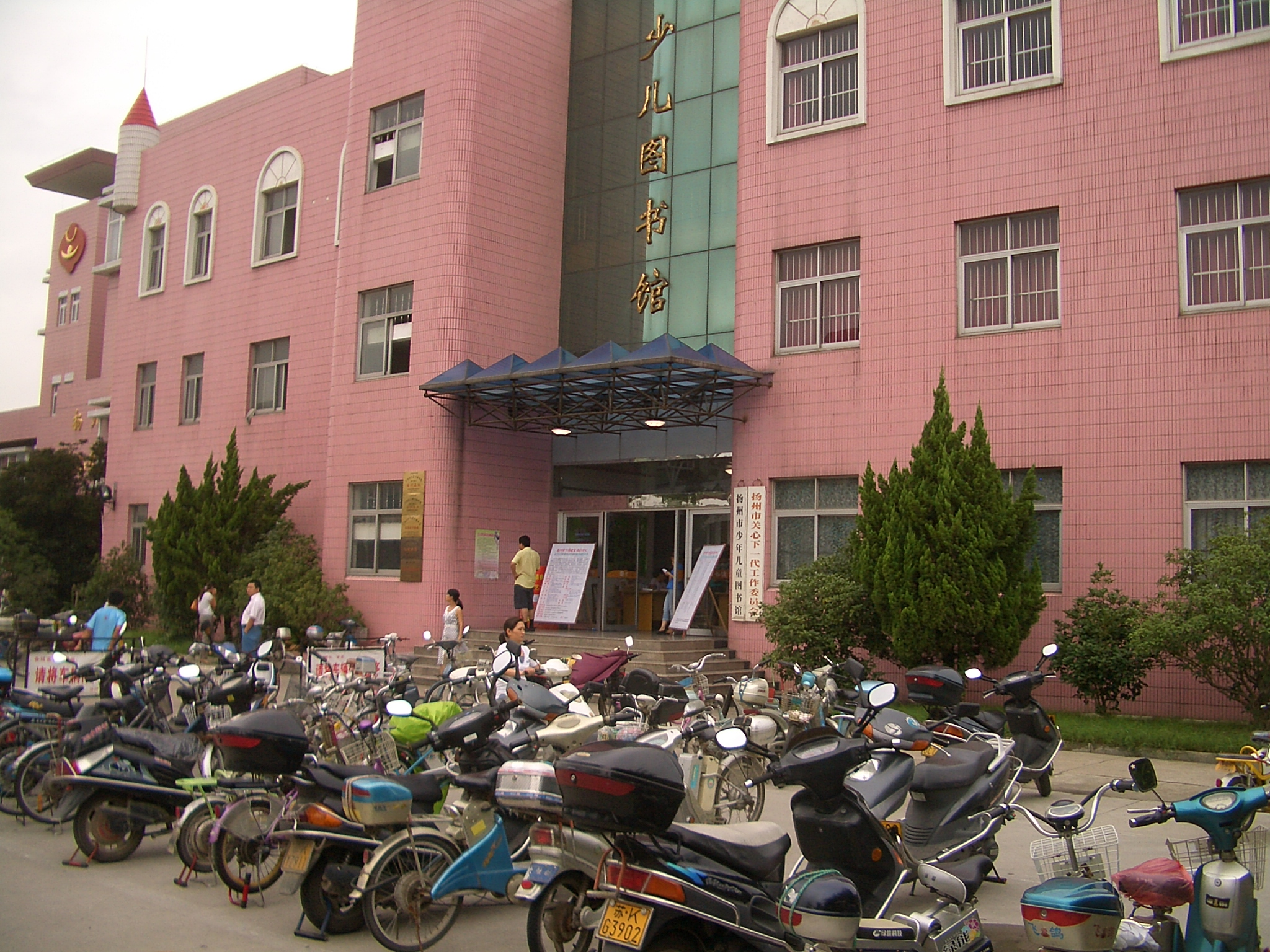
Children's Library building, on the premises of Yangzhou Public Library

The Yangzhou dialect (Chinese: 扬州话, /iaŋ ʦɤɯ xua/) of Chinese is representative of Lower Yangtze Mandarin, and is particularly close to the official language of the Ming and Qing courts, which was based on the Nanjing dialect. However, it does differ considerably from modern Standard Chinese, although they are still moderately mutually intelligible.

Dialect has also been used as a tool for regional identity and politics in the Jiangbei and Jiangnan regions. While the city of Yangzhou was a prosperous center of trade, it was considered part of Jiangnan, which was known to be wealthy, even though Yangzhou was north of the Yangzi river. Once Yangzhou's wealth and prosperity were gone, it was then considered to be part of Jiangbei, the "backwater".

During a period of prosperity and imperial favor, the arts of storytelling and painting flourished in Yangzhou. The innovative painter-calligrapher Shitao lived in Yangzhou during the 1680s and again from 1697 until his death in 1707. A later group of painters from that time called the Eight Eccentrics of Yangzhou are famous throughout China.

Former General secretary of CPC, President of China Jiang Zemin was born and raised in Yangzhou. His middle school is located right across from the public notary's office in Yangzhou.

Yangzhou is famous for its carved lacquerware and jade.

Some of China's creative and eye catching dishes come from the Yangzhou school of cuisine called Huaiyang (also commonly known as the Weiyang school). Along with Sichuan cuisine, Cantonese cuisine, and Shandong cuisine, Huaiyang cuisine (淮扬菜) is a distinctive skill.

The city is famous for its public bath houses, lacquerware, jadeware, embroidery, and paper-cut arts and crafts.

The city was awarded Habitat Scroll of Honor in 2006.

Yangzhou is also very famous for its toy industry (especially stuffed animals). Many tourists from neighboring cities travel to the city for its good-quality and low-priced toys.

The city is also famous for an ancient folk art called Yangzhou storytelling (扬州评话), which is like Xiangsheng—the traditional Chinese comedic performance. It rose as a performing act during the Ming dynasty. In the performance, the artist details a historical story to audiences, using Yangzhou dialect. These stories have been edited by artists. The best known artist of Yangzhou storytelling was Wang shaotang. His most famous works are The 10 chapters of Wu Song (武十回), The 10 chapters of Song Jiang (宋十回), The 10 chapters of Lu Junyi (卢十回), and The 10 chapters of Shi Xiu (石十回).

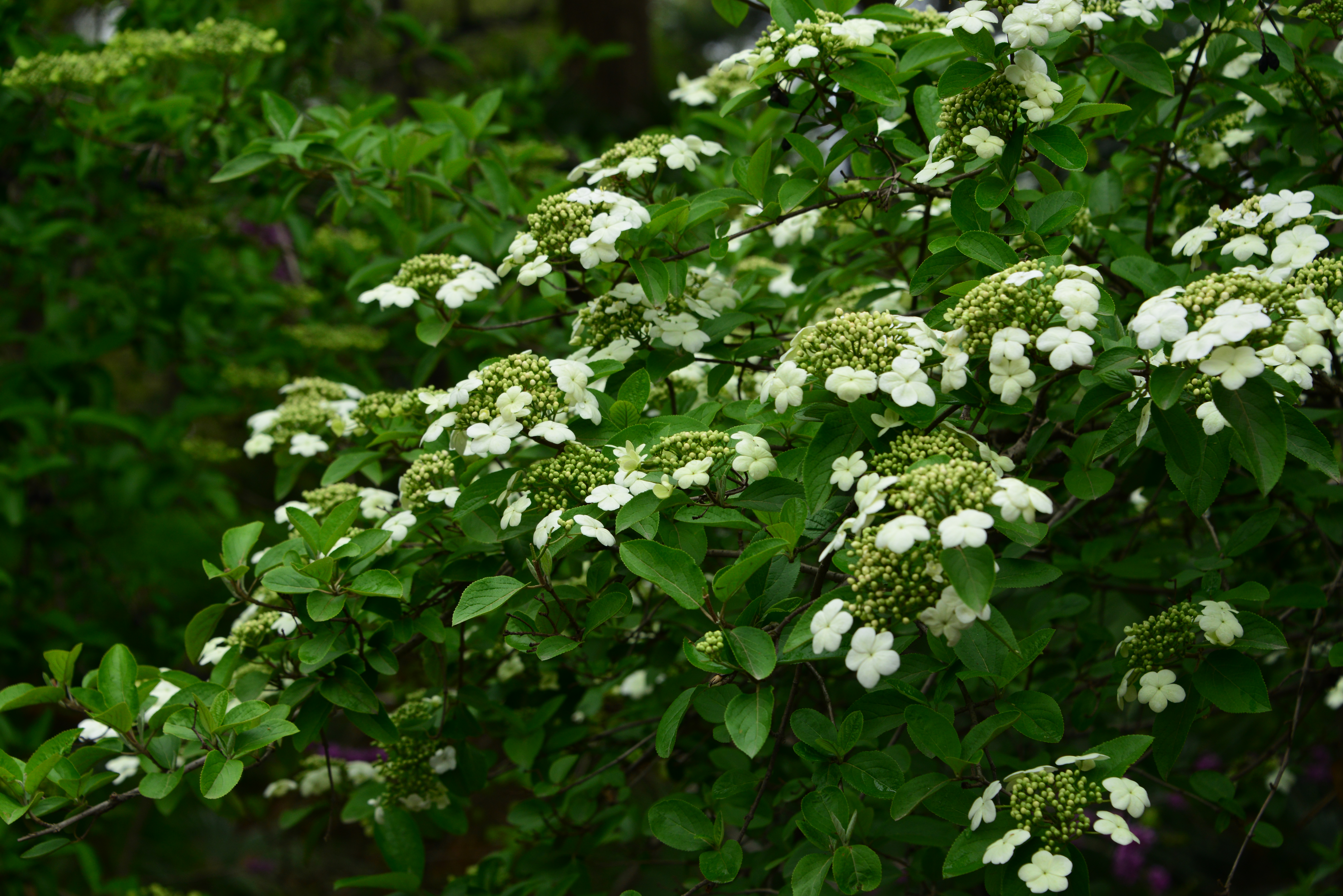
Chinese snowball flowers

=== Literary references ===
Yangzhou was frequently referenced in Chinese literature. Poet Li Bai (c. 700–762) wrote in Seeing Meng Haoran off to Yangzhou from Yellow Crane Pavilion:

At Yellow Crane Pavilion in the west
My old friend says farewell;
In the mist and flowers of spring
He goes down to Yangzhou;
Lonely sail, distant shadow,
Vanish in blue emptiness;
All I see is the great river
Flowing into the far horizon.

Du Mu wrote the famous lines on Yangzhou:

After ten years, I awoke from my Yangzhou dream,
All I gained was a fickle reputation in the green mansions.

The "green mansions" or "green/black lofts" (qinglou) refers to the pleasure districts for which Yangzhou became known.

In the Qing dynasty novel Dream of the Red Chamber, the character of Lin Daiyu is from Yangzhou.

== Tourism ==
Tourist sights include Slender West Lake and old residences in the moated town, such as the Wang Residence and the Daming temple. Yangzhou is famous for its many well preserved Yangzhou style gardens. Most of the Historic city is in the Guangling District. As of June 2024, Yangzhou had 24 national-level, 50 provincial-level, and 454 city- and county-level heritage buildings.

=== Slender West Lake ===
Named after Hangzhou's famous West Lake, this long, narrow stretch of water which meanders through Yangzhou's western limits is a well-known scenic spot. Yangzhou's Slender West Lake (Shou Xihu) is a UNESCO World Heritage site, and the Geyuan Garden (个园) is renowned for its bamboo and rockeries representing the four seasons. A long bank planted with weeping willows spans the lake. At its midpoint stands the Five-Pavilion Bridge with five covered terraces, one at each of the corners and one in the center. Around the lake is a park in which are found several attractions: Xu Garden, the White Dagoba of Lianxing Temple, copied from the similar tower in Beijing's Beihai Park; Small Gold Mountain (Xiao Jinshan); and the Fishing Platform (Diaoyutai), a favorite retreat of the Qing emperor Qian Long. The emperor was so gratified by his luck in fishing at this spot that he ordered additional stipends for the town. As it turns out, his success had been augmented by local swimmers who lurked in the lake busily attaching fish to his hook.

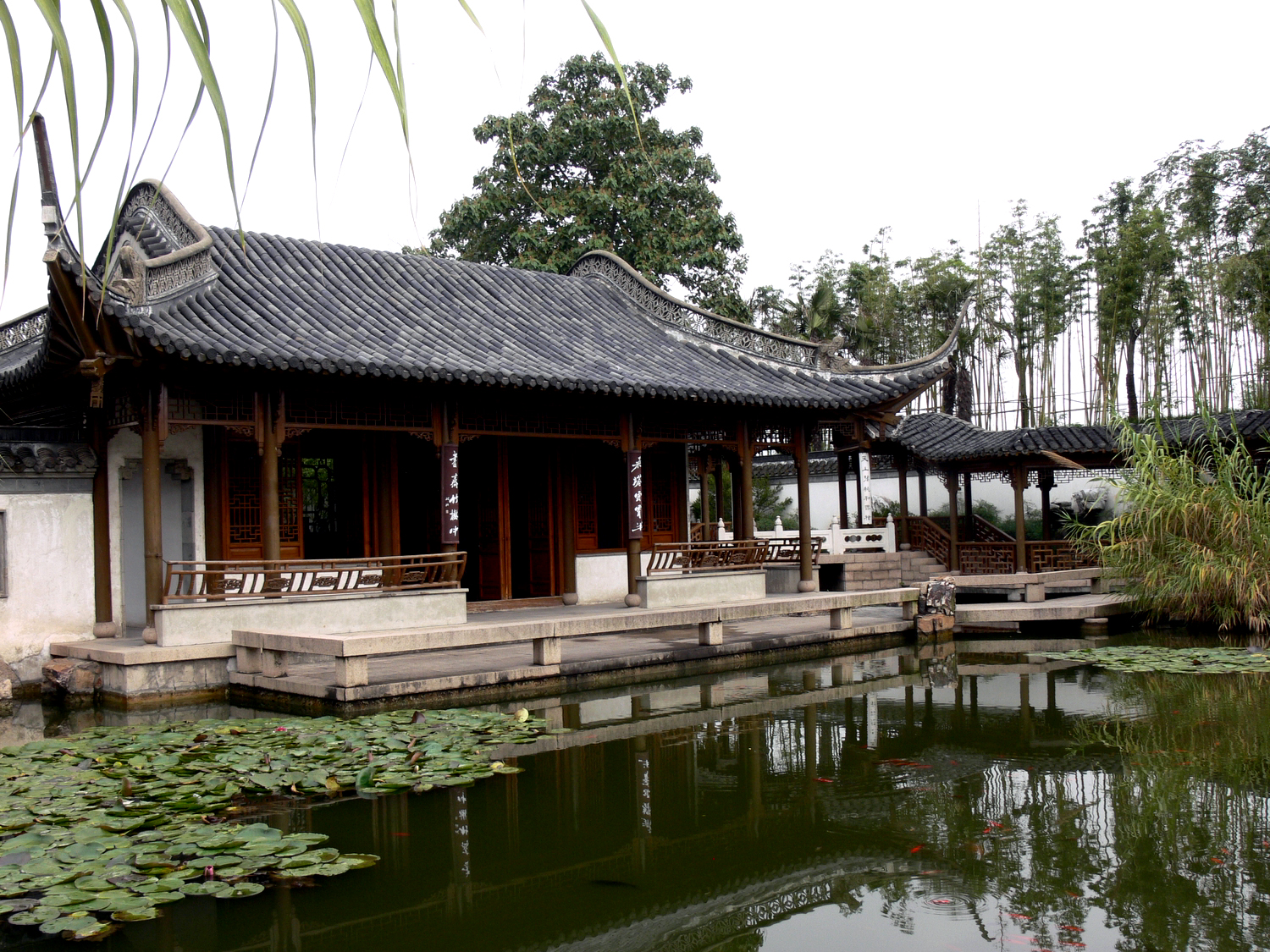
Study hall

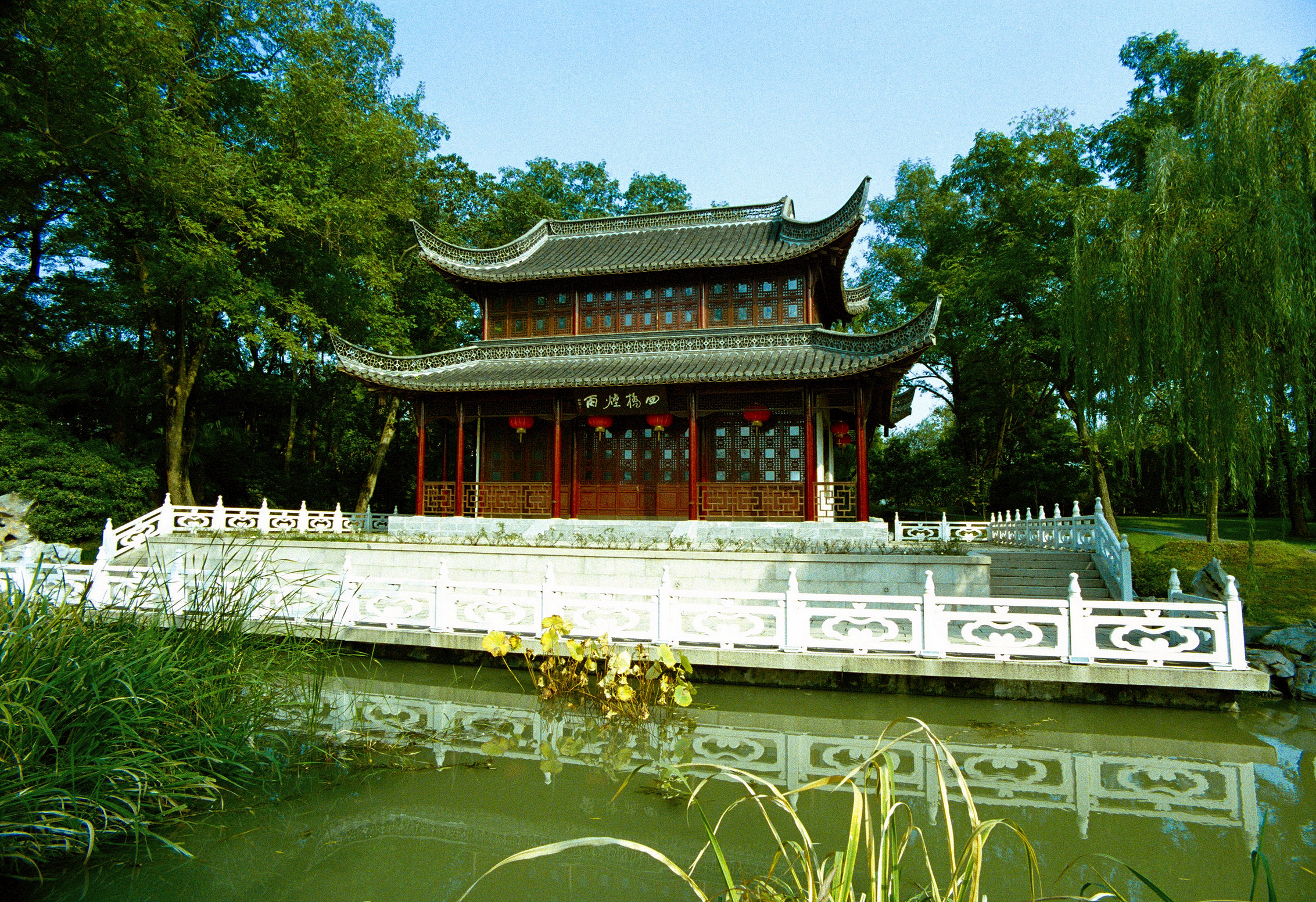
Four Bridges in Rain and Mist

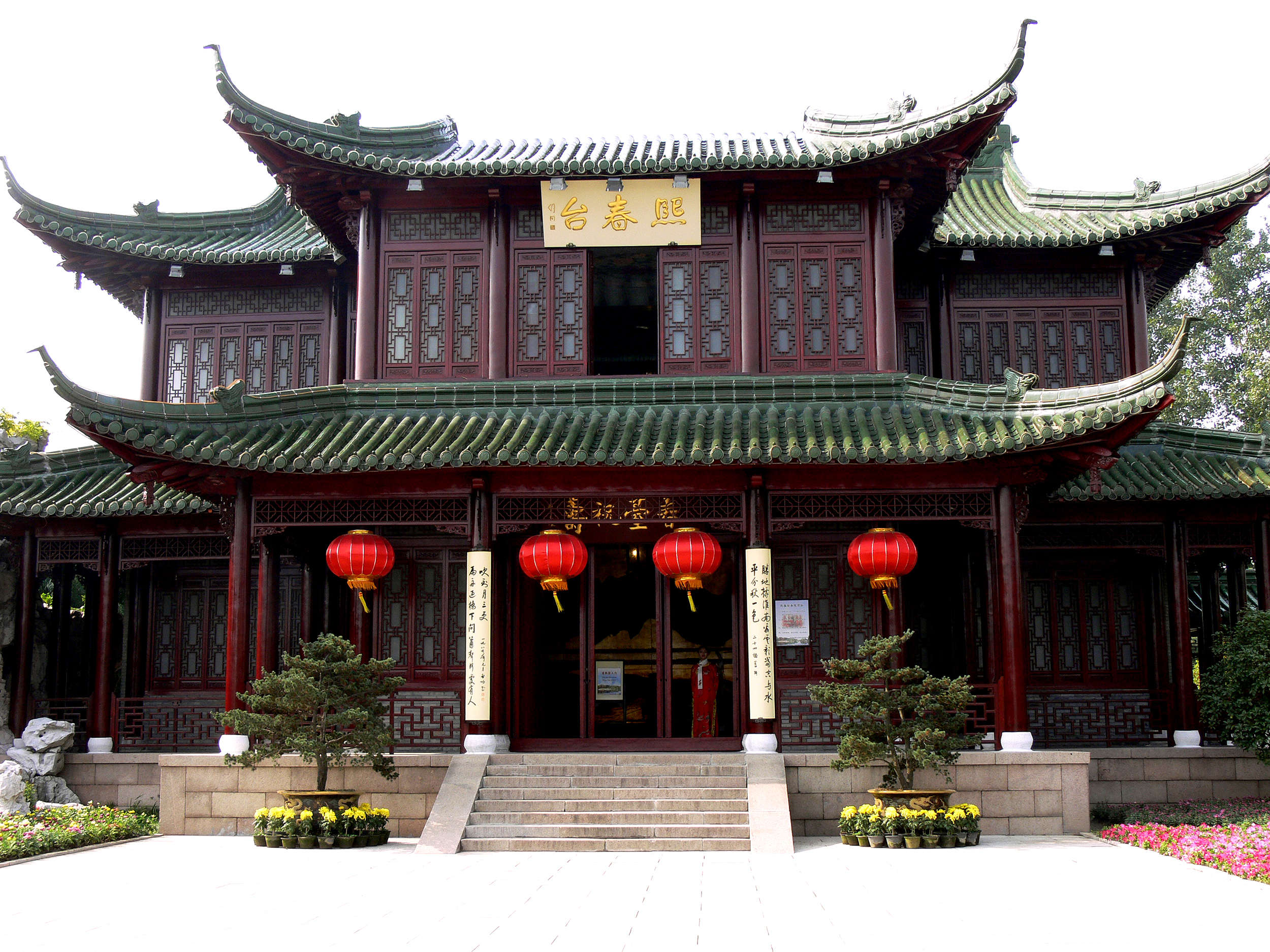
Imperial birthday celebration stage

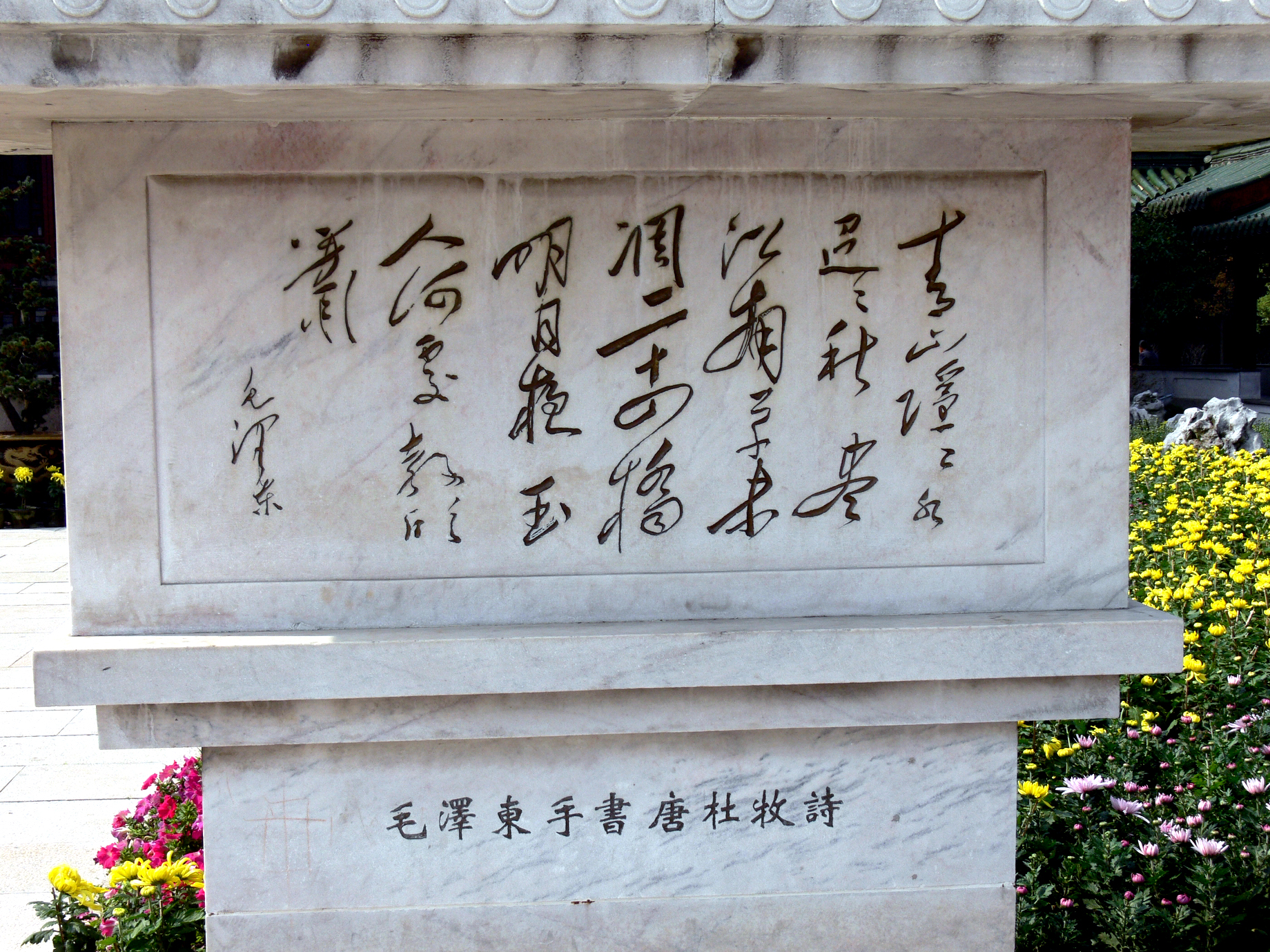
Mao Zedong's calligraphy of the Tang dynasty poet Du Mu poem

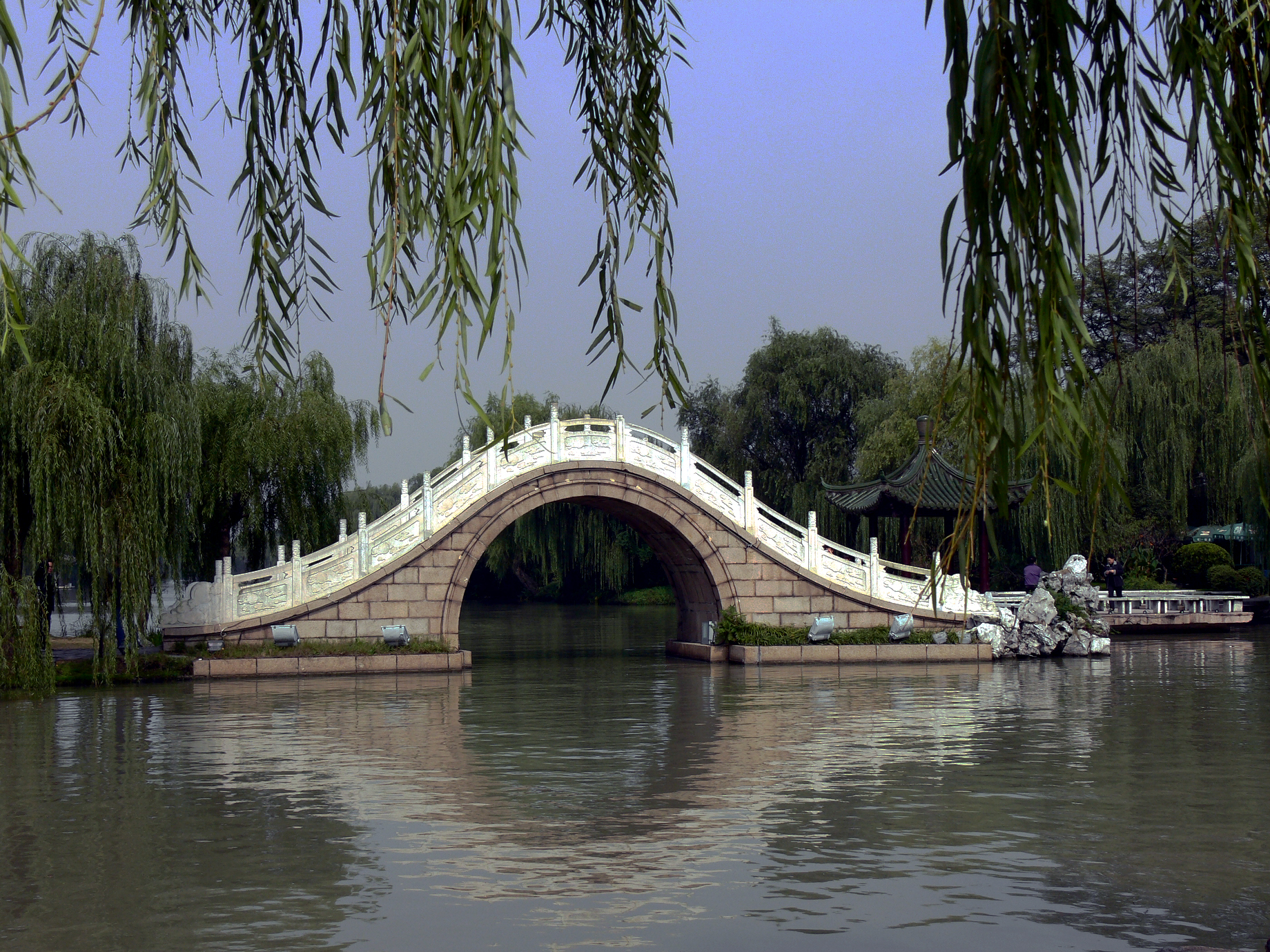
24 ancient beauties played flute on this bridge

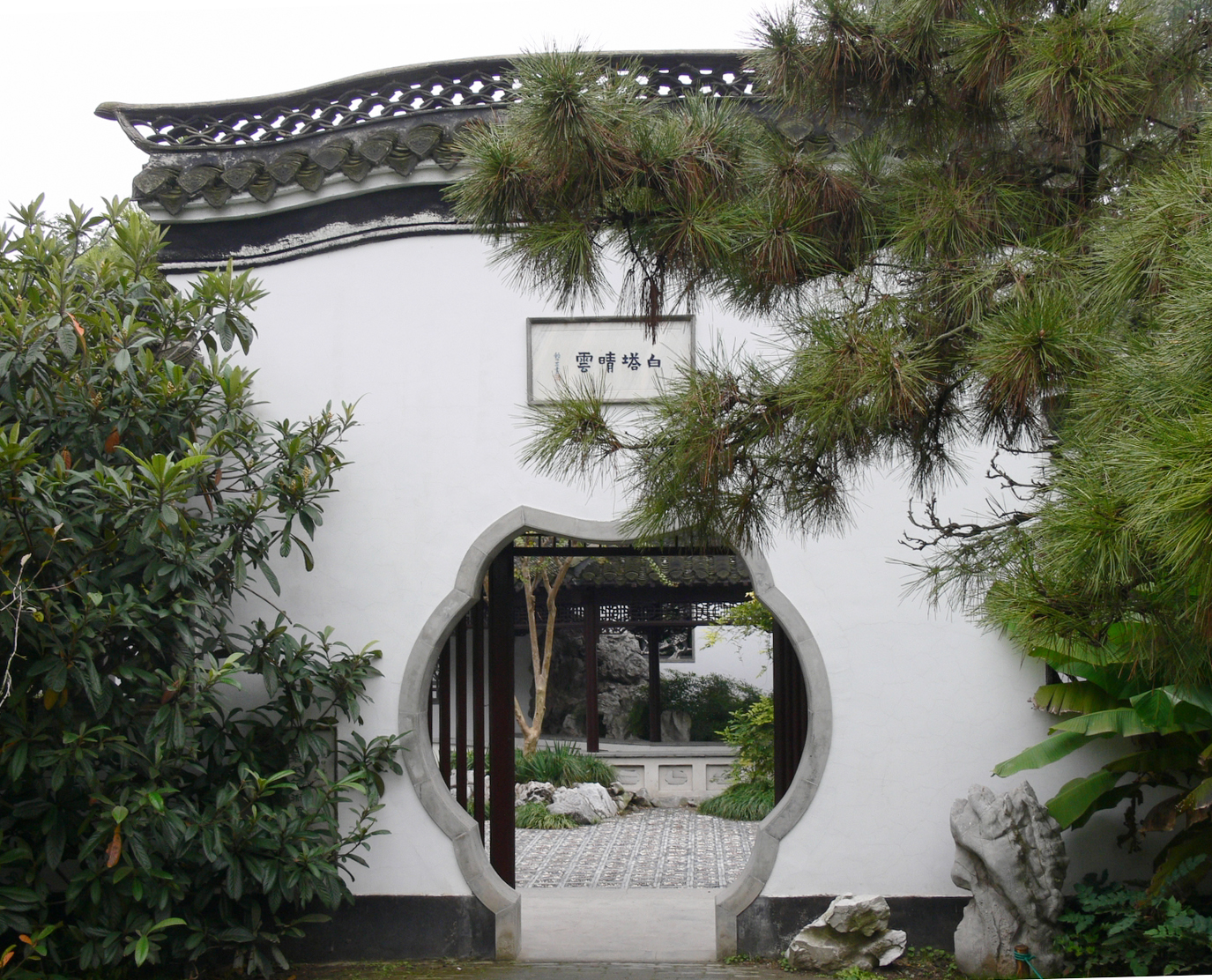
White Dagoba against Oncoming Clouds, part of Lianxing Temple

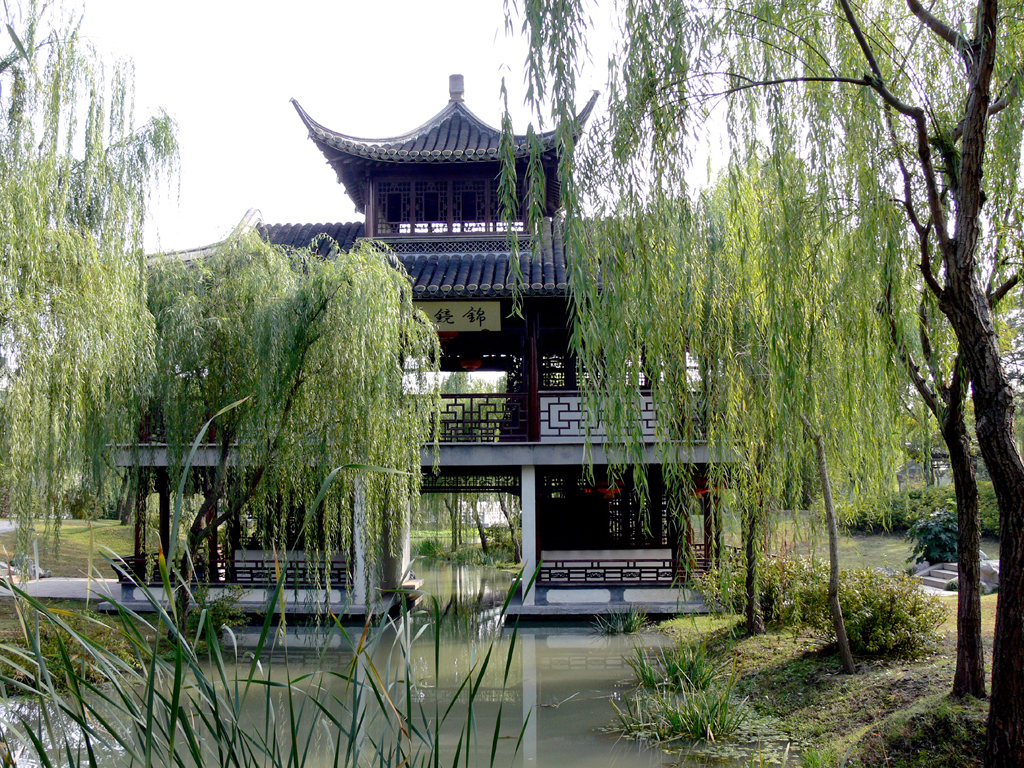
The Jinjingge bridge

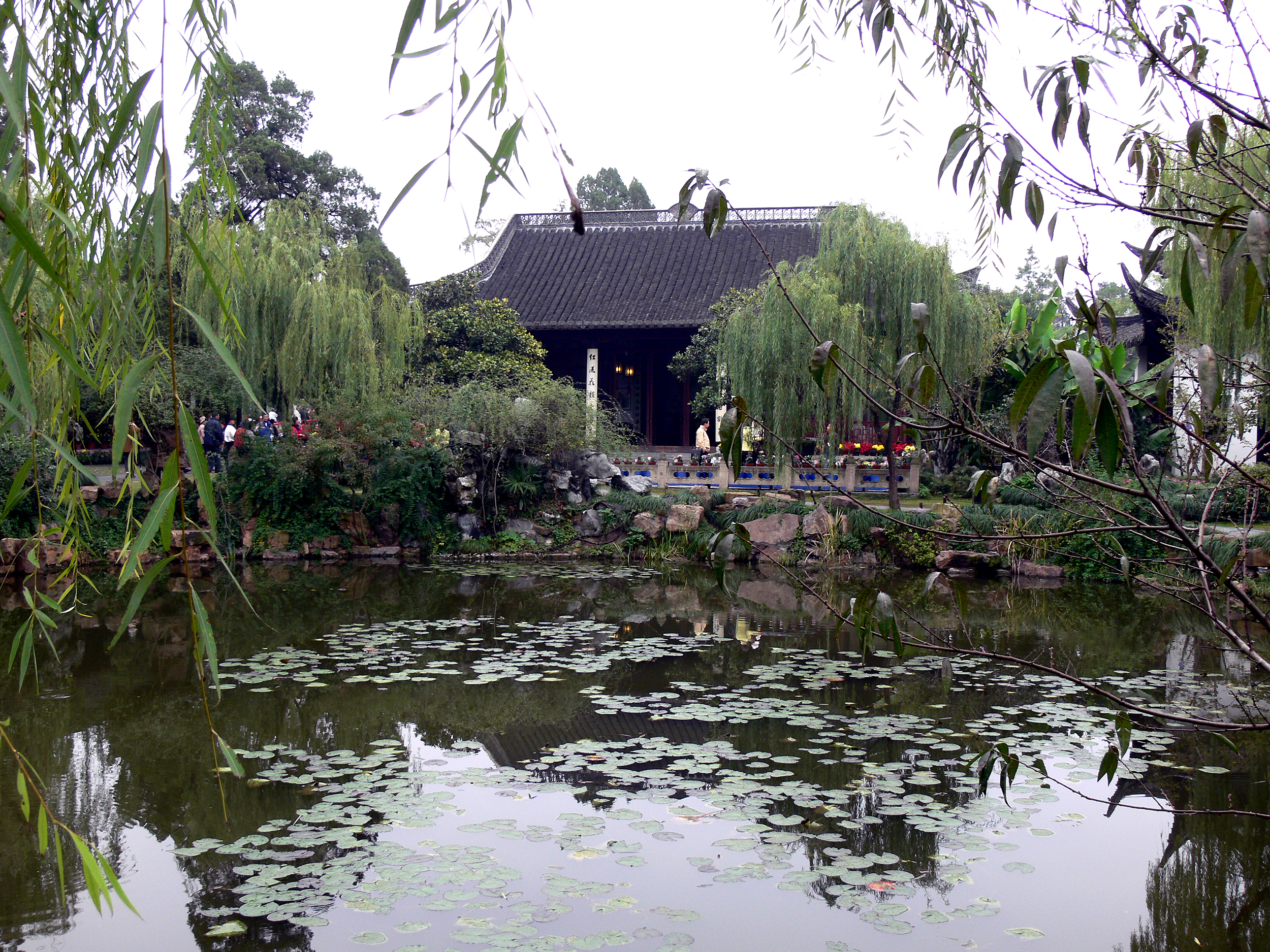
Xu Garden

=== Daming Temple ===
Located on Shugang Hill, in the city's northwest, is Fajing Temple, formerly known as DaMing Temple. The original temple was built in Liu Song dynasty (420–479). A nine-story pagoda, the Qilingta, was built on the temple grounds in the year of Sui dynasty (589–618) . A recent addition to the temple complex is the Jianzhen Memorial Hall, built according to Tang dynasty methods and financed with contributions raised by Buddhist groups in Japan. When Qing Emperor Qian Long visited Yangzhou in 1765, he was troubled by The temple's name DaMing (which literally means "Great Ming') fearing that it might revive nostalgia for the Ming dynasty, which was overthrown by his Manchu predecessors. He had it renamed Fajing Temple. The temple was seriously damaged during the Taiping Rebellion at the beginning of the 20th century. The present structure is a reconstruction dating from the 1930s.

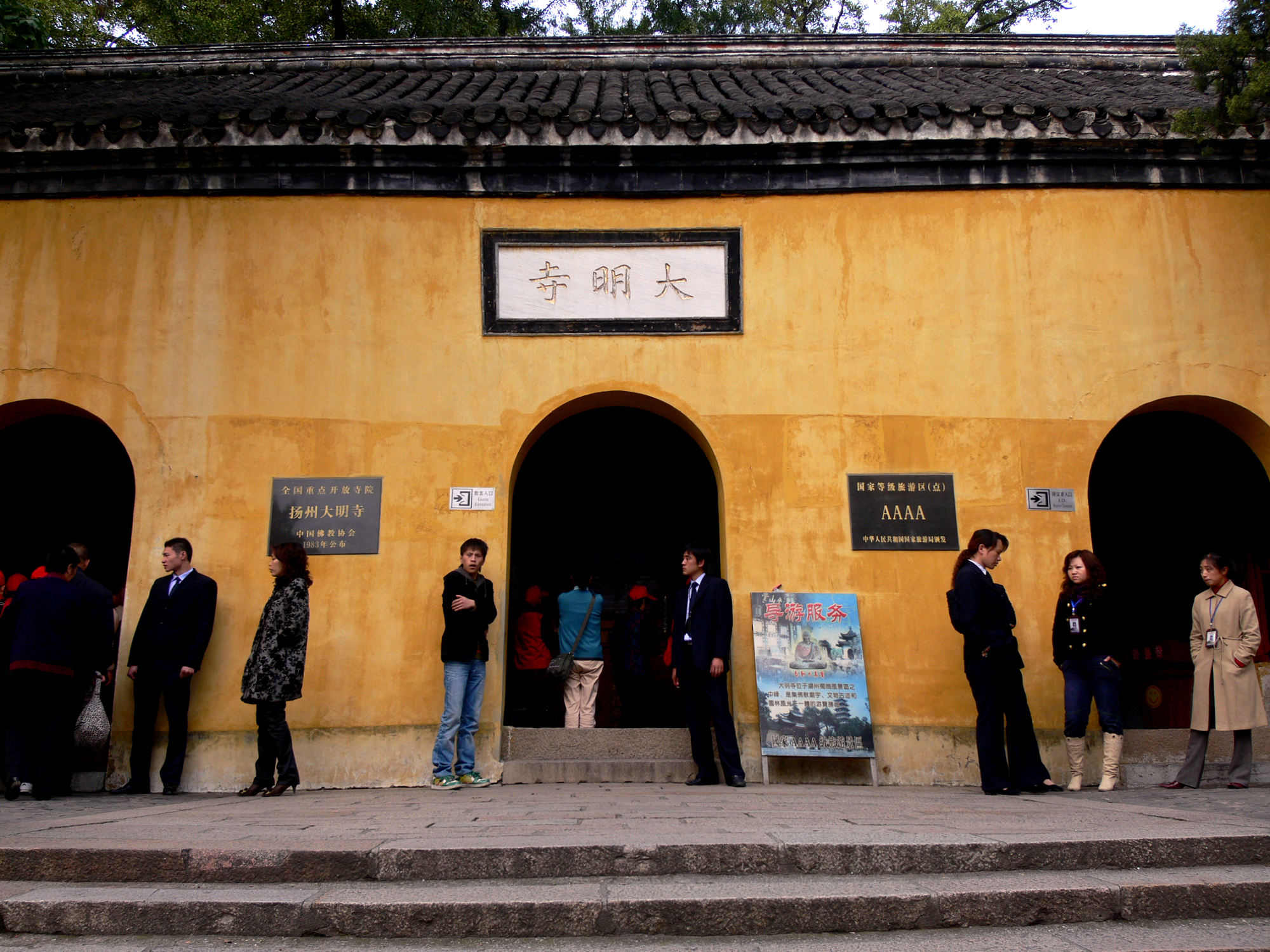
Da Ming Temple

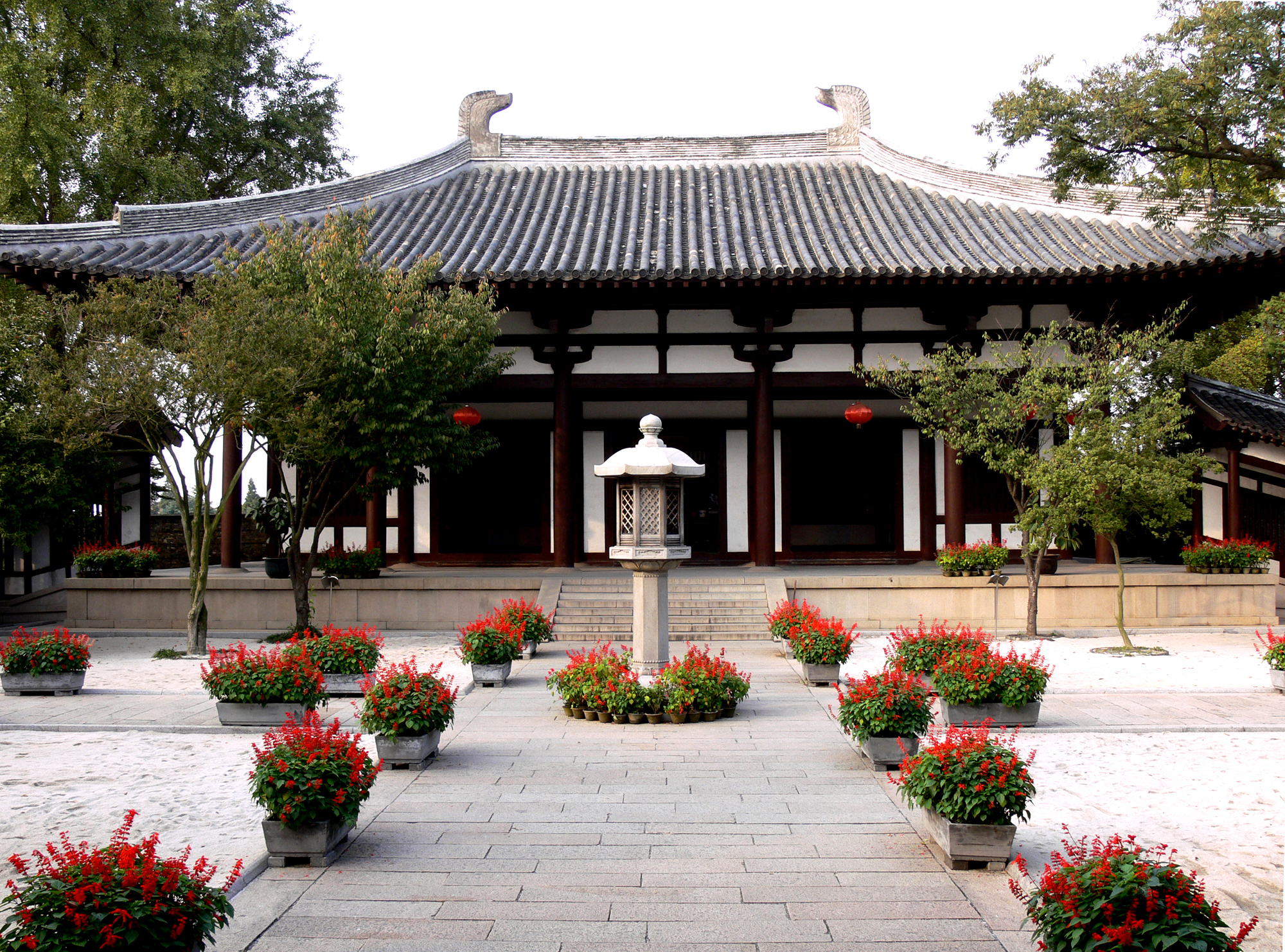
Memorial Hall of monk Jianzhen

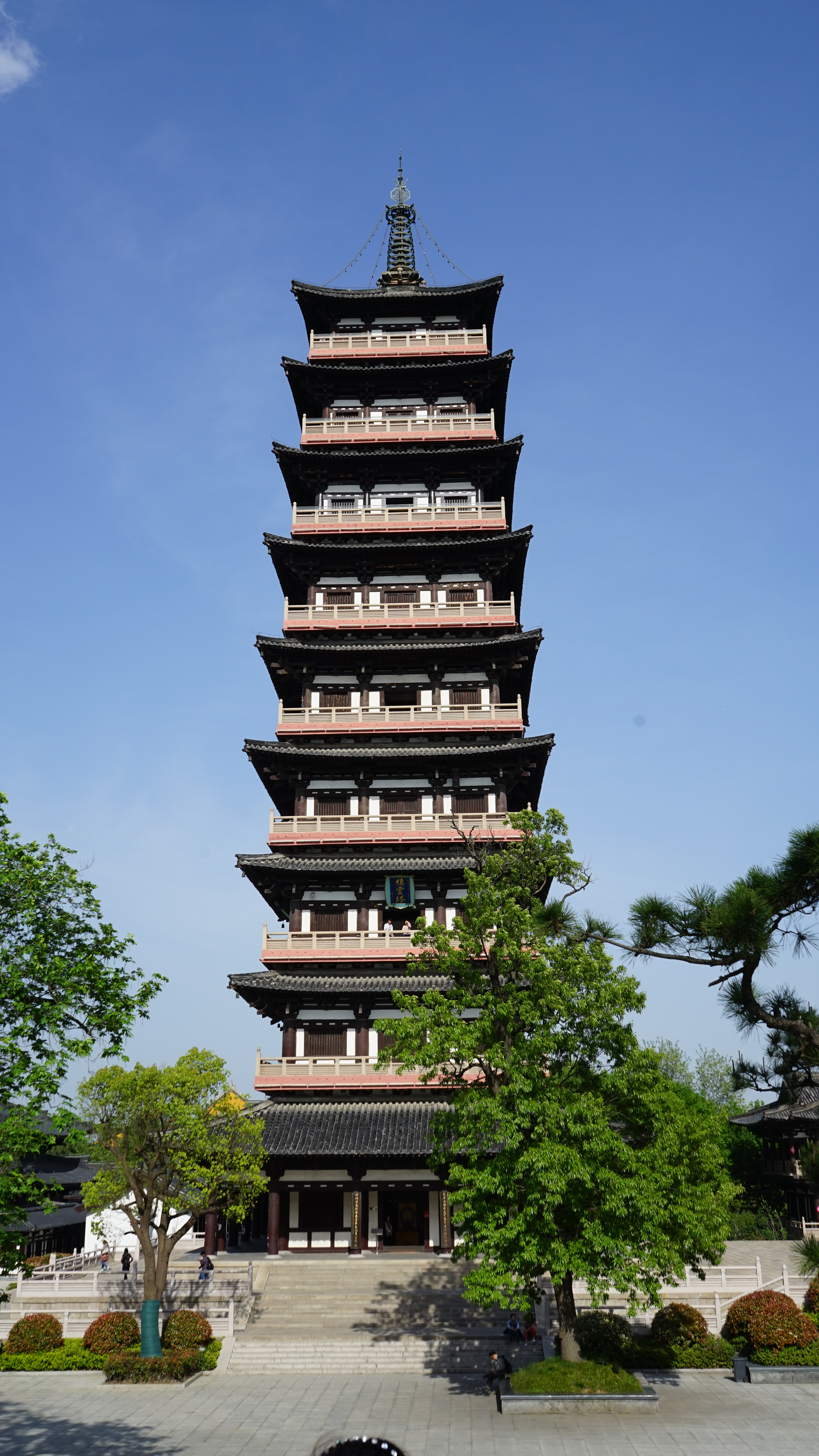
Da Ming temple pagoda

=== Flat Hills (Ping Shan) Hall ===
Built by the Song dynasty writer Ouyang Xiu when he served as prefect of the city, this hall stands just west of Fajing Temple. Looking out from this hall, the mountains to the south of the Yangtze River appear as a line at the viewer's eye level, hence the name Flat Hills Hall. When Ouyang Xiu's student Su Dongpo moved to Yangzhou, he too served as prefect of the city. He had a hall built directly behind the one erected by his master, and called it Guling Hall.

=== Pavilion of Flourishing Culture ===
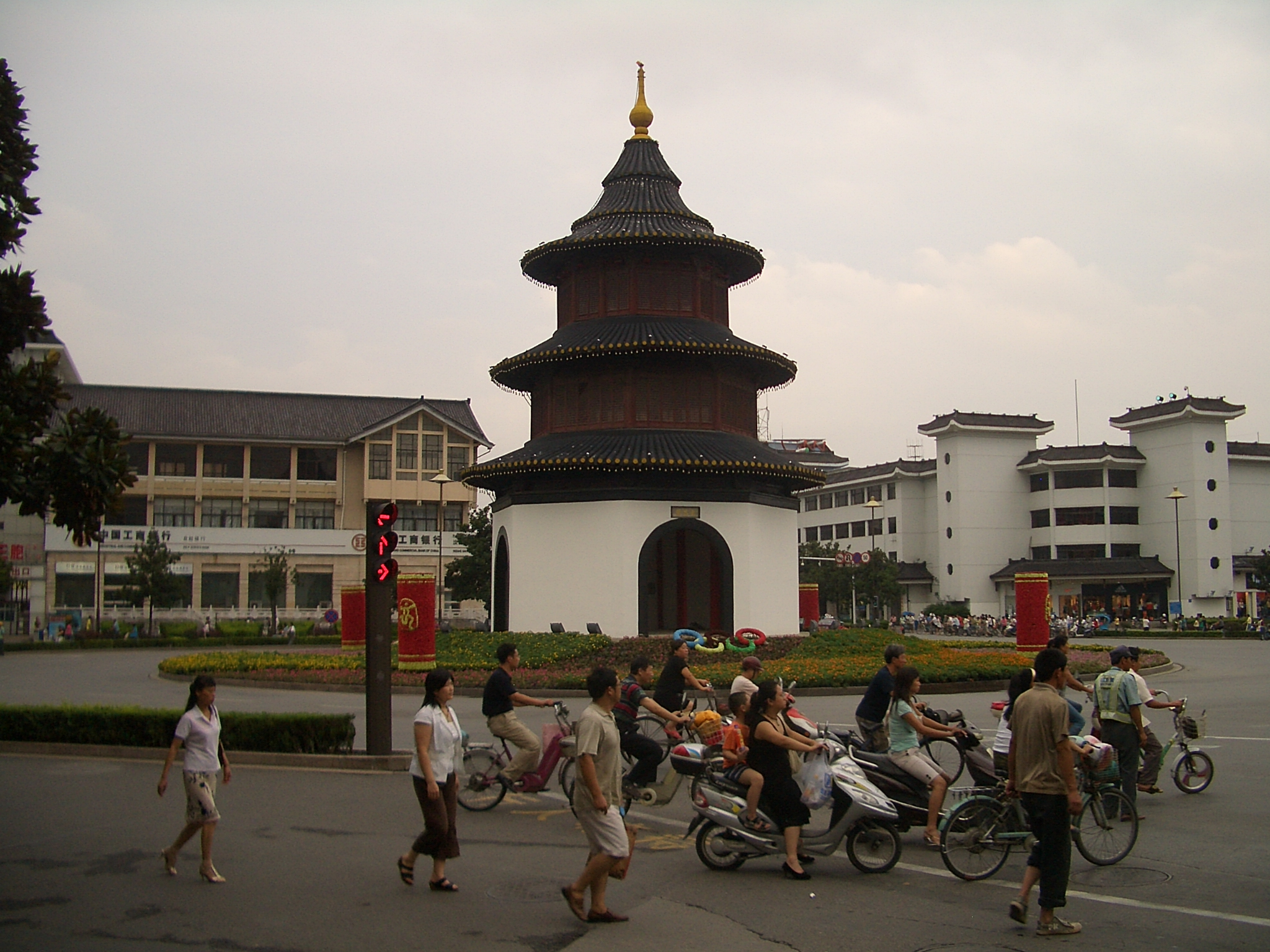
Wenchang Ge

The Pavilion of Flourishing Culture (t 文昌閣, s 文昌阁, Wénchāng Gé) is a round, three-story pavilion in Yangzhou's eastern sector, built in 1585 and celebrating the city's rich cultural traditions. It is also the de facto center of the city.

Built during Ming dynasty, it is located on the cross of Wenchang Road and Wenhe Road. The whole building is about 79-foot high, and looks like Temple of Heaven in Beijing. Today, bordered by many shopping stores, Wenchange had been a symbol of commercial center to residents.

=== Stone Pagoda ===
The Stone Pagoda (石塔, Shítǎ) is a five-story Tang-era pagoda west of the Pavilion of Flourishing Culture. First built in 837, it is the oldest pagoda still standing in Yangzhou.

=== Tomb of Puhaddin ===
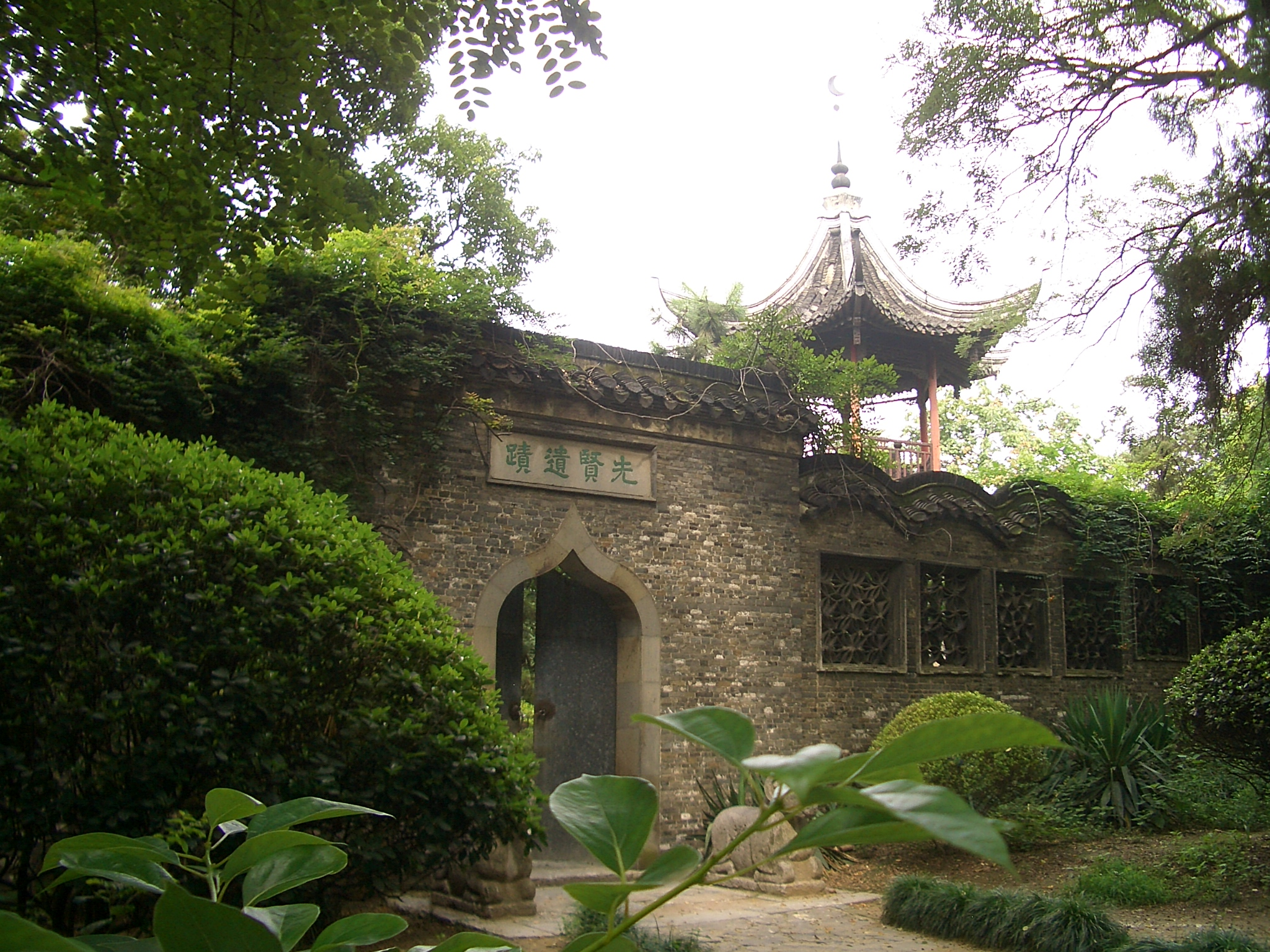
The mosque complex at the tomb of Puhaddin

This is essentially a Ming dynasty graveyard that includes the tomb of Puhaddin. According to information at the tomb, he was a 16th generation descendant of Muhammad, the prophet. The tomb is on the eastern bank of the (Old) Grand Canal in the eastern sector of the city and is adjacent to a mosque which houses a collection of valuable materials documenting China's relations with Muslim countries.

=== Ge Garden ===
Ge Garden or Geyuan is a Jiangnan estate and garden, reckoned among the most refined and beautiful in China. Erected off Dongguan Road over a previous estate, the present design was established and named by the prosperous salt merchant Huang Zhiyun, who named it in honor of the virtues of the bamboo that appear in his name and throughout the garden. It is particularly famed for its four rockeries intended to represent the seasons.

=== He Garden ===
He Garden or Heyuan, also known as the Jixiao Shanzhuang, was built by the 19th-century Qing official He Zhidao. The garden is famed for its winding 430 m (1,410 ft) 2 story corridor, the walls of which are lined with stone tablets carved with lines of classical poetry. The garden also has an open-air theater set on an island in the middle of a fish pond.

=== Yechun Garden ===
Yechun Garden or Yechunyuan lies on the banks of the Xiading River at the city's northern limits. Under the Qing, the poet Wang Yuyang and his circle of friends used to gather in the garden to recite their works. The thatched roofs of the pavilions in this garden give it a quaint rustic air.

=== Yangzhou Museum ===
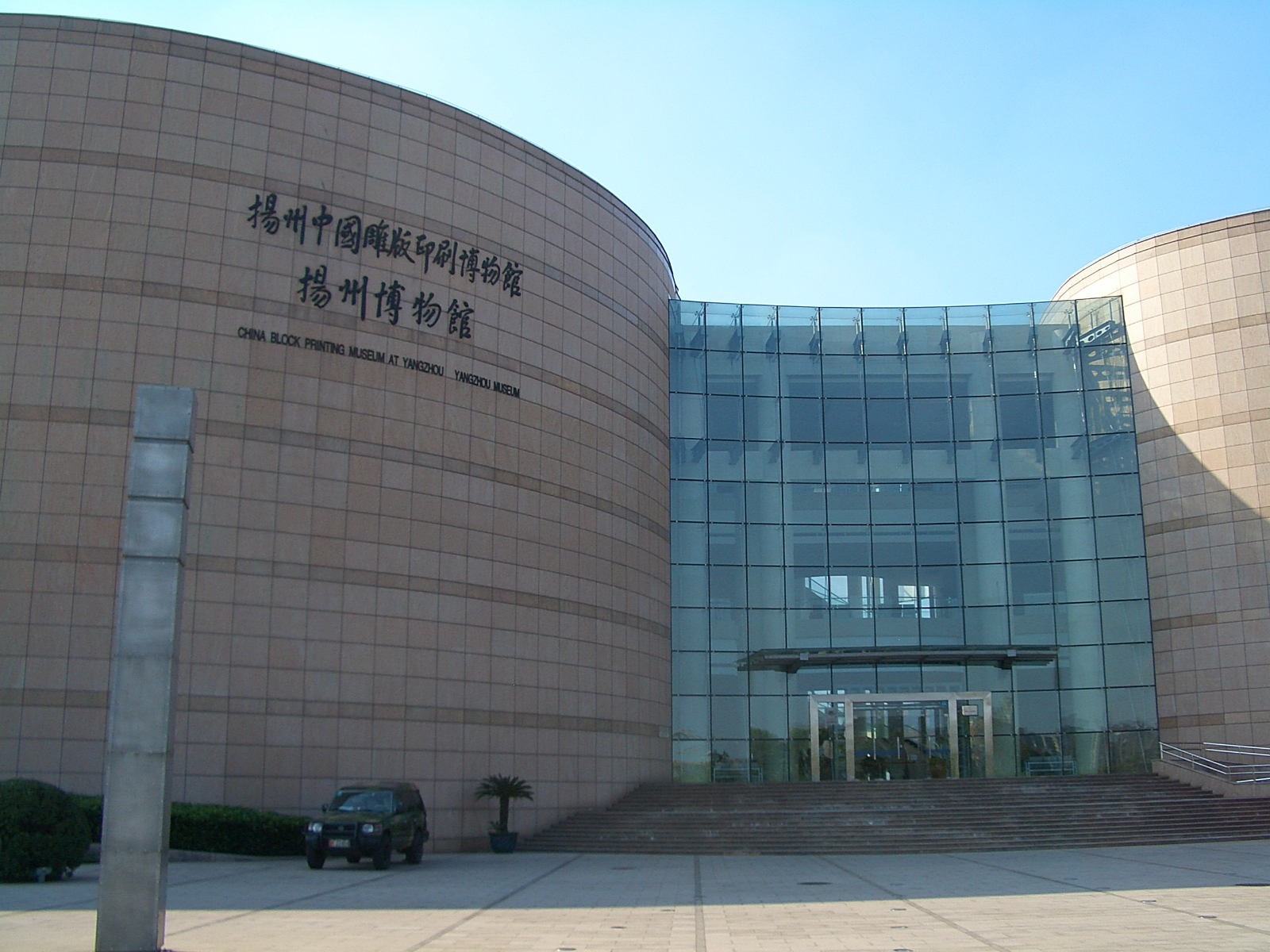
Yangzhou Museum / China Block Printing Museum

The Yangzhou Museum is on the west shore of Bright Moon Lake, its architecture intended to embody the harmony of man and nature. The museum proper—covering the history of Yangzhou and the surrounding areas of China—occupies only a portion of the third floor, the other floors technically organized and operated as separate museums including the Chinese Block Printing Museum (扬州中国雕版印刷博物馆) established by the State Council in August 2003 to house 300,000 printing blocks collected by Yangzhou's Guangling Press. All together, the museums cover an area of 50,000 square meters (540,000 sq ft) with the exhibition area occupying a fifth of the total.

=== Jiangdu Hydro Project ===
The Jiangdu Hydro Project is the southern beginning of the eastern route of the South–North Water Transfer Project, intended to divert massive amounts of freshwater from the mouth of the Yangtze to China's drier northern regions along the route of the Grand Canal. Construction of the pumping facilities involved began in 1961 and was completed in 1975. The project includes facilities for irrigation, drainage, navigation, and power generation including 4 large electric pumping stations, 6 medium-sized check gates, 3 navigation locks, and 2 trunk waterways.

== Education ==
As of 2024, Yangzhou is a major city for scientific research outputs, appearing among the world's top 200 cities as tracked by the Nature Index.

=== Universities and colleges ===
- Yangzhou University
- Yangzhou Polytechnic College
- Yangzhou Polytechnic Institute
- Yangzhou Medical University

=== Primary and secondary education ===
- Yangzhou High School of Jiangsu Province
- HanJiang High School Of Jiangsu Province
- Yangzhou Xinhua High School
- Shuren School of Yangzhou Middle School Education Group
- High School Affiliated to Yangzhou University
- Yangzhou NO.1 Middle School
- Guazhou High School
- Jiangdu High School of Jiangsu Province
- Baoying High School of Jiangsu Province
- Gaoyou High School of Jiangsu Province
- Yizheng High School of Jiangsu Province

== Sister cities and twin towns ==
- Balashikha, Moscow Oblast, Russia
- Kent, Washington, US
- Malacca City, Malaysia
- Neubrandenburg, Germany
- Offenbach am Main, Germany (since 1997)
- Orléans, France
- Nara, Japan
- Porirua, New Zealand
- Vaughan, Ontario, Canada
- Westport, Connecticut, US
- (United Kingdom) Colchester, UK
