= Weiyang =

Weiyang may refer to:

- Weiyang District, Xi'an (未央区; 未央區), Shaanxi, China
- Weiyang District, Yangzhou (维扬区; 維揚區), former district in Jiangsu, China
- Weiyang Palace (未央宫; 未央宮), ancient Chinese palace near the city of Chang'an, currently known as Xi'an
- Weiyang school, or Guiyang school, a sect of Zen Buddhism
