= Crane Mosque =

Mosque in Yangzhou, Jiangsu, China

- 仙鹤寺
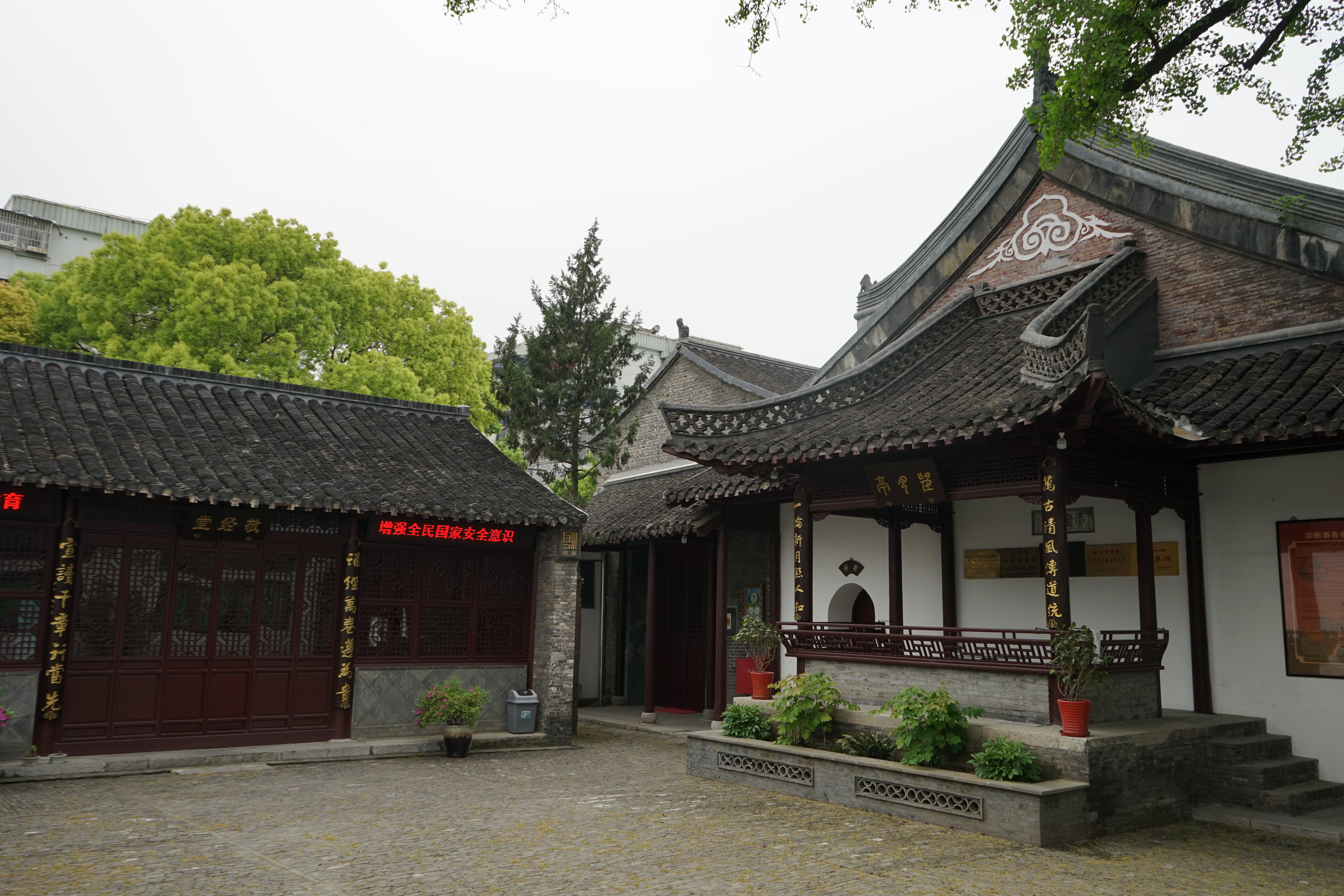

- Location of the mosques in Jiangsu

Religion
- Affiliation: Sunni Islam
- Ecclesiastical or organizational status: Mosque
- Status: Active

Location
- Location: Yangzhou, Jiangsu
- Country: China
- Interactive map of Crane Mosque
- Coordinates: 32°23′48″N 119°26′24″E

Architecture
- Type: Mosque
- Style: Chinese
- Founder: Puhading
- Completed: Disputed: 1275 CE (original); 1390 CE (reconstruction); 1523 CE (renovation)

Major cultural heritage sites under national-level protection
- Official name: Xianhe Mosque 仙鹤寺
- Type: Cultural
- Criteria: Religion
- Designated: 7 October 2019
- Reference no.: 8-0269-3-072

The Crane Mosque, also known by its Chinese name as the Xianhe Mosque and by other names, is a mosque located in Yangzhou, in the Jiangsu province of China.

The mosque was listed as a Chinese major cultural heritage site in 2019.

== Etymology ==
The English name, Crane Mosque, is a partial calque of its Chinese name 仙鶴寺, pronounced Xiānhè Sì in Mandarin. The name is sometimes explained by the supposed resemblance of the mosque's shape to a crane, although the Chinese name references a Taoist immortal. As the most historically important mosque in the city, it is also known as the Yangzhou Mosque and as the Qingbai Liufang Mosque.

== History ==
The Crane Mosque was reportedly built in 1275 CE by Puhaddin, an Arab Muslim and 16th-generation descendant of Muhammad, in the year after his death and the year before the Mongol general Bayan received the surrender of Yangzhou following the execution of Li Tingzhi by the Southern Song.

The mosque was severely damaged during the Red Turban Rebellion that ended the Mongolian Yuan dynasty. An Arab Muslim named Hasan rebuilt the mosque in 1390 under the early Ming. It was further renovated and refurbished in 1523 under the Jiajing Emperor.

The Crane Mosque is accounted as one of the Four Great Mosques of China—alongside the Huaisheng, Qingjing, and Phoenix Mosques in Guangzhou, Quanzhou, and Hangzhou—and was inscribed as a cultural relic protected by the Jiangsu government in April 1995. It now includes a small collection of documents concerning China's relations with Muslim countries.

== See also ==
Crane Mosque
- Traditional Chinese: 仙鶴寺
- Simplified Chinese: 仙鹤寺
- Literal meaning: Immortal Crane Temple
Transcriptions
Standard Mandarin
- Hanyu Pinyin: Xiānhè Sì
- Wade–Giles: Hsien-ho SSu

Qingbai Liufang Mosque
- Chinese: 清白流芳大寺
- Literal meaning: Pure & Renowned Great Temple
Transcriptions
Standard Mandarin
- Hanyu Pinyin: Qīngbái Liúfāng Dàsì
- Wade–Giles: Ch'ing-pai Liu-fang Ta Ssu

- Islam in China
- List of mosques in China
- List of Major National Historical and Cultural Sites in Jiangsu
