= Puhaddin =

Coordinates: 32°23′48″N 119°26′55″E

- Chinese: 普哈丁
Transcriptions
Standard Mandarin
- Hanyu Pinyin: Pǔhādīng
- Wade–Giles: P'u-ha-ting

Tomb of Puhaddin
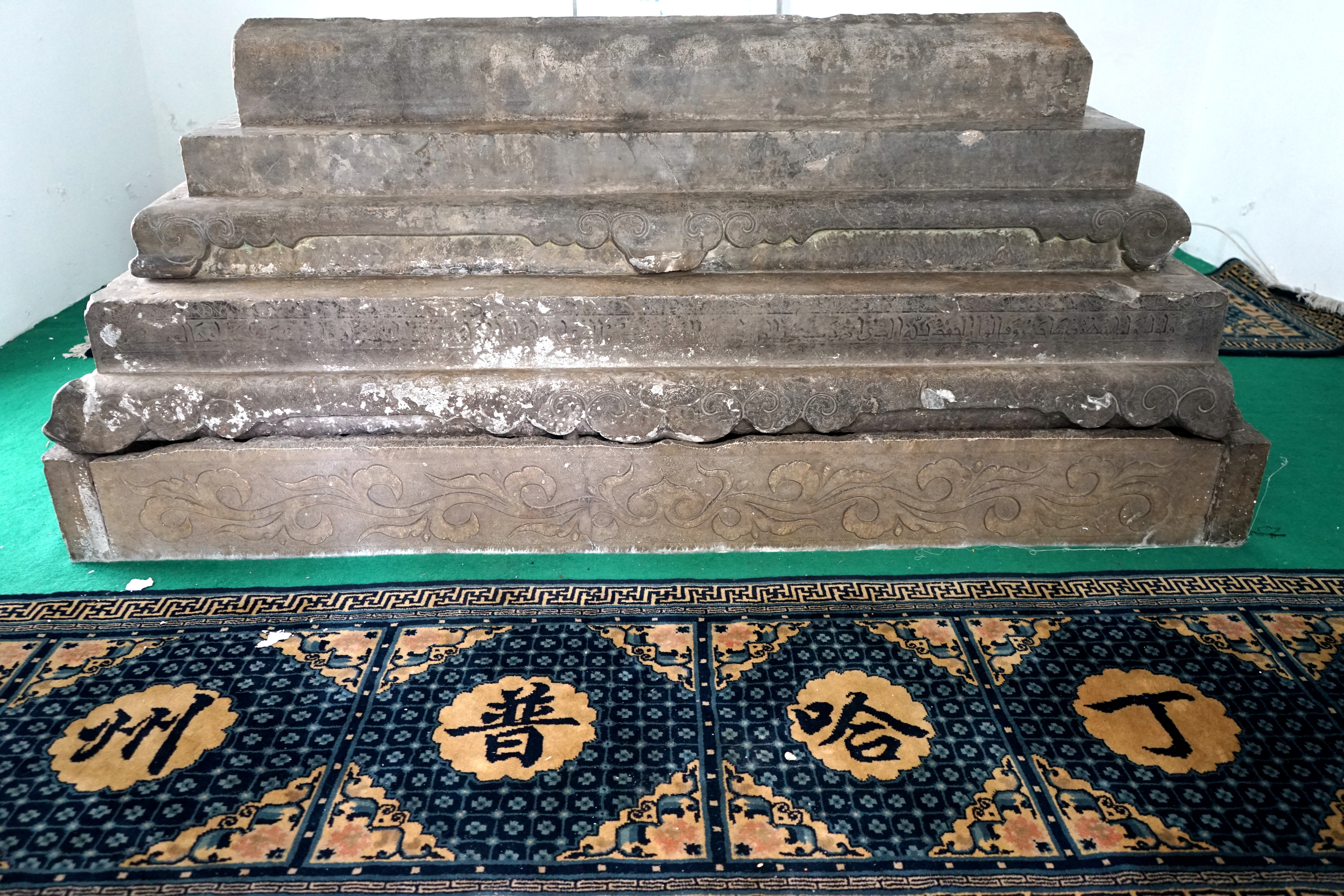
- Puhaddin's tomb in Yangzhou, China
- Chinese: 普哈丁墓
Transcriptions
Standard Mandarin
- Hanyu Pinyin: Pǔhādīng Mù
- Wade–Giles: P'u-ha-ting Mu

Puhaddin (fl. 13th century), sinified as Puhading, was a 16th-generation descendant of the Islamic prophet Muhammad who supposedly proselytized in China between 1265 and 1274 during the Mongol conquest of the Southern Song dynasty.

He is credited with the erection of the Crane Mosque on the east bank of the Grand Canal in eastern Yangzhou, Jiangsu, where his tomb is still preserved in a Ming graveyard.
