= Shuren School of Yangzhou Middle School Education Group =

Private school in Yangzhou, Jiangsu, China

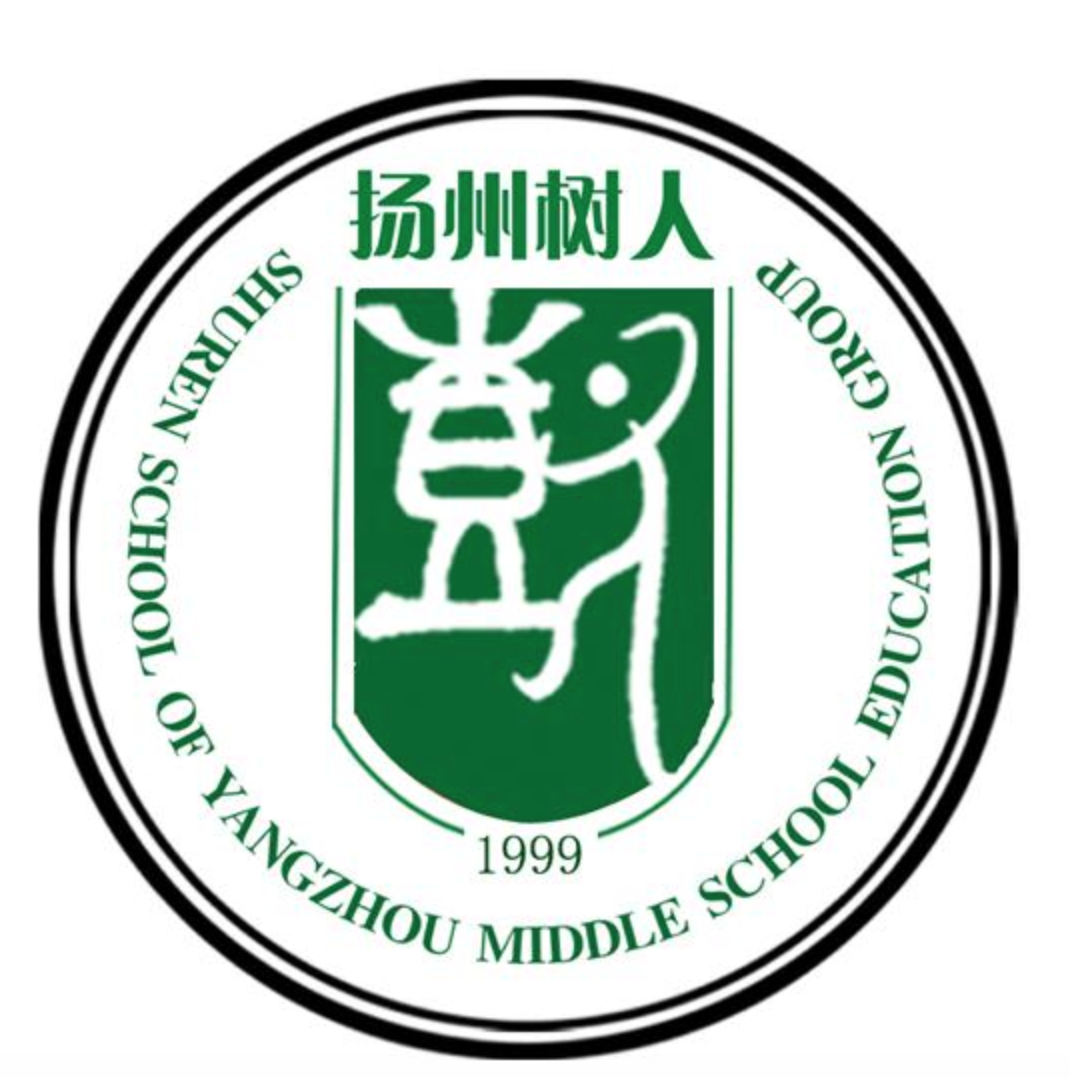
Yangzhou Shuren School

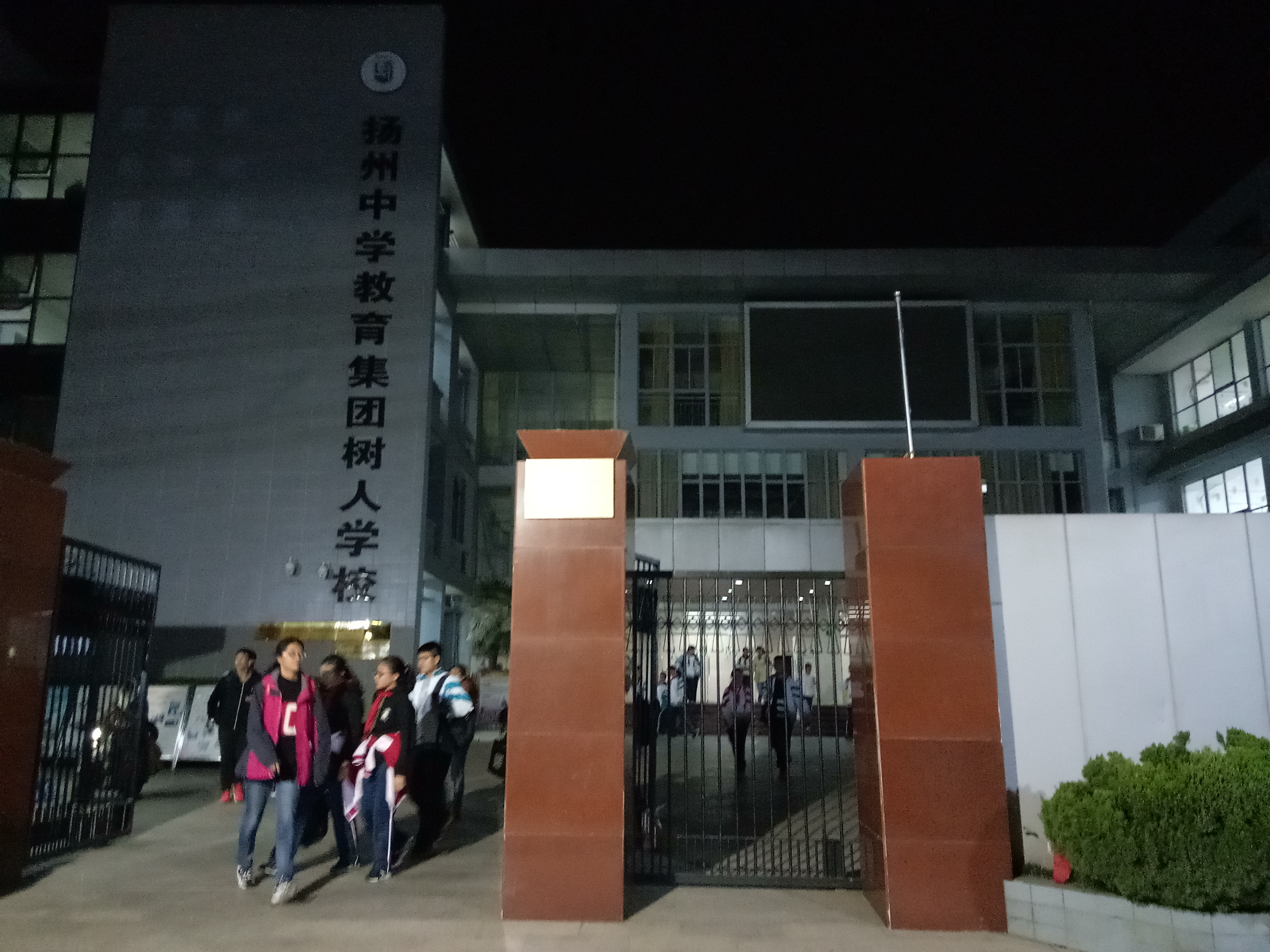
Yangzhou Shuren School, Nanmenjie Campus

Yangzhou Shuren School or Shuren School of Yangzhou Middle School Education Group is a private school in Yangzhou, China, founded with the approval from Yangzhou Municipal Government in June 1999. It has 74 classes for middle school, and 4 classes for high school; there are approximately 4,000 students in two campuses located at Nanmen Street and Jiulong Hu.

Since it started, the school has made use of the educational resources of Yangzhou Middle School. The school hires foreign teachers to teach students and organizes international activities for teachers and students. Teachers teach students in small classes which usually only have 30 students. In management Shuren School adopts the modern managerial method whereby its schoolmaster assumes all executive powers under authorization of the school board. A parents' committee manages the school.
