= Yangzhou Xinhua High School =

- 扬州市新华中学
- Campus in 2026
- Yangzijiang Road; Yangzhou, Jiangsu 225009; China

Information
- Former names: Private Yangzhou High School
- Type: Public
- Established: 1926
- Principal: Fang Lei
- Website: www.yzxhzx.com

Yangzhou Xinhua High School (simplified Chinese: 扬州市新华中学; traditional Chinese: 揚州市新華中學; pinyin: Yángzhōushì Xīnhuá Zhōngxué) is a high school in Jiangsu. It is located at No. 728, Yangzijiang Middle Road, Yangzhou City, Jiangsu Province, China. It is a high school in Jiangsu Province. The school was founded in 1926, and it was called "Private Yangzhou High School (Chinese: 私立扬州中学)" at that time.

== History ==
- October 1926, the school's predecessor, Private Yangzhou High School, was established.
- In 1950, it was renamed Yangzhou Private Xinhua High School (私立扬州新华中学), during which it merged with Private Hanjiang High School (私立邗江中学), Private Jingjin High School (私立竞进中学), Xiyuan High School (西苑中学) and Jimei High School (集美中学).
- In 1956, it was renamed as Yangzhou Xinhua High School.

== Overview ==
Yangzhou Xinhua High School is an ordinary high school in Jiangsu Province, founded in 1926. Originally named "Private Yangzhou High School", the school was later merged with several schools. Changed to its current name in 1956. In 2006, it was rated as a four-star high school in Jiangsu Province.

As of March 2018, the school covers an area of 60,129.1 square meters and a building area of 56,364.55 square meters; there are 46 classes and a total of 2,386 students.
