= Weiyang District, Yangzhou =

Former district of Yangzhou, Jiangsu, China

Coordinates: 32°25′48″N 119°24′36″E

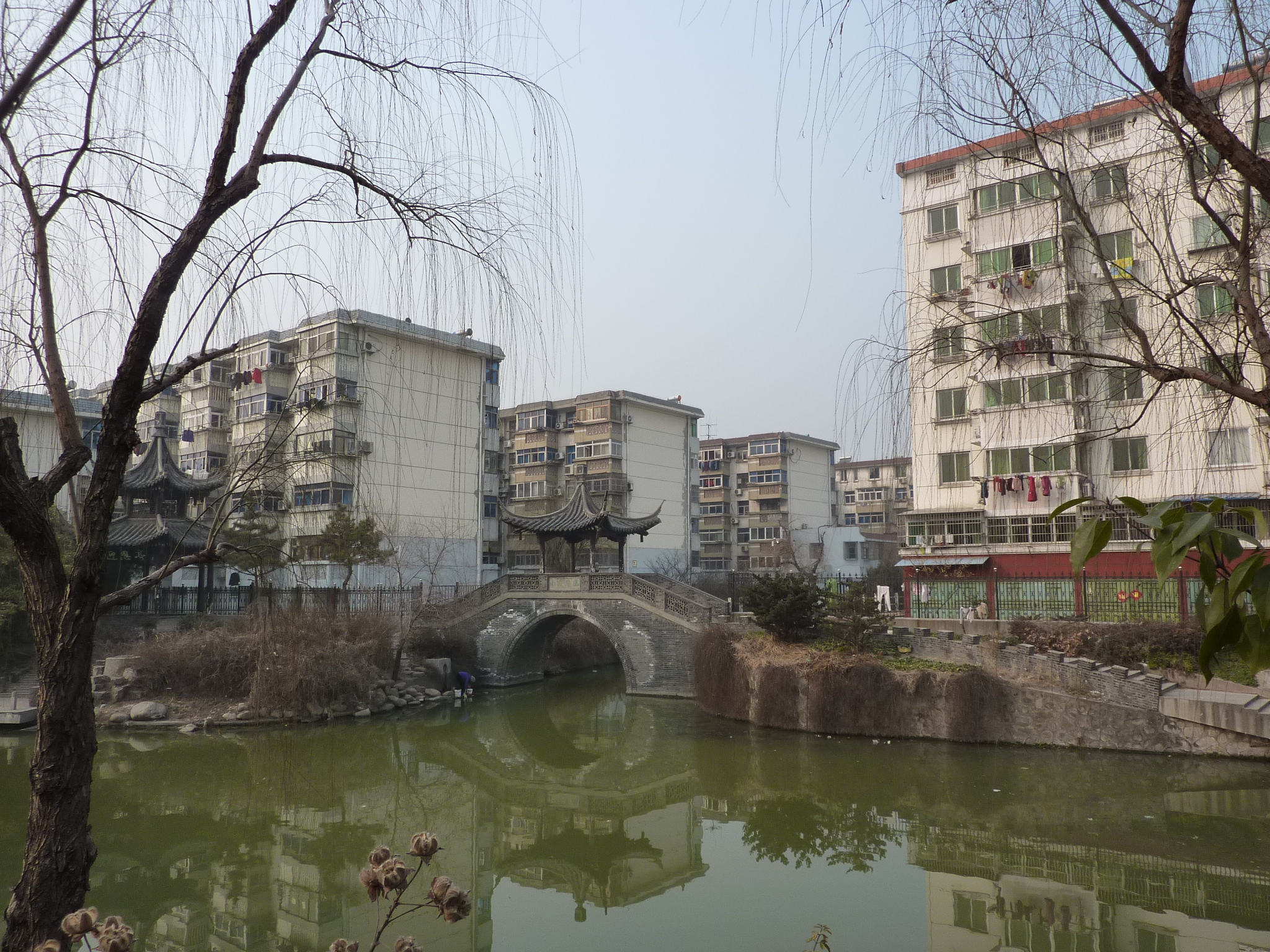
The Caohe Canal (foreground) and Ying'en Pavilion (center left) in the former Weiyang District

Weiyang District (simplified Chinese: 维扬区; traditional Chinese: 維揚區; pinyin: Wéiyáng Qū) was a district of the city of Yangzhou, Jiangsu province, People's Republic of China. In November 2011, it was merged into Hanjiang District.

The district included the northern part of Yangzhou's main urban area, and adjacent suburbs.
