= Yizheng High School =

Secondary school in Jiangsu Province, China

- Chinese: 仪征中学

Information
- Established: 1942; 84 years ago
- Staff: 189
- Teaching staff: 159
- Enrollment: c. 2,400

Yizheng High School (simplified Chinese: 仪征中学; traditional Chinese: 儀徵中學; pinyin: Yízhēng zhōngxué) was built in 1942 in Jiangsu Province, People's Republic of China. In 1980, it was named one of the first established high schools in Jiangsu Province. In 1992, it was identified as a qualified high school of Jiangsu Province. In 2004, it became a four-star ordinary high school.

== Brief introduction ==
Jiangsu Yizheng High School now has 48 classes, 2,400 students and 189 school staff (159 full-time teachers) including 4 special-grade teachers, 50 senior teachers and 52 first-grade teachers.

== Mission, philosophy, principle ==
The school has an educational mission of "being a first-class school of three dimensions and educating a batch of high-qualified Chinese citizens". Its educational philosophy is "people oriented, moral first, legal administration, rule following". Its educational principle is "education is basic, quality is life, teaching is core, scientific is backbone, management is guarantee, a teacher is the key, a leader is serving, development is the absolute principle".
