= Ministry of Justice Investigation Bureau =

Criminal investigation agency in Taiwan

- 法務部調查局; Fǎwù Bù Diàochá Jú (Mandarin); Fap-vu Phu Thiàu-chhà Khiu̍k (Hakka)

Agency overview
- Formed: 1928
- Jurisdiction: Taiwan (Republic of China)
- Headquarters: Xindian, New Taipei
- Agency executive: Michael Chen, Director-General
- Parent agency: Ministry of Justice; Ministry of the Interior (1949-1956)
- Website: www.mjib.gov.tw/en/

The Ministry of Justice Investigation Bureau (MJIB; Chinese: 法務部調查局; pinyin: Fǎwù Bù Diàochá Jú; Pe̍h-ōe-jī: Hoat-bū-pō͘ Tiau-cha-kio̍k) is a Republic of China (Taiwan) agency responsible for criminal investigation and intelligence gathering. It is subordinate to the Ministry of Justice, and its personnel are classified as judicial police. The headquarters is located in Xindian District, New Taipei City, Taiwan. The bureau has investigation offices and maritime investigation offices in the provinces and municipalities and investigation stations in each county and city. It is responsible for tasks related to maintaining national security and investigating major crimes. Additionally, there are mobile workstations in four regions: northern, central, southern, and eastern, which serve as specialized case-handling units. Its anti-corruption work is similar to that of the Independent Commission Against Corruption (Hong Kong) or the Corrupt Practices Investigation Bureau (Singapore). Its anti-drug operations are akin to those of the FBI and the Drug Enforcement Administration (USA). MJIB is a National Member of Egmont Group of Financial Intelligence Units and Asia/Pacific Group on Money Laundering.

== History ==
In January 1928, Dai Li, a liaison officer of the National Revolutionary Army Headquarters, established the "Secret Investigation Unit of the National Revolutionary Army Headquarters", specifically responsible for collecting and investigating military intelligence during the Northern Expedition, marking the first intelligence investigation organization in the Republic of China.

In September 1932, the National Government established the "Investigation and Statistics Bureau of the Military Commission of the National Government", commonly known as "Military Statistics" or "Juntong". It consisted of two departments: the first was responsible for the affairs of the Kuomintang, while the second handled intelligence.

In 1937, during the Second Sino-Japanese War, Juntong was reorganized: the first department became the "Investigation and Statistics Bureau of the Kuomintang Central Executive Committee", commonly referred to as "Zhongtong", under the Kuomintang Central Executive Committee. The original Juntong continued to focus on military intelligence, which eventually evolved into the "Military Intelligence Bureau".

After the victory in the Second Sino-Japanese War, on April 17, 1947, the Kuomintang Central Executive Committee decided to dissolve the Zhongtong Bureau. Subsequently, Zhongtong was renamed the "Kuomintang Party Member Communication Bureau", abbreviated as "Party Communication Bureau", with Ye Xiufeng continuing as director. To reduce the expansion of Kuomintang offices and party expenses, the leadership of the Party Communication Bureau and party investigation units remained within the party offices, while other units were transferred to various government departments (such as the 6th and 7th Divisions of the Directorate General of Budget, Accounting and Statistics, the 4th Division of the Ministry of the Interior, and the Special Economic Investigation Division of the Ministry of Economic Affairs). However, they were still under the control of the Party Communication Bureau.

In April 1949, the Party Communication Bureau was transferred to the Ministry of the Interior, and renamed the "Investigation Bureau of the Ministry of the Interior". In December of the same year, the Investigation Bureau moved to Taiwan along with the Government of the Republic of China. In 1955, the Bureau of Investigation and Statistics was reorganized into the Ministry of National Defense Intelligence Bureau, with counterintelligence duties transferred to the Investigation Bureau.

On June 1, 1956, the Investigation Bureau was reassigned to the Ministry of Justice Administration (now the Ministry of Justice), and was renamed the "Investigation Bureau of the Ministry of Justice Administration". On August 1, 1980, following the restructuring of the Ministry of Justice Administration, it was renamed the "Investigation Bureau of the Ministry of Justice".

On April 23, 1997, following the approval of the Executive Yuan, the bureau established the "Anti-Money Laundering Center" under the "Guidelines for the Establishment of the Anti-Money Laundering Center of the Ministry of Justice Investigation Bureau", responsible for handling financial intelligence and anti-money laundering operations. In June 1998, at the 6th annual meeting of the Egmont Group, the bureau's Anti-Money Laundering Center joined the Egmont Group. On December 19, 2007, the Presidential Office promulgated the "Organization Act of the Ministry of Justice Investigation Bureau", with Article 2, Clause 7 specifying that the bureau handles "anti-money laundering matters", and Article 3 establishing the "Anti-Money Laundering Division" within the bureau.

== Duties ==
According to the "s:Organization Act of the Ministry of Justice Investigation Bureau", the Investigation Bureau is responsible for two major tasks and one specific function:

Two Major Tasks: The Ministry of Justice Investigation Bureau is the judicial investigation agency of the Republic of China. Its primary tasks are maintaining national security and investigating major crimes, including the prevention of treason and espionage. It also protects state secrets; collaborates with the National Security Bureau and the Ministry of National Defense to counter information warfare and cognitive warfare from abroad (with the Ministry of Foreign Affairs and the Mainland Affairs Council handling external affairs, while the Investigation Bureau works with the Ministry of Digital Affairs to track domestic collaborators and useful idiots); it is also responsible for anti-corruption, election bribery investigations, internal security investigations, and the prevention of illegal firearms, drugs, organized crime, Humbug, and money laundering.

One Specific Function: To effectively combat crime, the Investigation Bureau has established specialized units for forensic science and cybersecurity to enhance its ability to maintain national security and investigate major crimes. Additionally, the bureau offers public services such as DNA and family relationship testing, and the verification of burned or damaged banknotes, as well as identifying counterfeit currency and alcohol to trace sources of counterfeit money and fake alcohol.

The Cybersecurity Division of the bureau includes the "Cybersecurity Forensics Laboratory", which was completed in 2006. After its official inauguration by President Chen Shui-bian on December 26 of the same year, it became Taiwan’s first digital forensics laboratory. On November 28, 2013, it passed the ISO/IEC 17025 international accreditation, becoming the first forensic science laboratory in Taiwan recognized by the Taiwan Accreditation Foundation (TAF) with "data recovery" capabilities. Its services include: computer forensics, digital data storage media forensics, mobile device forensics, multimedia file forensics, and damaged hard drive data recovery.

== Chain of command ==
Administratively, MJIB is answerable to the Minister of Justice. As a result, all public procurators at all level are able to direct the human resource of MJIB. Operationally, MJIB is subjected to the coordination and supervision of National Security Bureau. The director of MJIB could be summoned by the Taiwan President for consultant because of MJIB's eighth and ninth missions of responsibility in Taiwan.
