= Central Bureau of Investigation and Statistics =

Intelligence agency in Nationalist China (1927–1946)

The Central Bureau of Investigation and Statistics (CBIS; Chinese: 中國國民黨中央執行委員會調查統計局; pinyin: Zhōngguó Guómíndǎng Zhōngyāng Zhíxíng Wěiyuánhuì Diàochá Tǒngjì Jú, commonly known as Zhongtong (Chinese: 中統), was an intelligence unit under the Organisation Department of the Central Executive Committee of the Kuomintang. It was one of Chiang Kai-shek's two police and military intelligence agencies, the other being the Military Bureau of Investigation and Statistics headed by Dai Li from 1929 until his death in 1946. The CBIS focused on civilian intelligence, while the MBIS targeted military activities.

The CBIS bureau was largely superseded by the Ministry of Justice Investigation Bureau in Taiwan after 1949.

== History ==
The previous body of CBIS had its origin in the CC Clique, which was founded in 1927 as a secret spying agency.

In 1931, Chen Lifu was appointed the head of the Kuomintang's Organization Department and he set up the intelligence unit.

In 1935, this intelligence body was re-organized as the Central Bureau of Investigation and Statistics.

The CBIS was created in March 1938 during the KMT’s Provisional National Congress upon the proposal of Chiang Kai-shek. It was established from the First Section of the Military Affairs Commission’s Department of Investigation and Statistics and placed under the Central Executive Committee of the Kuomintang.

The bureau’s director was concurrently the KMT’s Secretary-General, while the deputy director managed day-to-day operations. Chen Lifu, Zhang Lisheng, and Zhu Jiahua successively served as directors, with Xu Enzeng, Ye Xiufeng, Gu Jianzhong, Zou Xuejun, and Ji Yuanpu among those who served as deputy directors.

The CBIS used local KMT party branches as its operational base. Investigation and statistics offices were established at provincial and municipal levels, and designated personnel handled “investigation and statistics” work in subordinate branches. Within universities, cultural organizations, and key secondary schools, the bureau created extensive “party membership investigation networks” to conduct intelligence and counterintelligence activities.

In April 1938, Zhu Jiahua was appointed Secretary-General of the Kuomintang, Chairman of the Party Affairs Committee, and concurrently Director of the Central Bureau of Investigation and Statistics, with Xu Enzeng as deputy director. Zhu, originally aligned with the CC Clique led by Chen Guofu and Chen Lifu, became embroiled in a power struggle with Xu, who was supported by the Chen brothers. This internal rivalry over the leadership of the CBIS led Zhu to align with the Three Principles of the People Youth Corps, the KMT Reorganization Faction, and politician Ding Weifen to curb the CC Clique’s influence within the party.

In November 1944, Zhu was appointed Minister of Education of the National Government and resigned from his CBIS post. Leadership of the bureau then passed to Xu Enzeng and later Ye Xiufeng.

In January 1945, Chiang Kai-shek dismissed Xu Enzeng from all positions and permanently barred him from government service, appointing Ye Xiufeng as acting director of the CBIS. Ye officially assumed the position in February 1945.

By the mid-1940s, the CBIS’s power began to wane. During the Second Sino-Japanese War, the KMT’s intelligence focus shifted from countering the Chinese Communist Party to confronting Japanese forces, elevating the status of the military-run Juntong while weakening the party-controlled CBIS. The agency’s networks were also severely disrupted as large areas of China fell under Japanese occupation.

On 17 April 1947, the KMT’s Central Standing Committee resolved to abolish the Central Bureau of Investigation and Statistics and reorganize it as the Party Communications Bureau (Chinese: 中國國民黨黨員通訊局, abbreviated Dangtongju). Ye Xiufeng continued to serve as director. To reduce redundancy and financial strain within the KMT structure, many investigative units were transferred to government organs such as the National Government’s Accounting Office (Sixth and Seventh Divisions), the Ministry of the Interior’s Fourth Department, and the Ministry of Economic Affairs’ Special Economic Investigation Office—though in practice they remained under the Party Communications Bureau’s control.

In May 1949, as the National Government prepared to relocate to Taiwan, the Party Communications Bureau’s principal functions were transferred to the newly established Investigation Bureau of the Ministry of the Interior, under the Executive Yuan. The bureau remained under KMT influence. Ji Yuanpu served as its first director, with Zhang Yimin as deputy director.

After the government’s retreat to Taiwan, the bureau was reorganized in October 1954 under the Ministry of Justice as the Investigation Bureau (now the Ministry of Justice Investigation Bureau). Its responsibilities shifted toward internal security, anti-corruption, narcotics enforcement, and major economic crime prevention, while continuing to undertake political security operations under the oversight of the National Security Bureau.

== Organization ==
At its inception, the CBIS consisted of three divisions, eight sections, one department, and one office:

- First Division – Section 1 (Administration), Section 2 (Intelligence and Communications)
- Second Division – Section 3 (Party Member Networks), Section 4 (Party Investigation), Section 5 (Social Investigation)
- Third Division – Section 6 (Political Investigation), Section 7 (Economic Investigation), Section 8 (Japanese Collaboration Investigation)

At its peak, the bureau’s headquarters operated six departments, six offices, five committees, and one experimental zone in Chongqing. Provincial-level branches were known as “investigation and statistics offices.”

The CBIS classified its personnel into four main categories:

1. Investigative staff (調查工作人員)
2. Special intelligence officers (特種情報人員)
3. Party membership surveillance network (CC Party Network)
4. Correspondents (通訊員) embedded within institutions, schools, and enterprises

Before the 1940s, the CBIS wielded substantial influence, with its intelligence networks extending throughout the KMT’s organizational hierarchy. Many local party leaders also served as CBIS agents. At its height, the bureau employed nearly 50,000 operatives across military, police, administrative, transportation, and diplomatic institutions, engaging in surveillance, arrests, kidnappings, and assassinations.

During and after the Second Sino-Japanese War, however, the CBIS gradually declined in prominence, overshadowed by the Bureau of Investigation and Statistics (Juntong). Following the KMT’s relocation to Taiwan, the CBIS ceased to exist as an independent entity, though its institutional legacy lived on in Taiwan’s Ministry of Justice Investigation Bureau.

== See also ==
- Ministry of Justice Investigation Bureau
- National Security Bureau (Taiwan)
- Bureau of Investigation and Statistics
- Republic of China (1912–1949)
- Kuomintang
