= Imperial Gardens =

Many imperial gardens exist in Asia including:

- the old name of the Old Summer Palace in Beijing, China, also known as the Gardens of Perfect Brightness
- the Beihai Park and Zhongnanhai in Beijing, China
- the Tokyo Imperial Palace in Tokyo, Japan
