= Bureau of Investigation and Statistics =

Intelligence agency in Nationalist China (1927–1946)

Bureau of Investigation and Statistics (NBIS)
- 國民政府軍事委員會調查統計局; Guómín zhèngfǔ jūnshì wěiyuánhuì diàochá tǒngjìjú

Intelligence agency overview
- Formed: 1927
- Dissolved: 1946
- Superseding agencies: Taiwan Garrison Command; National Security Bureau (NSB); Military Intelligence Bureau (MIB)
- Jurisdiction: National Government of the Republic of China
- Ministers responsible: Dai Li; Mao Renfeng

The National Bureau of Investigation and Statistics (NBIS or BIS; Chinese: 國民政府軍事委員會調查統計局; pinyin: guómín zhèngfǔ jūnshì wěiyuánhuì diàochá tǒngjìjú), commonly known in Chinese as Juntong (traditional Chinese: 軍統; simplified Chinese: 军统; pinyin: Jūntǒng), was the military intelligence agency of the Republic of China before 1946. It was devoted to intelligence gathering and covert spying operation for purposes of national security and defense. It was originally headed by Dai Li, and after 1946 he was succeeded by Mao Renfeng. This agency was largely superseded by the Military Intelligence Bureau under the Ministry of National Defense in Taiwan.

The NBIS had a great influence amongst the Nationalist government's military, police, administration, and transportation agencies, as well as embassies and consulates abroad during the Dang Guo-era (1928–1946) of the Republic of China. It was often criticized by the political dissidents as a "secret police" involved in covert and espionage operation, including surveillance, kidnapping, assassinations, elimination and house-arrest against Chinese communists, Japanese spies as well as political dissidents.

During the Sino-Japanese War, the NBIS was involved in a number of counter-intelligence and covert espionage warfare against the Japanese invaders. There were NBIS agents who defected to the Japanese, and many of the secret police in Wang Jingwei's Japanese-occupied areas were former NBIS agents.

From a historical perspective, NBIS played a highly important role in Second Sino-Japanese War. Under the leadership of Dai Li, the Nationalist government had a body of 100,000 active spies involving in espionage warfare against Japanese, as well as against the Wang Jingwei regime in the Japanese-occupied areas.

== History ==
=== Early stages ===
The NBIS was founded in 1932 as the "Military Commission of Clandestine Investigation Section of the National Revolutionary Army" (Chinese: 國民革命軍總司令部密查組) with the "Special Works Department"(Chinese: 國民政府軍事委員會特務處) set up in 1932. When the "Investigation and Statistics Bureau" was established under the Military Commission, the "Special Works Department" was incorporated into the Bureau and renamed the "Second Division", and is responsible for intelligence collection and personnel training. All of the bureau's affairs were under the direct command of Chiang Kai-shek. Dai sought to make the Juntong into an extended family with himself as the stern paternal figure, stressing traditional Chinese Confucian values of filial piety, loyalty, benevolence, and righteousness. The Juntong operated as a traditional sworn brotherhood with all of the senior officers taking an oath making themselves into "brothers". The inspiration for the Juntong were the secret sworn brotherhoods portrayed in the classics of Chinese literature like Water Margin and The Romance of the Three Kingdoms. Dai presented himself as a stern Confucian father figure to the men and women of the Juntong and liked to quote from book The Dynastic History of the Han: "Is personal happiness possible before the extermination of the Xiongnu?" Reflecting this mentality, the men and women serving in the Juntong were forbidden to marry and expected to be celibate as their only love was to be China. The rules about celibacy were not always followed as Liu Gequing, the Juntong ace assassin fell in love with and had a relationship with a fellow agent, Lu Ti, during his time in Shanghai. Likewise, Juntong agents were expected to forsake smoking, gambling and playing mahjong as Dai wanted them to work hard and dedicate their lives totally to China. Reflecting this ethos of absolute dedication to the cause, many of the assassination missions that Juntong agents were sent on against the Chinese Communists and later on during the war with Japan were known to be suicide missions as the expectation was that Juntong agents were to value China more than their own lives. Dai often said that the Juntong were to serve Chiang "like dogs and horses serving their masters without a mind of their own" as Dai presented Chiang as "the Leader" to whom all Chinese had to obey unconditionally. As the world of espionage was a secretive one, Juntong agents were advised that they were to be "anonymous heroes" whose deeds would not be remembered by historians.

Juntong agents tended to come from the provincial schools as Dai disliked recruiting those who attended universities, whom the xenophobic, ultra-conservative Dai felt were too exposed to Western influence to fit into the Juntong. Juntong agents, especially those working as assassins were generally expected to know martial arts before joining, both to improve their skills at killing and because Dai felt the sort of self-discipline needed to master the martial arts was the same sort of dedication that he expected in his agents. Reflecting Dai's traditionalism, the model for the Juntong were the assassins of the Warring States period and those portrayed in The Romance of the Three Kingdoms. One of the most best loved books among the Juntong was the novel Jianghu qixia zhuan (Legendary Roving Knights of the Rivers and Lakes), a wuxia (martial arts) book that was very popular in Republican China. Dai liked the book so much that he recruited the kung fu master who was said to be the inspiration for the hero of Jianghu qixia zhuan into the Juntong. The men and women of the Juntong liked to see themselves as "knights" who would use their skills to defend the weak from the strong and save China from its enemies. A disproportionate number of the men and women of the Juntong came from the provinces of Hunan, Guangdong, and Zhejiang, all places where Western influence was limited and traditional values flourished.

In 1938, the Special Works Department was expanded and took over the "Investigation and Statistics Bureau" to cope with the increasingly demanding tasks of intelligence operations. Dai Li was assigned as the de facto responsibility for running the unit. Dai's preference for recruiting on the basis of familial loyalties, where one sibling would recruit other siblings to the Juntong proved to be a weakness, when in 1938 a number of Juntong agents defected over to work for the "reformed" government of Wang Jingwei, pitting brother literally against brother.

=== Sino-Japanese War period ===
During the Sino-Japanese War, NBIS had orchestrated the assassinations of several key Japanese enemy military and government personnel. Between 1937 and 1941, the Juntong, working together with the Green Gang triad, carried out 150 assassinations of Chinese collaborators and 40 Japanese officers in Shanghai alone. The Juntong favored assassinating Chinese collaborators over the Japanese partly because they were easier to kill as the Japanese tended to stick to certain enclaves, but mostly to prevent the Japanese from imposing any sort of ordered government in parts of China they had occupied. Japan had occupied vast sections of China inhabited by millions of people requiring hundreds of thousands of civil servants to administer while the number of Japanese who were fluent in Mandarin or Cantonese was limited, and to a very large extent the Japanese depended upon Chinese collaborators to administer China for them. Zhang Xiaolin, a leading member of the Green Gang who went over to the Japanese in 1937, was gunned down by a Juntong assassin. In October 1938, Tang Shaoyi, a former prime minister of the Republic of China who had agreed to serve the Japanese was killed at his home when a Juntong assassin posing as an antique dealer used the antique axe he was showing to Tang to smash in his head. As the Japanese had no idea of who the Juntong assassins were, they resorted to executing at random innocent people who had nothing to do with the assassinations.

On Chinese New Year (18 February 1939), four Juntong agents assassinated Chen Lu, the foreign minister of the Wang Jingwei puppet government as he paid respects to his ancestors in his mansion in the French Concession of Shanghai. Led by the Juntong ace assassin Liu Geqing, he and three others entered Chen's mansion as two of his bodyguards let them in, machine-gunned Chen down as he was paying his respects before the family shrine, and then draped over his corpse a scroll reading "Death to Collaborators! Long Live Generalissimo Chiang Kai-Shek!". Fu Xiaoan, the banker and shipping tycoon who had long been an enemy of the Kuomintang and had thrown in his lot with the Japanese, becoming the collaborating mayor of Shanghai, was hacked to death with a meat chopper in his bed by his cook who was secretly a Juntong assassin. In 1939, a banquet to celebrate the friendship between Japan and the Wang Jingwei regime attended by senior Japanese officers and Chinese collaborators in Shanghai were ruined when the cooks, many of whom were working for the Juntong, poisoned the food, and only prompt medical attention that required pumping the stomachs of the guests prevented hundreds of deaths. Later in 1939, a train, carrying various Japanese officers and officials of the Wang Jingwei regime from Shanghai to Nanking for a ceremony marking a new treaty that was meant to cement Wang's regime in its place in the "New Order in Asia", was blown up by Juntong agents, killing 74 and wounding hundreds more.

The main targets of the Juntong in Shanghai were not the Japanese, few of whom could speak any Mandarin and none well enough to disguise their origins. Rather, the Juntong targeted the secret service loyal to the Wang regime. This was based in the Huxi "badlands" district in Shanghai headed by Ding Mocun and Li Shiqun, two former Communists who defected first to the Juntong and then to the Japanese. The No. 76 organization, as it was known after its address at 76 Jessfield Road, was founded in February 1939 when Ding and Li presented themselves to General Kenji Doihara, the chief of Japanese intelligence in China, at a restaurant in Shanghai's "Little Tokyo" district and proclaimed their willingness to serve Japan, stating as former Juntong agents that they were the only men who could beat the Juntong at its own game. On 1 March 1939, the No. 76 organization came into being, and its liaison officer was Colonel Haruke Yoshitane of the Plum Blossom Agency, who in turn reported to Colonel Kagesa Sadaaki of the Kempeitai, the much feared Japanese military police. On 8 May 1939, Wu Shibao, a Green Gang member and the leader of "a gang of local thugs and bullies" agreed to become Li's bodyguard and to provide the "muscle" for the No. 76 organization. Li boasted in a speech "With the left hand we'll annihilate the Blue Shirts, with the right we'll knock down the C.C Clique!". The No. 76 organization, which moved into its base at No. 76 Jessfield Road in July 1939, was based in a mansion that had once belonged to the warlord General Chen Diaoyuan that was turned into a fortress with concrete blocks on the driveway and electrified iron gates as both Ding and Li had an obsessive fear of assassination.

As both Ding and Li had been senior Juntong agents until 1938 with Ding heading the Third Section of the Military Affairs Bureau until late 1938 while Li had been a member of the Green Gang, the two men knew the Juntong very well and in many ways the No. 76 organization was a mirror image of the Juntong. The collaborating secret police assassinated anti-Japanese Chinese; had powers to arrest without warrant, torture and to kill extrajudicially; kidnapped businessmen for ransom; and were deeply involved in organized crime, charging a "fee" to all of the opium dens, brothels and casinos of Shanghai to allow them to operate. In September 1939, Wang Tianmu, the chief Juntong agent in Shanghai was kidnapped on the Nanjing road by No. 76 agents, was taken to 76 Jessfield Road where he was held for three weeks before being released. Wang had not been tortured and Dai suspected that he had been "turned"; Dai ordered him assassinated and a Juntong agent shot him in the shoulder during a failed attempt to kill him.

The No. 76 organization blew up the headquarters of the Juntong in Shanghai while the Juntong assassins killed a dozen of No. 76 organization leaders in the fall of 1939. Wang's defection to the No. 76 organization proved a most serious blow as he betrayed all of the agents under his command, and the Kempeitai arrested dozens of Juntong agents in Shanghai, Beijing, and Tianjin due to the information provided by Wang. On 15 November 1939, Zhao Gangyi, the Juntong chief in Qingdao, fearing it was only a matter of time before the Kempeitai arrested him owing to the information provided by Wang, decided to save himself and defected over to the Wang regime, betraying all of the agents under his command to the Kempeitai. On 24 November 1939, thanks to information provided by Zhao, the Kempeitai raided the Juntong headquarters in Beijing.

On 21 December 1939, Ding was almost killed when his mistress Zheng Pingru, a girl born to a Chinese father and a Japanese mother, led him into a Juntong assassination attempt. When Ding ordered his men to execute Zheng, then aged 22, she asked them not to shoot her in the face, so she would still be beautiful at her funeral, a request that No. 76 execution squad honored. This incident is generally believed to have been the inspiration for the 1979 novella Lust, Caution by Eileen Chang, which in turn inspired the 2007 film Lust, Caution. On Christmas Eve 1939, Chen Mingchu, a former Juntong agent who had joined the No. 76 organization was assassinated by the Juntong agents at the Huierdeng nightclub in Shanghai. Chen and his twenty bodyguards were celebrating Christmas on the floor of the nightclub when a group of Juntong agents armed with machine-guns burst in to gun down Chen and his bodyguards. On 8 September 1940, Zhou Guangshi, the chief of Juntong operations in occupied China was captured by the Kempeitai who tortured and executed him. By late 1941, most of the Juntong agents operating in the major cities occupied by Japan were either killed or captured.

Various "guerrilla command" and "traffic police" groups under the NBIS carried out a wide range of covert espionage and counterintelligence activities against the Japanese and Japanese collaborators. In 1942, the Sino-American Cooperative Organization was founded, which led to 3,000 Americans being sent to China for joint operations with the Juntong. Dai's relations with the Office of Strategic Services (OSS) were unfriendly and at one point Dai warned William "Wild Bill" Donovan, the chief of the OSS: "If the OSS tries to operate outside of SACO, I will kill your agents". The Juntong co-operated with the OSS in parachuting agents, mostly Chinese-Americans, behind Japanese lines, but relations were stained in 1943 when the OSS sent Ilya Andreyevich Tolstoy to Tibet to contact the Dalai Lama as China's government did not recognize Tibet's de facto independence. China regarded Tibet, which had become de facto independent in 1911, as a breakaway province that was still legally part of China. China greatly resented the Tolstoy mission as a tacit American recognition of Tibetan independence. 18,000 registered NBIS intelligence agents lost their lives out of a total of 45,000 registered agents by the end of the war.

=== Chinese Civil War period ===
In August 1946, the Ministry of National Defense was established to replace the Military Commission, and the NBIS changed its name to the Counterintelligence Bureau under the Ministry of National Defense (Chinese: 保密局). Mao Renfeng was the director given the de facto responsibility for running the unit.

=== After 1949 in mainland China ===
After Nationalist government was moved to Taiwan in 1949, a number of BIS staff remained in mainland China for intelligence activities. The NBIS operatives were severely repressed by Chinese Communist government during the Campaign to Suppress Counterrevolutionaries, and were mostly executed by firing squad or received heavy punishment. By end of the 1950s, the NBIS staff were largely shot or serving hard labor on the mainland.

=== In Taiwan ===
In 1955, the Bureau was again reorganized as the Intelligence Bureau (Chinese: 國防部情報局), responsible for early-warning intelligence collection and strategic analysis. Since then, the Ministry of Justice took over the functions of counterintelligence and investigation from the Bureau.

On 1 July 1985, the Military Intelligence Bureau (Chinese: 國防部軍事情報局) was created by merging the Special Military Intelligence Office with the Intelligence Bureau. The Military Intelligence Bureau was subordinated to the Ministry of National Defense under the direct command of the Chief of the General Staff.

== See also ==
- Central Bureau of Investigation and Statistics, civilian equivalent during the mainland rule
- National Security Bureau
- Military Intelligence Bureau
- Military Intelligence Bureau
