= Five-Pavilion Bridge =

Five-Pavilion Bridge 五亭桥
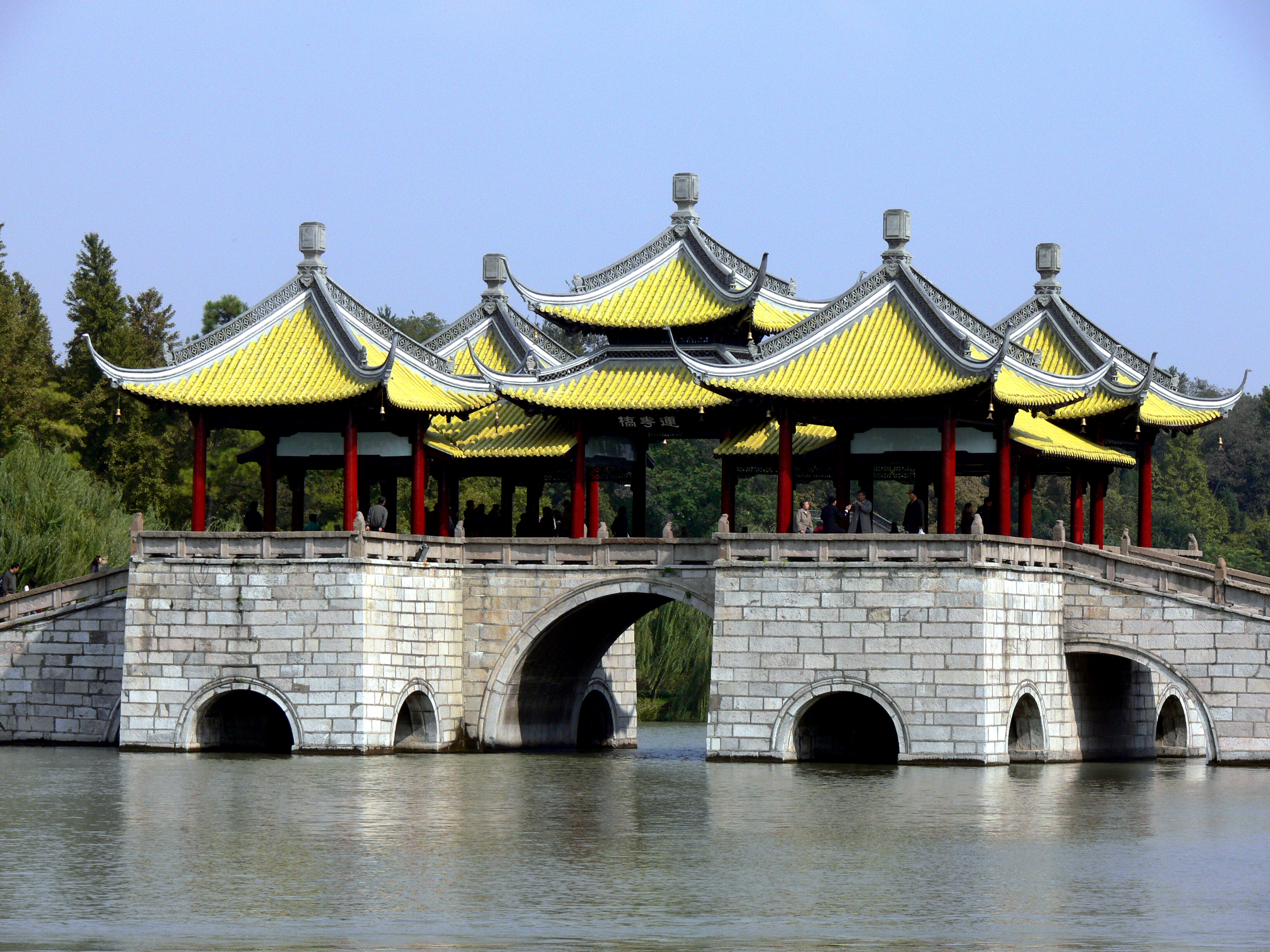
- Coordinates: 32°24′35″N 119°24′58″E
- Crosses: Slender West Lake
- Locale: Yangzhou, Jiangsu, China
- Other name: Lotus Blossom Bridge
- Heritage status: Nationally-Protected Cultural Heritage Site

Characteristics
- Material: Stone
- Total length: 55 m (180 ft)

History
- Opened: 1757

Location
- Interactive map of Five-Pavilion Bridge

Five-Pavilion Bridge
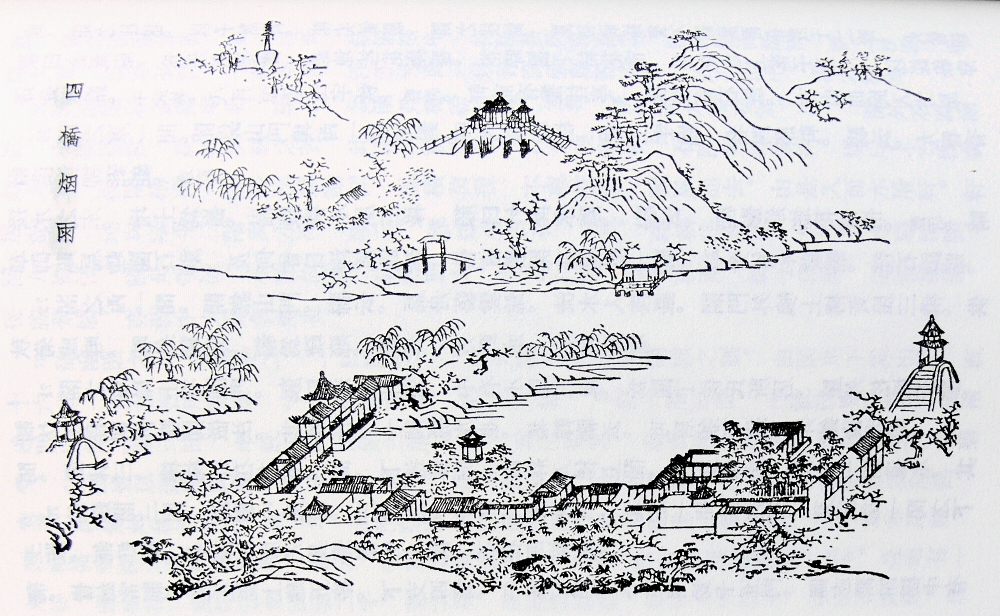
- "Four Bridges in Misty Rain", one of Yangzhou's 24 views under the Qing
- Traditional Chinese: 五亭橋
- Simplified Chinese: 五亭桥
- Literal meaning: "Five-Pavilion Bridge"
Transcriptions
Standard Mandarin
- Hanyu Pinyin: Wǔtíng Qiáo
- Wade–Giles: Wu^{3}-t'ing^{2} Ch'iao^{2}
- IPA: [ù.tʰǐŋ tɕʰjǎʊ]

Lotus Bridge
- Traditional Chinese: 蓮花橋
- Simplified Chinese: 莲花桥
- Literal meaning: "Lotus Blossom Bridge"
Transcriptions
Standard Mandarin
- Hanyu Pinyin: Liánhuā Qiáo
- Wade–Giles: Lien-hua Ch'iao

The Five-Pavilion Bridge, also known as the Lotus Bridge and by other names, is a covered stone arch footbridge in the Slender West Lake National Park in Hanjiang District, Yangzhou, in Jiangsu, China. It is one of the Four Bridges in Misty Rain, one of the 24 Views of Yangzhou under the Qing, and has become a landmark of the city.

== Names ==
The bridge is called the "Five-Pavilion Bridge". Its alternative name, "Lotus Bridge" or "Lotus Blossom Bridge", is a translation of the bridge's original Chinese name, either named for the Lotus Blossom Dyke that the bridge connects to on its southern side or for a supposed resemblance of its pavilions to the petals of a lotus flower.

== History ==
The bridge was constructed in 1757 (Qianlong 22), connecting the residences on the north bank of the lake to the back of the Temple of the Lotus Mind to the south. Its construction was funded by local salt merchants to welcome the Qianlong Emperor of the Qing dynasty during his second southern tour of Jiangnan. The bridge self-consciously mirrored the Five Dragon Pavilions in Beijing, combining with the earlier White Dagoba at the Lianxing Temple to emulate the capital's Beihai Park. Although representative of a Qing style of covered bridges variously known as "corridor bridges", "rain and wind bridges", and "pavilion bridges", it was still listed by the famed Chinese structural engineer Mao Yisheng as China's "most elegant and artistic bridge".

The bridge was greatly damaged during fighting between the Taiping and Qing armies over the course of 1853, with the pavilions entirely destroyed. They were subsequently repaired by the end of the Qing, but only three of the five pavilions remained standing in 1929. The bridge was later renovated in 1933, 1951–1953, 1956, and 1982. As the "Lotus Bridge", the Five-Pavilion Bridge was inscribed along with the nearby White Dagoba as the 533rd Major Cultural Heritage Site under National-Level Protection added during the 6th round of nominations on 25 May 2006.

== Structure ==
The bridge is 55.3 meters (181 ft) long. It rests on 12 granite bases of various sizes, supporting 15 arches in three styles. The largest arch has a span of 7 meters (23 ft). The largest central pavilion is connected to the four smaller pavilions at each corner by covered walkways. The present pavilions rise on scarlet pillars and are covered with imperial yellow tiles.

== See also ==
- List of Major National Historical and Cultural Sites in Jiangsu
- List of bridges in China
- List of bridges with buildings
