= Xu Garden, Yangzhou =

Chinese garden in Hanjiang District, Yangzhou, China

Coordinates: 32°24′34″N 119°25′11″E

Xu Garden
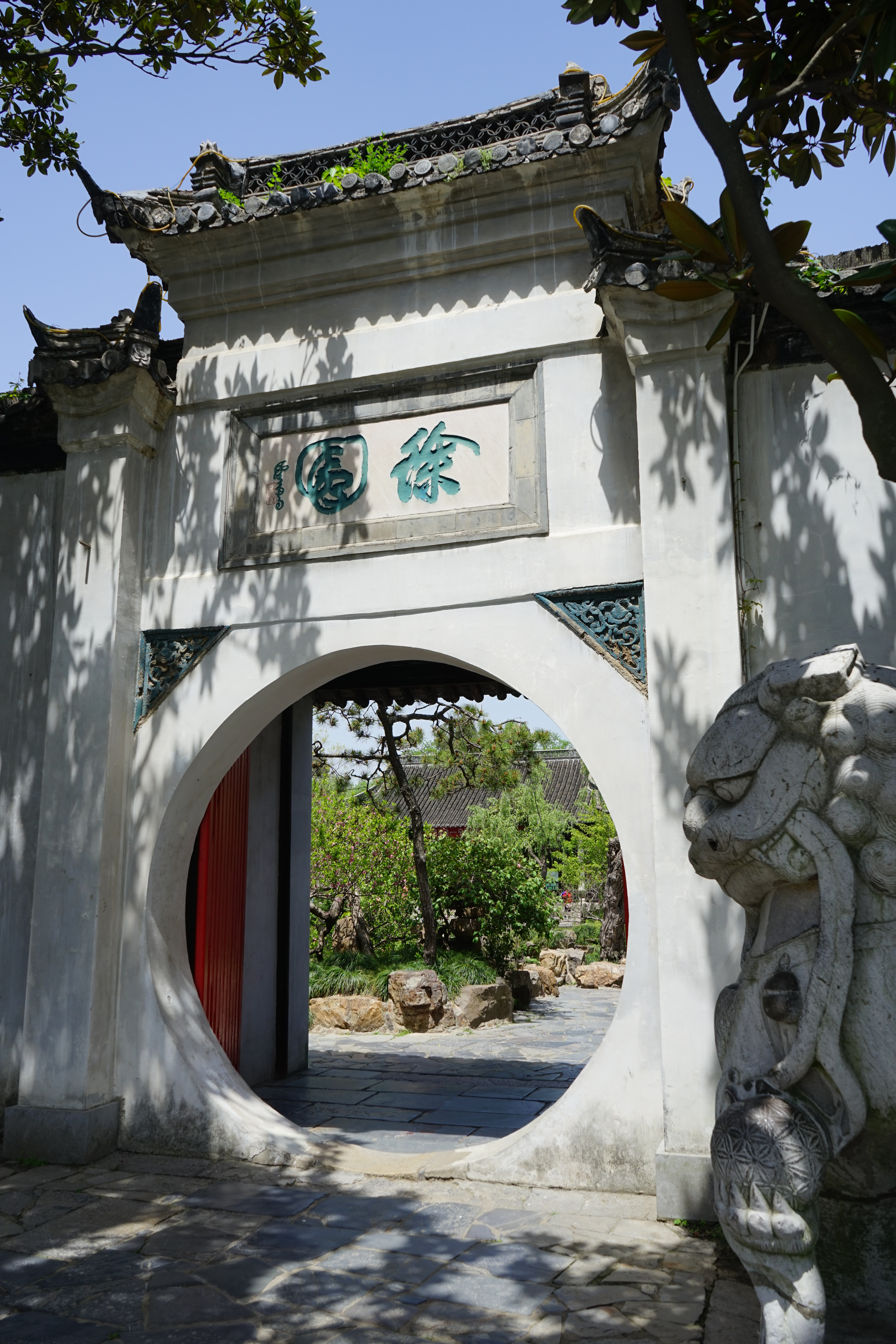
- The entrance to Xu Garden, its name written right to left in the archaic style and guarded by a foo dog
- Traditional Chinese: 徐園
- Simplified Chinese: 徐园
- Literal meaning: Xu Garden
Transcriptions
Standard Mandarin
- Hanyu Pinyin: Xú Yuán
- Wade–Giles: Hsü Yüan

Xu Garden, also known by its Chinese name of Xuyuan, Xu Yuan, or Xuyuan Garden, is a Chinese garden in Slender West Lake National Park in Hanjiang District, Yangzhou, China. It is particularly noted for its views and for the interior woodwork of its pavilions.

== Name ==
Xu Garden is named for Xu Baoshan (t 徐寶山, s 徐宝山, Xú Bǎoshān; 1866 – 24 May 1913), a warlord of the late Qing and early Republican eras, who was often based in Yangzhou.

== History ==
Xu Garden was built in 1915 on the site of the former Peach Blossom Dock (t 桃花塢, s 桃花坞, Táohuā Wù) garden. Designed by Yang Bingyan, the garden was established by locals in appreciation of Xu's protection and patronage. Open to the public, it originally covered about 10 mu (0.6 ha or 1.5 acres) and included lotus ponds, pavilions, terraces, and open halls.

== Components ==
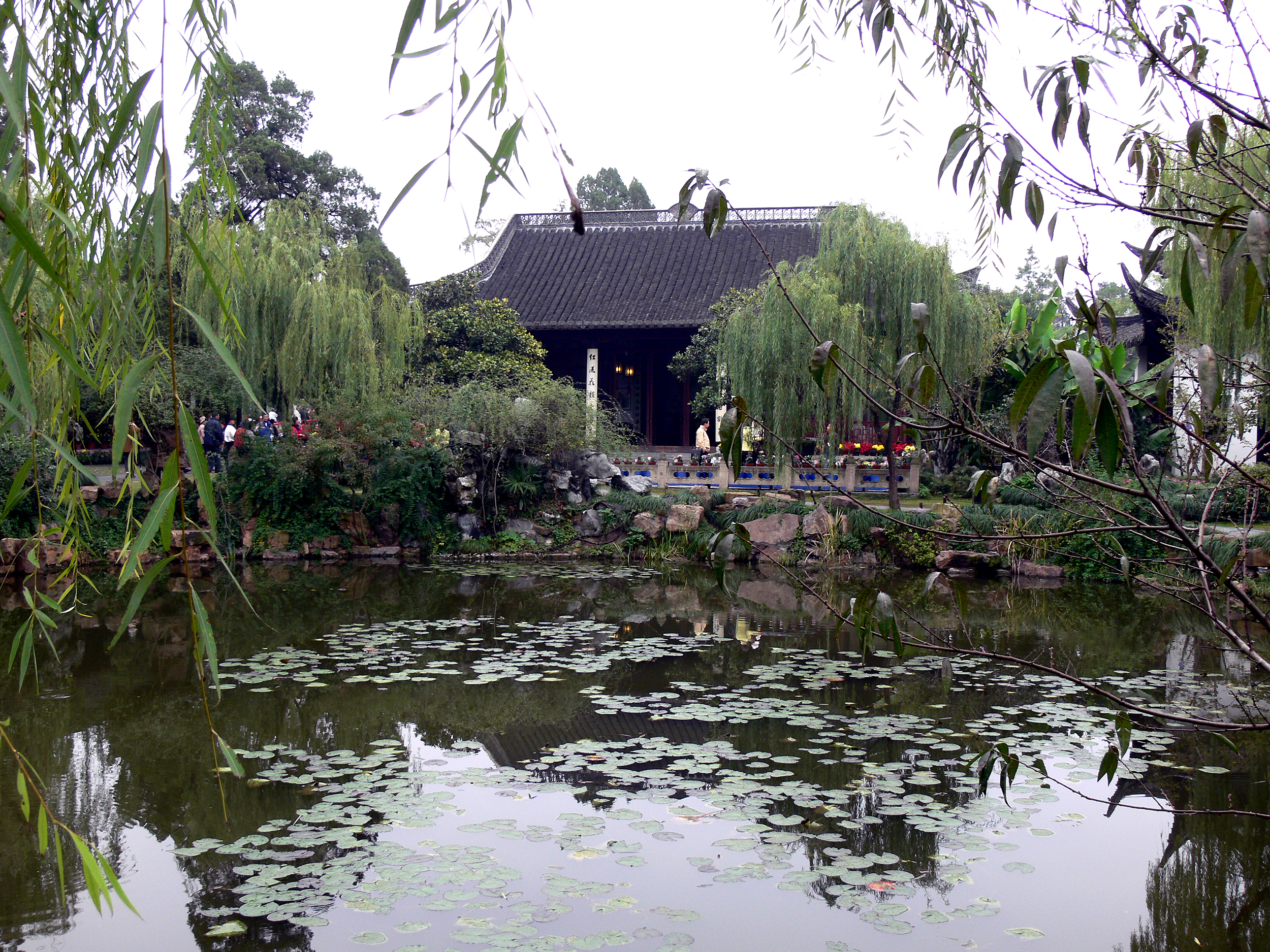
A lotus pond in the garden

The park is noted for the attractive woodwork in its traditional pavilions. These include the Hall of Listening to Orioles (t 聽鸝館, s 听鹂馆, Tīnglí Guǎn), named for the singing venue in the Old Summer Palace, itself named for various Tang poems by Du Fu. Two iron cauldrons sit before it, each weighing about 3 metric tons (3.3 short tons) and dating to the 6th-century Xiao Liang dynasty. The nearby pond is large by the standards of classical Chinese gardens.

Xu Garden is also the location of the vantage point for Four Bridges in Misty Rain (t 四橋煙雨樓, s 四桥烟雨楼, Sìqiáo Yānyǔ Lóu), one of the 24 views of Yangzhou under the Qing. The four bridges are the Five-Pavilion or Lotus Bridge, the Rainbow Bridge (t 大虹橋, s 大虹桥, Dà Hóng Qiáo), the Spring Wave Bridge (t 春波橋, s 春波桥, Chūnbō Qiáo), and the Long Spring Bridge (t 長春橋, s 长春桥, Chángchūn Qiáo).

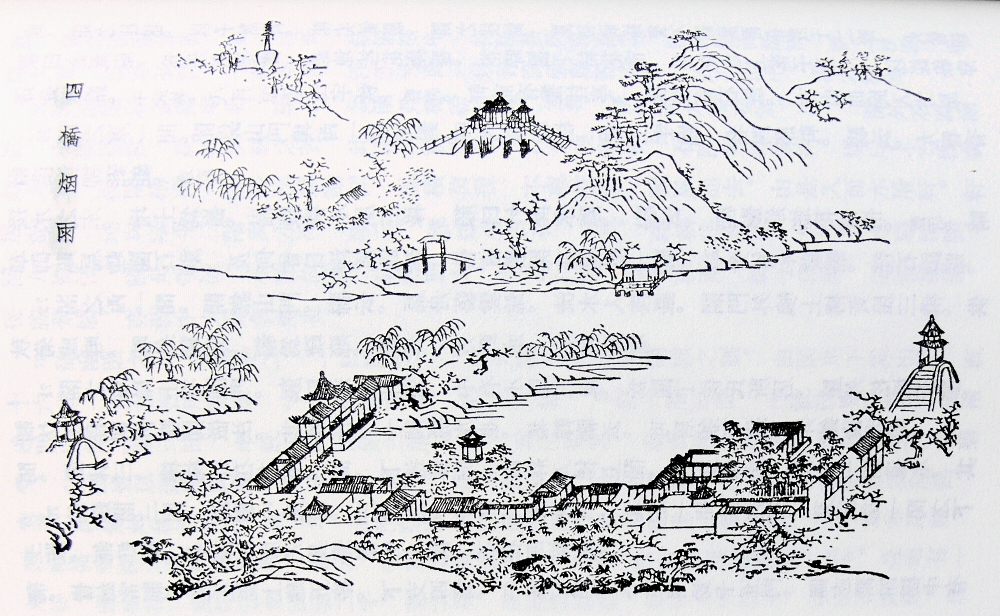
An ink sketch of the Four Bridges under the Qing

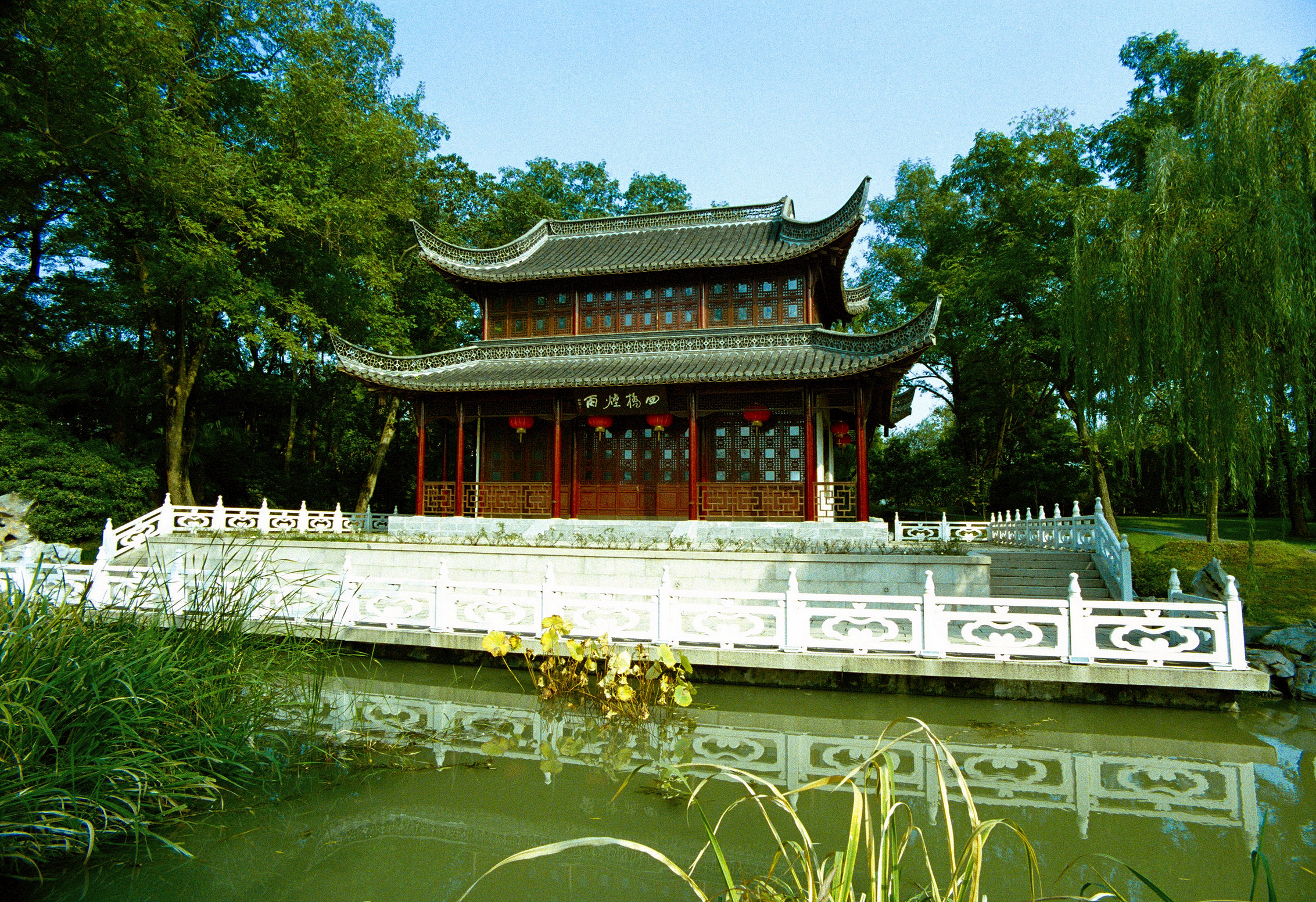
The designated building for the view

Ye Forest (叶林, Yè Lín) or Ye Garden (t 叶園, s 叶园, Yè Yuán) is also included under the garden's administration. Covering 4.8 hectares (12 acres), it was created by Ye Xiufeng in 1927 as a private garden for his father, the teacher Ye Weishan. It is principally covered in cedar and cypress.

== See also ==
- Xu Garden (煦园) beside the Presidential Palace in Nanjing, Jiangsu, China
- List of Major National Historical and Cultural Sites in Jiangsu
