= Lianxing Temple =

Buddhist temple in Yangzhou, Jiangsu, China

- 莲性寺
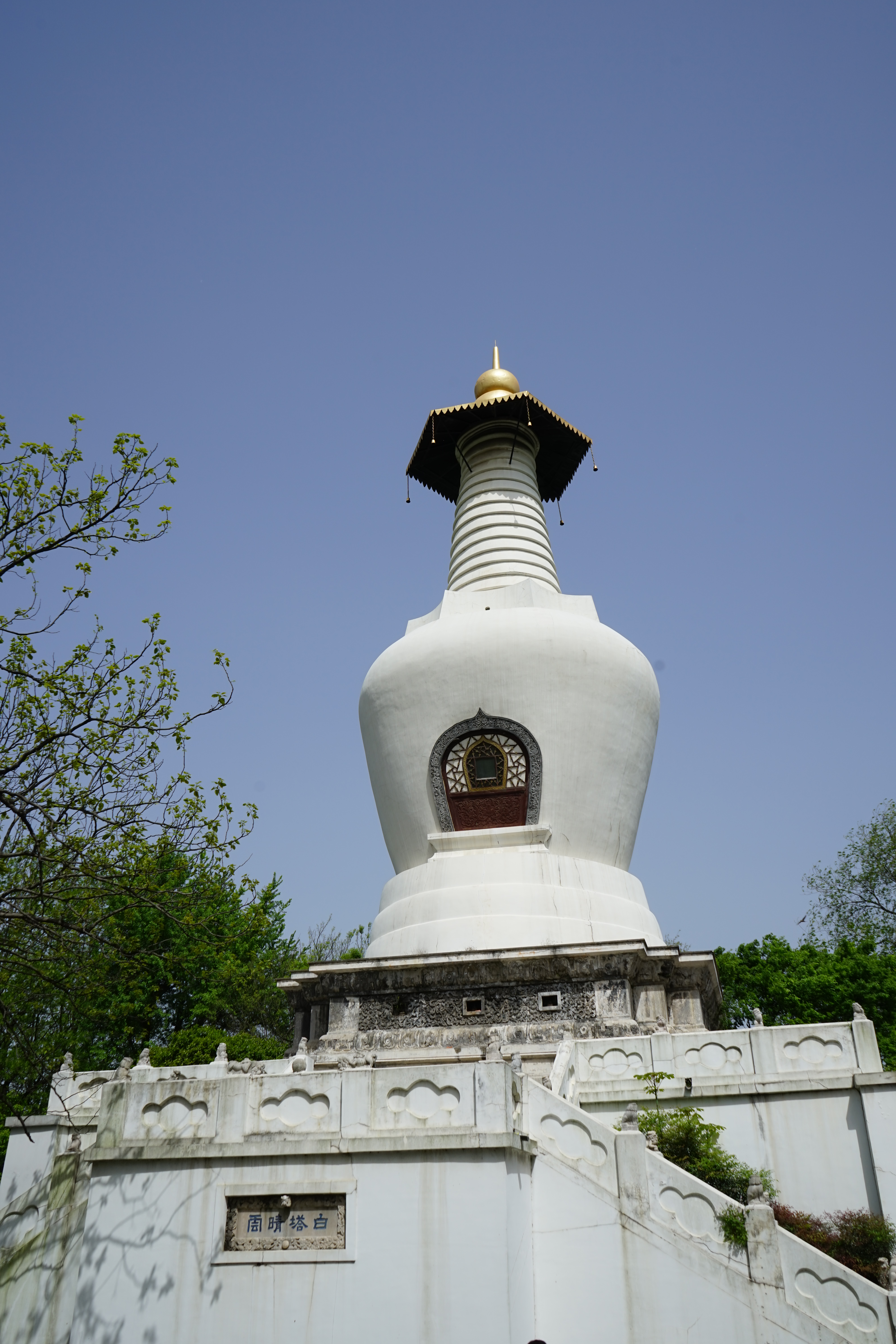
- The White Dagoba at Lianxing Temple

Religion
- Affiliation: Buddhism

Location
- Location: Yangzhou, Jiangsu
- Country: China
- Interactive map of Lianxing Temple
- Coordinates: 32°24′32″N 119°24′58″E

Lianxing Temple
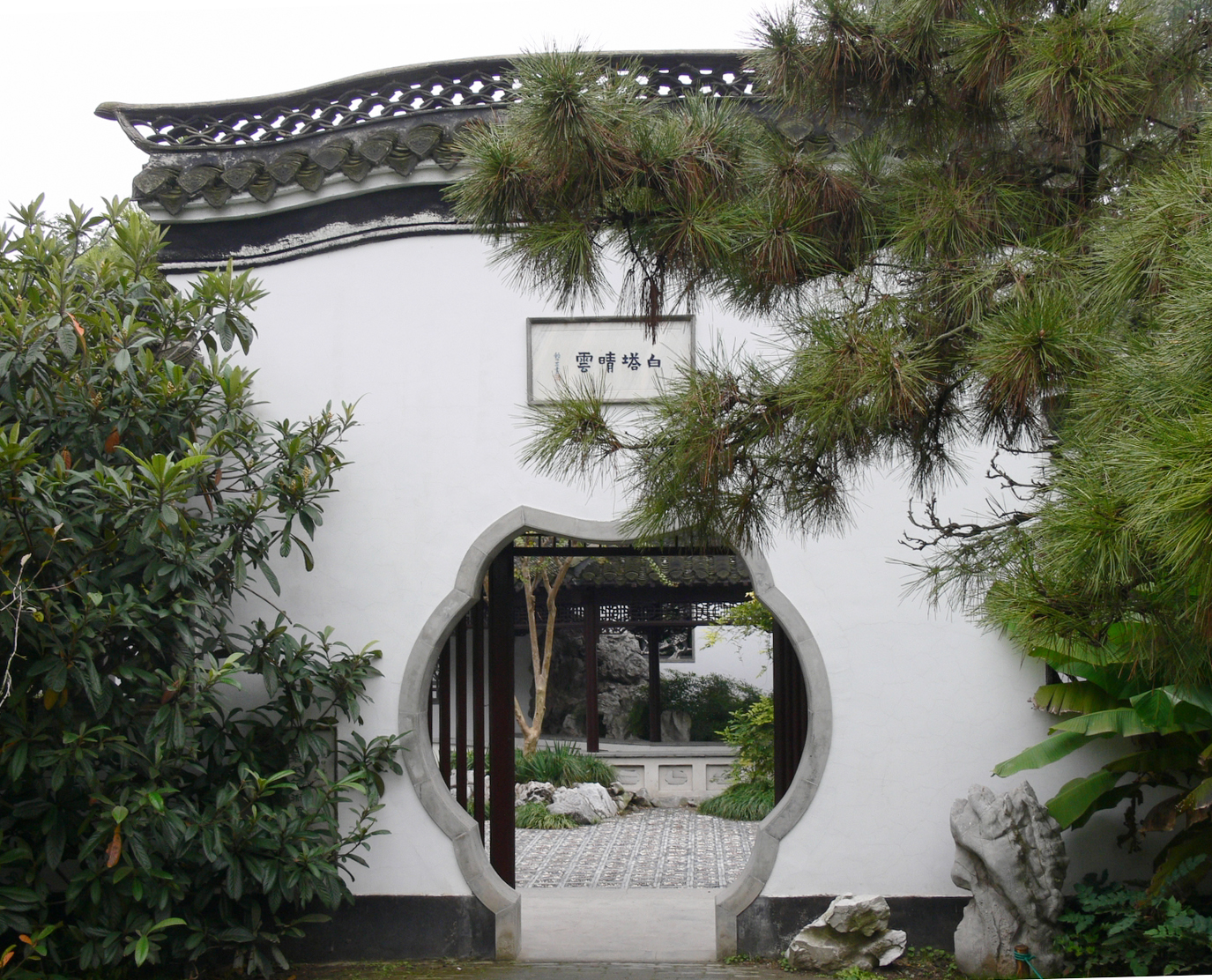
- Garden entrance at the temple
- Traditional Chinese: 蓮性寺
- Simplified Chinese: 莲性寺
- Literal meaning: Lotus Mind Temple
Transcriptions
Standard Mandarin
- Hanyu Pinyin: Liánxìng Sì
- Wade–Giles: Lien-hsing Ssu

Fahai Temple
- Chinese: 法海寺
- Literal meaning: Temple of the Sea of Law
Transcriptions
Standard Mandarin
- Hanyu Pinyin: Fǎhǎi Sì
- Wade–Giles: Fa-hai Ssu

The Lianxing Temple, also known as the Fahai Temple and by other names, is a Buddhist temple in Yangzhou, Jiangsu, China. It is located on a small island south of the central stretch of the Slender West Lake Scenic Area near the Five-Pavilion Bridge and is primarily known for its Tibetan-style dagoba.

== Names ==
"Lianxing Temple" is a partial calque of the temple's Chinese name, written 蓮性寺 in traditional characters and 莲性寺 in simplified ones. Liánxìng is the pinyin romanization of the first two characters. In full translation, it is also known as the "Temple of the Lotus Mind" or "Lotus Spirit Temple". It was originally known as the Fahai Temple (法海寺, Fǎhǎi Sì) or the "Temple of the Sea of Dharma".

Its dagoba is known as the White Dagoba, Stupa, or Pagoda, a calque of its Chinese name 蓮性寺白塔 or 莲性寺白塔, Liánxìngsì Báitǎ.

== History ==
The Fahai Temple was first established in the 13th or 14th century under the Yuan dynasty. It was renamed the Lianxing Temple in the 17th or 18th century under the Kangxi Emperor of the Qing. Chinese paintings of Yangzhou during the 18th century make it clear that the temple complex's main entrance shifted from its east side, where it was more convenient for the city's foot traffic, to the west, where the island's main wharf was located, showing the increased use of boats on the Slender West Lake after it was thoroughly dredged for the Qianlong Emperor's repeated visits.

The temple's dagoba self-consciously mirrored the White Dagoba in Beijing, combining with the later Five-Pavilion Bridge to emulate the capital's Beihai Park. As the "White Tower against Oncoming Clouds" (t 白塔晴雲, s 白塔晴云, Báitǎ Qíngyún) it was reckoned as one of the 24 Views of Yangzhou under the Qing. Details of the construction of the tower have not survived, but numerous legends have arisen to fill the void. Most commonly, one of the town's rich salt merchants is said to have erected one in salt overnight to please the Qianlong Emperor during his second tour of Jiangnan in 1757 and others later replaced it with one in brick and plaster. In another, a group of merchants did so on the advice of one of the emperor's eunuchs, only to be extorted by the jealous eunuch into building a permanent structure. In a third, the merchant Jiang Chun (江春, Jiāng Chūn) voluntarily paid one or more of the emperor's attendants to get a sketch of the Beijing dagoba, enabling his workers to erect a full replica overnight. Most fancifully, historians of the 1920s combined local legends with passages from Marco Polo's Travels to claim the "wine bottle" pagoda was a thousand years old and had been erected by the Iranic Alans. In fact, the dagoba existed at least as far back as the Kangxi Emperor, though probably little earlier. It was rebuilt under the Qianlong Emperor, but in 1784 for his 6th and final southern tour.

The Lianxing Temple was badly damaged during the Taiping Rebellion when Yangzhou fell to the rebels in 1853. The dagoba, however, was preserved and even covered with scaffolding to make it more functional as a watchtower.

The temple was ultimately rebuilt, with its monks residing in a three-story building behind the main shrine. The present temple, however, is considered small and primarily for the benefit of tourists as the dagoba has become a famous landmark for the city. It was protected by the Yangzhou municipal government in 2002. The temple's White Dagoba was inscribed along with the nearby Five-Pavilion Bridge as the 533rd Major Cultural Heritage Site under National-Level Protection added during the 6th round of nominations on 25 May 2006.

== Structure ==
The White Dagoba is 28.5 meters (94 ft) tall.

== See also ==
- List of Major National Historical and Cultural Sites in Jiangsu
- List of Buddhist temples in the People's Republic of China
- Beihai Park in Beijing
