= Hehuachi Park =

Park in Yangzhou, Jiangsu, China

Coordinates: 32°23′3″N 119°25′27″E

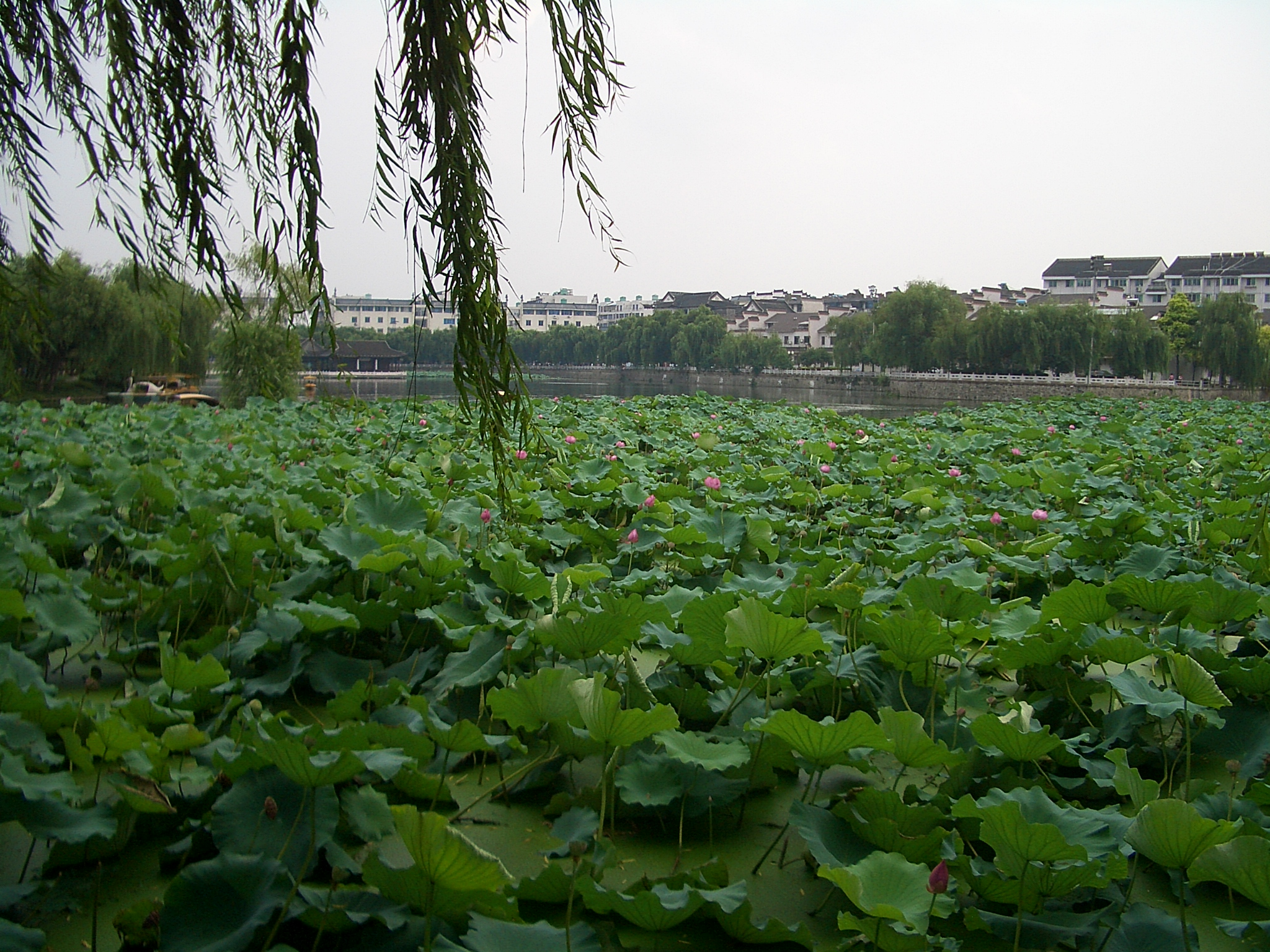
The Lotus Flower Pond (Hehuachi)

Hehuachi Park (Chinese: 荷花池公园; pinyin: Héhuāchí Gōngyuán; lit. 'Lotus Pond Park') is a small park in Yangzhou, Jiangsu province, China. The park's centerpiece is the Hehuachi, or Lotus Pond.

Hehuachi Park's history can be traced back to the Ming and Qing Dynasties. The park plays an important role in the daily life of Yangzhou people, providing a quiet environment for people's recreation. The park is open to visitors free of charge.

== Introduction ==
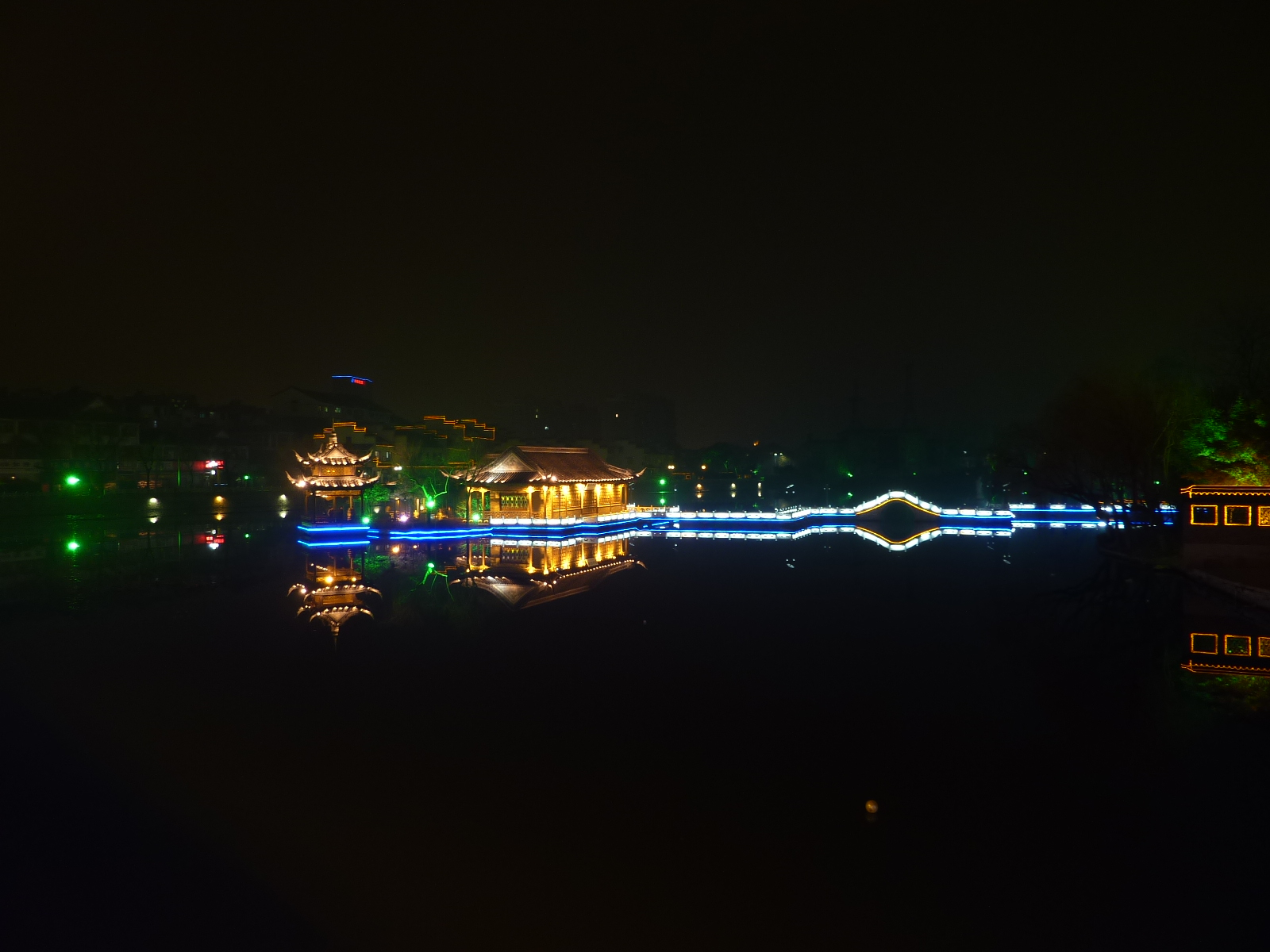
A night view of the Hehua Pond

Hehuachi Park is located at the southwestern corner of Yangzhou's historic center (formerly, the walled city). The park occupies an area of 11 ha, including 5 ha of water.

Hehuachi is part of Yangzhou's intricate network of lakes and canals. The Erdaohe (二道河) Canal, running along the western edge of Yangzhou's old city, comes to the Hehua Pond from the north, connecting it with the Thin West Lake at the city's northwest. The short (300-meter long) Erdaogou (二道沟) Canal runs east from the Hehua Pond, linking it with the nearby old channel of the Grand Canal of China, which forms the old city's southern and eastern borders. It is possible to sail a small water craft from the Thin West Lake, via the Erdaohe, the Hehua Pond, and the Erdaogou into the Old Grand Canal.

The park is a combination of modern style and the traditional style as a park in the city. It was regarded as the second rank garden of Jiangsu for the first batch. Its original names are Nanchi and Yanchi. Because there are many lotuses planted in the pond, then it was renamed as Hehuachi park. Hehuachi is one of the most eight famous scenic garden spots of Yangzhou. The scenes where the garden overlooks Inkslab Pool with Wenfeng tower on the other side, is titled of "Yanchi Ranhan".

== History ==
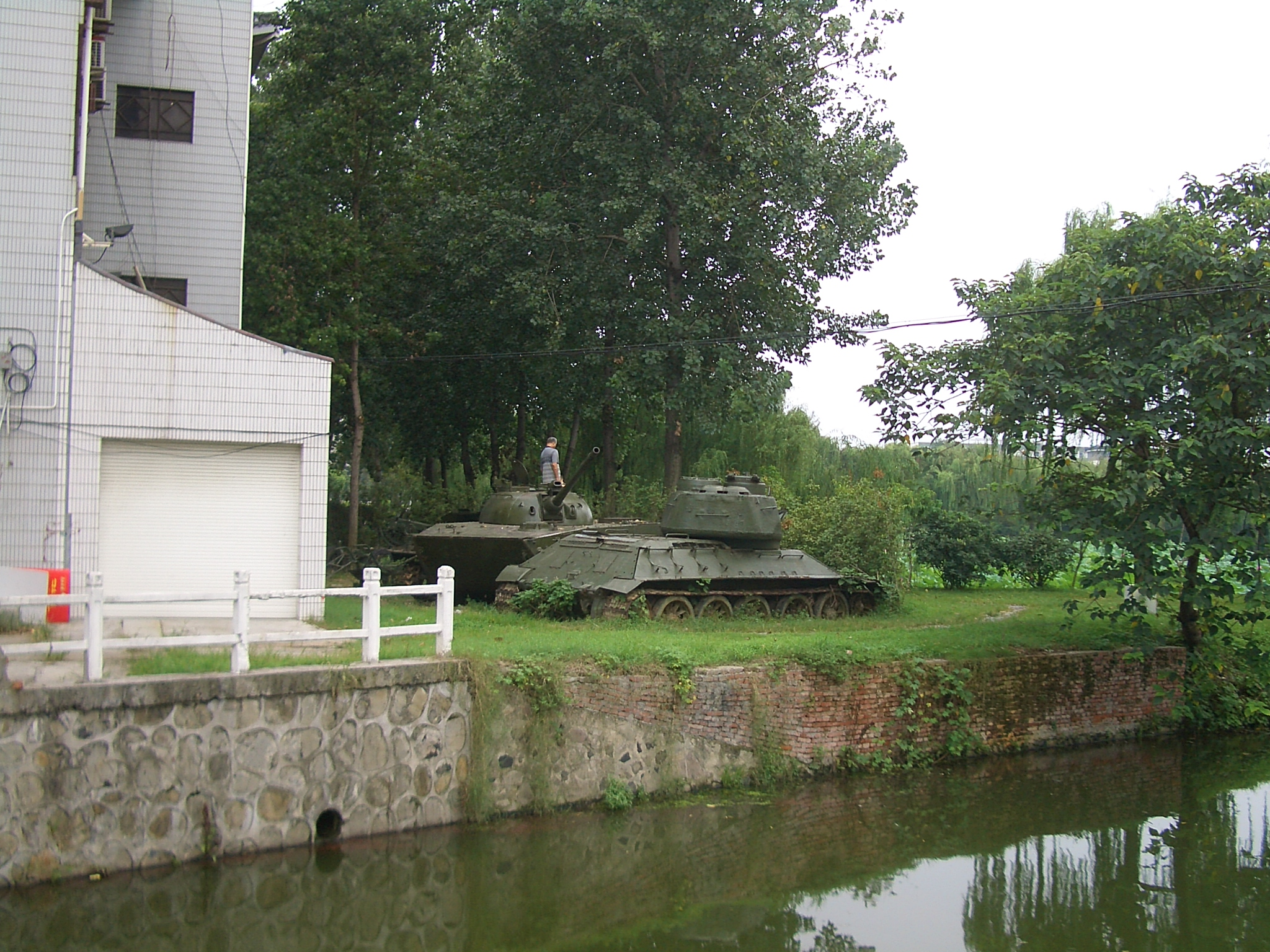
In a quiet corner of the park

The owner of the Garden brought in many precious rocks from lake Taihu in the past, some of those rocks were very big, and others were quite small. It is said that those rocks were the remains of the Huashi Gang of the Song dynasty. The owner placed those beautiful rocks together as man-made hills to decorate the Garden. With those rare artificial hills, the park took on a fantastic view.

Additionally, the whole park were surrounded by different kinds of green trees. Inside the park, there were several flower houses built. A great variety of flowers were planted in those houses and they bloomed throughout the seasons. The whole park is filled with sweet fragrance . In spring, the rhododendron, the camellia and the jasmine were planted in the flower house; in summer, the broad-leaved epiphyllum, the lotus and the oleander, and so on, were planted in it; in autumn, the sweet-scented osmanthus and the chrysanthemum were cultivated in the flower rooms, besides the wintersweet and cypress which were cold-resistant were cultivated in winter. Inside the flower house were arranged small artificial hills, with a pool next to them, and springs would trickle down from the hills. It took on lively pictures.

However, in the late Ming dynasty and early Qing dynasty, the park has Ying garden and Jiufeng garden. After the war, it was badly destroyed. At the beginning of the 1990s, the main problems of Hehua pond park surroundings are "dirty, disorder, low and wet".

== Reconstruction ==
In order to improve the environment, the city government decided to use the advantages of the Hehua pond's topography for the construction of the whole park. In 1981, the water park was being built at the north of Hehua pond, namely Hehuachi Park. A few years later, the classical styles of garden group, such as Yanchi Ranhan and Jiufeng Stone, together with the revetments of Hehua pond and outdoor swimming pool were finished. It looked like a half-bird. In 1997, the park was completely opened to the public. The reconstruction of park changed greatly to the southwest appearance of the city. The park has become an ideal place for leisure, entertainment and exercise site for people there.
