= Mao Renfeng =

Chinese spymaster

Mao Renfeng 毛人鳳
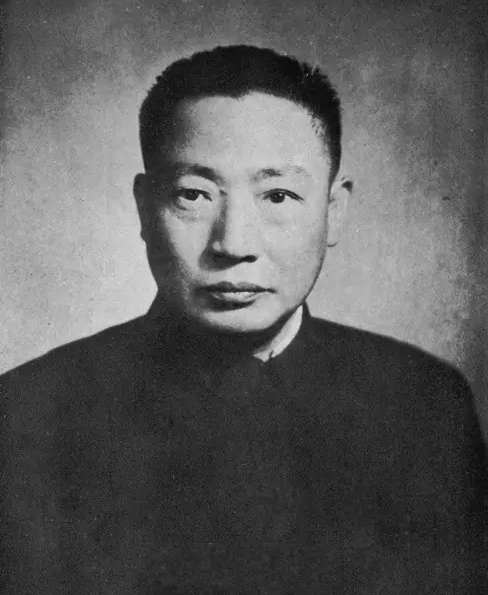

Director of the Bureau of Investigation and Statistics
- In office 17 March 1946 – 11 December 1956
- President: Chiang Kai-shek
- Preceded by: Dai Li

Personal details
- Born: 5 January 1898 Hecun, Jiangshan, Zhejiang, Qing dynasty China
- Died: 11 December 1956 (aged 58) Taipei, Taiwan
- Children: Robert Yu-Lang Mao
- Occupation: Intelligence Chief, Spymaster

Military service
- Allegiance: Republic of China
- Years of service: 1925–1956
- Rank: General 2nd rank (posthumous)
- Battles/wars: Second Sino-Japanese War; World War II; Chinese Civil War

Mao Renfeng (Chinese: 毛人鳳; Wade–Giles: Mao Jên-fêng; 5 January 1898 – 11 December 1956) was a Republic of China general and spymaster who headed the Bureau of Investigation and Statistics (BIS, also known as the Counterintelligence Bureau and, after 1955, the Intelligence Bureau) from 1946 until his death, succeeding his childhood friend Dai Li, who died in a plane crash in 1946. Between 1946 and 1949, his spy agency played a prominent role in the Chinese Civil War. In 1949, he fled to Taiwan with the rest of the Nationalist government, where he died 7 years later.

The CIA reported Mao Renfeng and general Tang Enbo, among other loyalists of Chiang Kai-shek, to have convened with the Generalissimo in Kaohsiung on 20 June 1949. More than two years later, a report was furnished to the CIA with the following content:

1. Chiang Ching-kuo's Political Department (Note: Now the Political Warfare Bureau.) and Mao Renfeng's Secrets Bureau are engaged in a bitter struggle for supremacy.

2. The Political Department is now the most powerful organization on Taiwan since it has most of the funds and experienced men from the former Dai Li Organization, Secrets Bureau, San Min Chu I [Youth Corps], and Youth Army. The Department has been successful in propaganda and intelligence work on Taiwan, but its intelligence service in Communist China is weak.

3. The Secrets Bureau, weakened by the loss of men to the Political Department, is attempting to use its guerrilla force to build up a third force in order to break the Chiang family's control of the government. In an attempt to overthrow Chiang Ching-kuo, again Mao Renfeng and Mao Sen are working together secretly in an effort to secure U.S. backing for a third force. With such backing, the Secrets Bureau hopes to regain its prestige. Colonel Li Long is acting as liaison between the Maos.

4. While Madame Chiang appears to be backing Mao Renfeng in his guerrilla activities, it is not likely that she is aware of his actions relative to a third force.

5. Mao Renfeng is a bitter enemy of Chiang Ching-kuo and takes every opportunity to denounce him to the Americans. He is quoted as having said that if Chiang Ching-kuo controls Taiwan for 30 years, it will be like the USSR. In addition, the Secrets Bureau is trying to use political pressure to cut down Chiang Wei-kuo's Armored Force. It is backing a plan to distribute armored force units throughout the Army so that they will be controlled by the Army and not by Chiang Wei-kuo. At present, Chiang often ignores important orders from Army Headquarters.

6. According to many Nationalist officials, the Secrets Bureau is deliberately promoting friction between the two leading factions in the Army. These factions are led by Chiang Wei-kuo and Sun Liren.

Beginning on 25 May 1955, Mao's BIS secret agents, in conjunction with political warfare officers and military police, began arresting and torturing the subordinates of General Sun Li-jen for being pro-American in an alleged coup against Chiang Kai-shek's regime, for collaborating with the Central Intelligence Agency to take control of Taiwan, and for declaring Taiwanese independence; by October, more than 300 officers had been arrested and detained by the BIS and the Taiwan Garrison Command on charges of high treason for conspiring with Communist spies to stage a coup. General Sun was also placed under house arrest for 33 years until 20 March 1988, which was one of the cases of political persecution in the history of the White Terror.

His son, Robert Yu-Lang Mao, is currently chairman of Hewlett-Packard China.
