= Ye Xiufeng =

Chinese politician (1900–1990)

Ye Xiufeng 葉秀峯
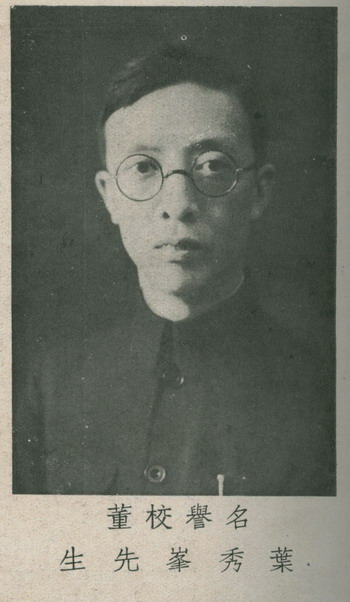
- Born: 1900; Jiangdu, Jiangsu, Qing Empire
- Died: 8 February 1990 (aged 89–90); Taipei, Taiwan
- Political party: Kuomintang

Ye Xiufeng (Chinese: 葉秀峯; pinyin: Yè Xiùfēng; 1900 – 8 February 1990) was a Kuomintang politician of the Republic of China.

== Early life and family origins ==
Ye was born in 1900 in Jiangdu, a district of Yangzhou, in Jiangsu Province under the late Qing dynasty. His father was Ye Weishan (zh: 葉惟善), a Yangzhou teacher.

== Biography ==
Ye Xiufeng was a member of the CC Clique of the Kuomintang. He was acquainted with Chiang Kai-shek and Chen Lifu via his education at the Whampoa Military Academy. After graduating, he pursued a master's degree from the University of Pittsburgh, graduating in 1925.

== Legacy ==
Ye created Ye Forest as a private garden for his father in 1927. It now forms part of Xu Garden at Yangzhou's Slender West Lake.
