= Beihai Park =

Imperial park in Beijing, China

Coordinates: 39°55′28″N 116°22′59″E

- 北海公园
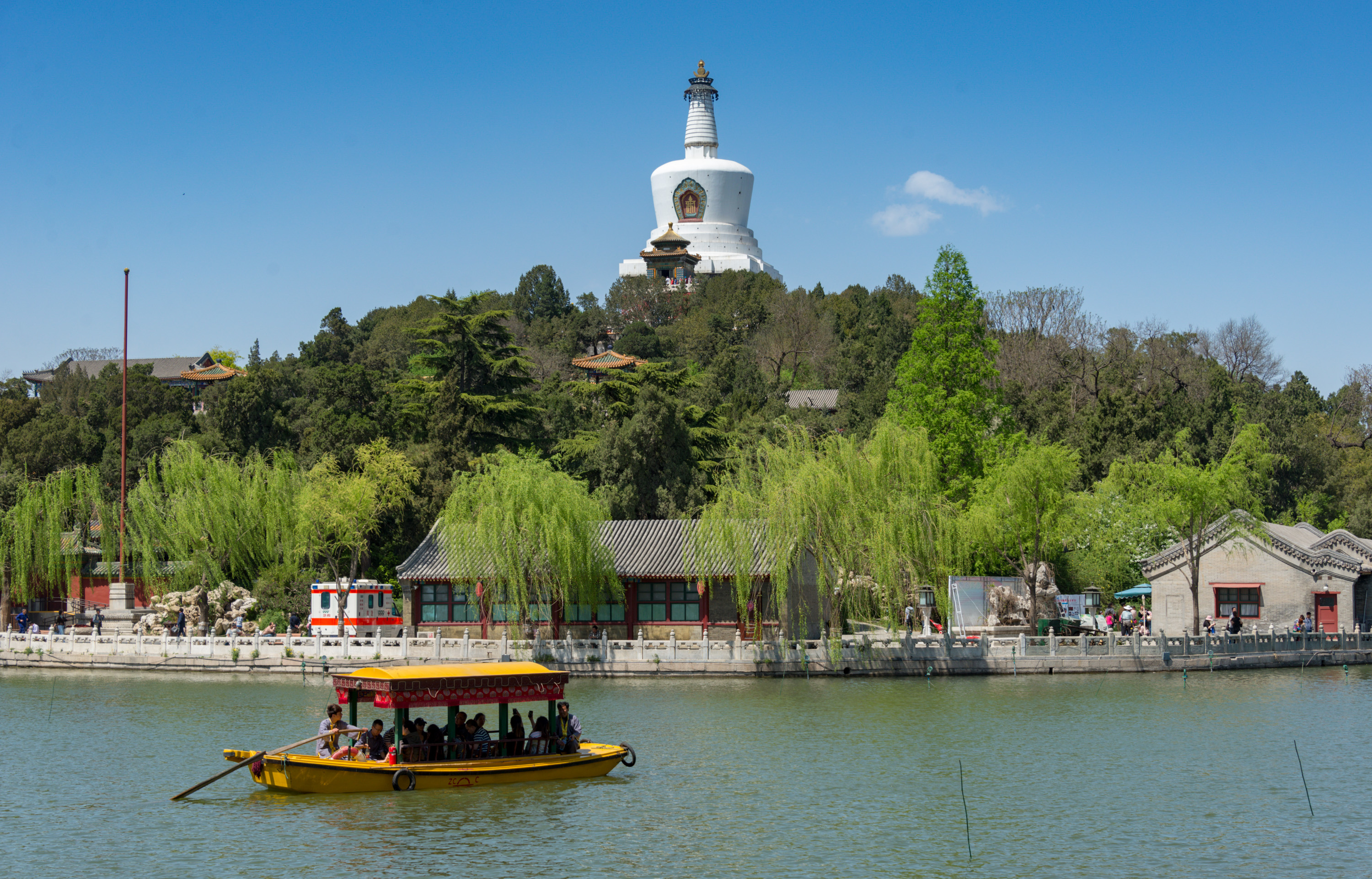
- The White Dagoba (a stupa) on Jade Flower Island

- Location within Beijing Location within China
- Type: Urban park
- Location: Beijing, China
- Area: 71 hectares (180 acres)
- Created: 1179 (first park); 1925 (modern park)
- Owner: Beijing Municipal Administration Center of Parks
- Status: Open all year

Beihai Park
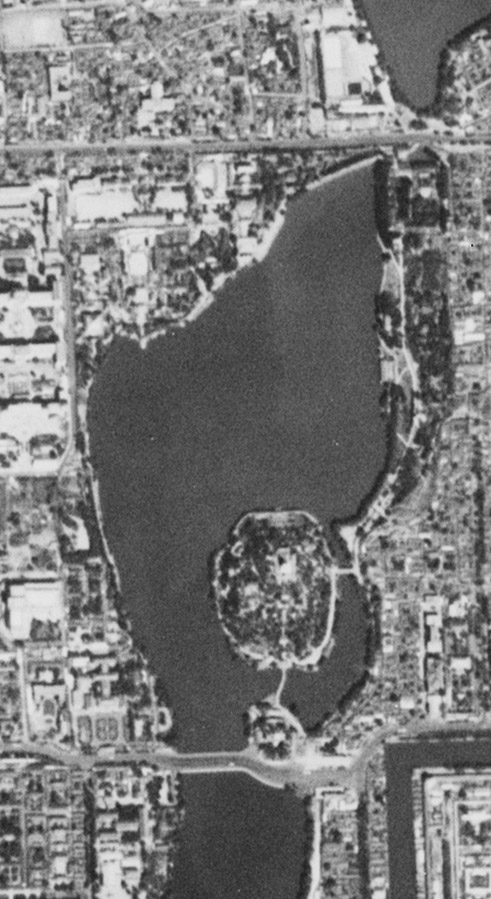
- Satellite image of Beihai Park (1967)
- Traditional Chinese: 北海公園
- Simplified Chinese: 北海公园
- Literal meaning: "Public Park of the Northern Sea"
Transcriptions
Standard Mandarin
- Hanyu Pinyin: Běihǎi Gōngyuán
- Wade–Giles: Pei^{3}-hai^{3} Kung^{1}-yüan^{2}
- IPA: [pèɪxàɪ kʊ́ŋ.ɥɛ̌n]

Beihai Park is a public park and former imperial garden immediately northwest of the Forbidden City in Beijing, China.

First built in the 12th century, Beihai is among the largest of all surviving Chinese gardens and contains numerous historically important structures, palaces, and temples. Once part of the Imperial City, it has been open to the public since 1925. As with many of Chinese imperial gardens, Beihai was designed to imitate renowned scenic spots and architecture from various regions of China, particularly Jiangnan around the Yangtze Delta. Various aspects of the park evoke the elaborate pavilions and canals of Hangzhou and Yangzhou, the delicate gardens of Suzhou, and the natural scenery around Lake Tai with its famously porous stones. Beihai Park itself is now reckoned one of the masterpieces of Chinese gardening and landscaping.

The present park has an area of around 71 hectares (180 acres) with a lake that covers more than half of its area. At its center is Jade Flower Island (t 瓊華島, s 琼华岛, Qiónghuádǎo), whose highest point is 32 meters (105 ft). The park's lake is connected at its northern end to the Shichahai.

== Name ==
"Beihai" is the pinyin romanization of the Mandarin pronunciation of the garden's Chinese name, 北海, meaning "Northern Sea". The name corresponds to the "Central Sea" (中海, Zhōnghǎi) and "Southern Sea" (南海, Nánhǎi) immediately to the park's south, still used—under the combined name Zhongnanhai—as the restricted headquarters of China's paramount leaders.

== History ==
In 1179, Emperor Zhangzong of the Jurchen Jin dynasty had a country resort built northeast of Zhongdu, his empire's central capital located in what is now southwestern Beijing. Taiye Lake was excavated along the Jinshui River and the Palace of Great Peace (t 大寧宮, s 大宁宫, Dàníng Gōng) was erected on Jade Flower Island in the lake.

During the reign of Kublai Khan of the Mongol Yuan dynasty, the island was redesigned by various architects and officials including Liu Bingzhong, Guo Shoujing, and Amir al-Din. Taiye Lake was enclosed within the walls of the Imperial City of the Yuan Empire's new capital Khanbaliq.

The Ming dynasty was initially based at Nanjing but moved to Beijing under the Yongle Emperor, with construction of his palace complex beginning in 1406. At this time, Taiye Lake was divided by bridges into three lakes described as the "Northern", "Central", and "Southern Seas". These lakes formed part of an extensive royal estate within the Imperial City called the Western Garden (西苑, Xīyuàn).

In 1747, the Qianlong Emperor ordered that three rare calligraphy works made by Wang Xizhi, Wang Xianzhi, and Wang Xun then housed within the Hall of Mental Cultivation along with 134 other calligraphic works from the Imperial Collection were to be carved into stone and displayed at the Pavilion of Reviewing the Past beside Beihai.

== Notable places ==
Beihai Park includes several Buddhist temples within its grounds, including the Temple of Everlasting Peace (永安寺, Yǒng'ān Sì) and the Chanfu Temple.

The White Dagoba or Pagoda (白塔, Báitǎ) is a Tibetan-style stupa placed on the highest point on Jade Flower Island, built to honor the visit of the 5th Dalai Lama in 1651. It is 40 meters (131 ft) high and made of white stone. It houses reliquaries with Buddhist scriptures, monks' robes and alms bowls, and relics, the ash and bones of monks left after their cremation. Sun, moon, and flame engravings decorate the surface of the tower. Destroyed by the 1679 Sanhe-Pinggu earthquake, it was rebuilt the following year. Damage from the 1976 Tangshan earthquake was repaired the same year.

On the lake's north bank lies the Five Dragon Pavilions, five connected pavilions with spires and pointed upswept eaves, built under the Ming.

The Nine-Dragon Wall lies north of the Five Dragon Pavilions. It was built in 1402 and is one of three walls of its kind in China. It is made of glazed bricks in seven colors. Nine complete dragons playing in the clouds decorate both sides of the wall.

Many smaller gardens exist throughout the park. The Jingxin or Quieting Heart Room is a garden on the north bank that covers more than 4,000 square meters (43,056 sq ft).

The Hall of Received Light (Chengguangdian) is the main structure in the Round City (t 團城, s 团城, Tuánchéng). It is a spacious building with a double-eaved roof made of yellow glazed tiles bordered in green. Inside there is a Buddha that is 1.6 meters (5 ft 3 in) tall, which was presented to the Guangxu Emperor of the Qing by a Khmer king. It is carved from a single piece of pure white jade inlaid with precious stones. The Eight-Nation Alliance damaged the statue's left arm during the 1900 Battle of Beijing.

The Taihu rocks in Beihai Park were shipped from Henan Province. There are also various pieces of art ranging from Yuan jade jars to a collection of 495 centuries-old stelas.

== Legacy ==
The Five-Pavilion Bridge and Lotus Tower in Yangzhou's Slender West Lake Scenic Area were self-consciously modeled on Beihai Park's Five Dragon Pavilions and White Dagoba to curry favor with the Kangxi and Qianlong Emperors during their southern tours of Jiangnan in the 18th century.

== Gallery ==
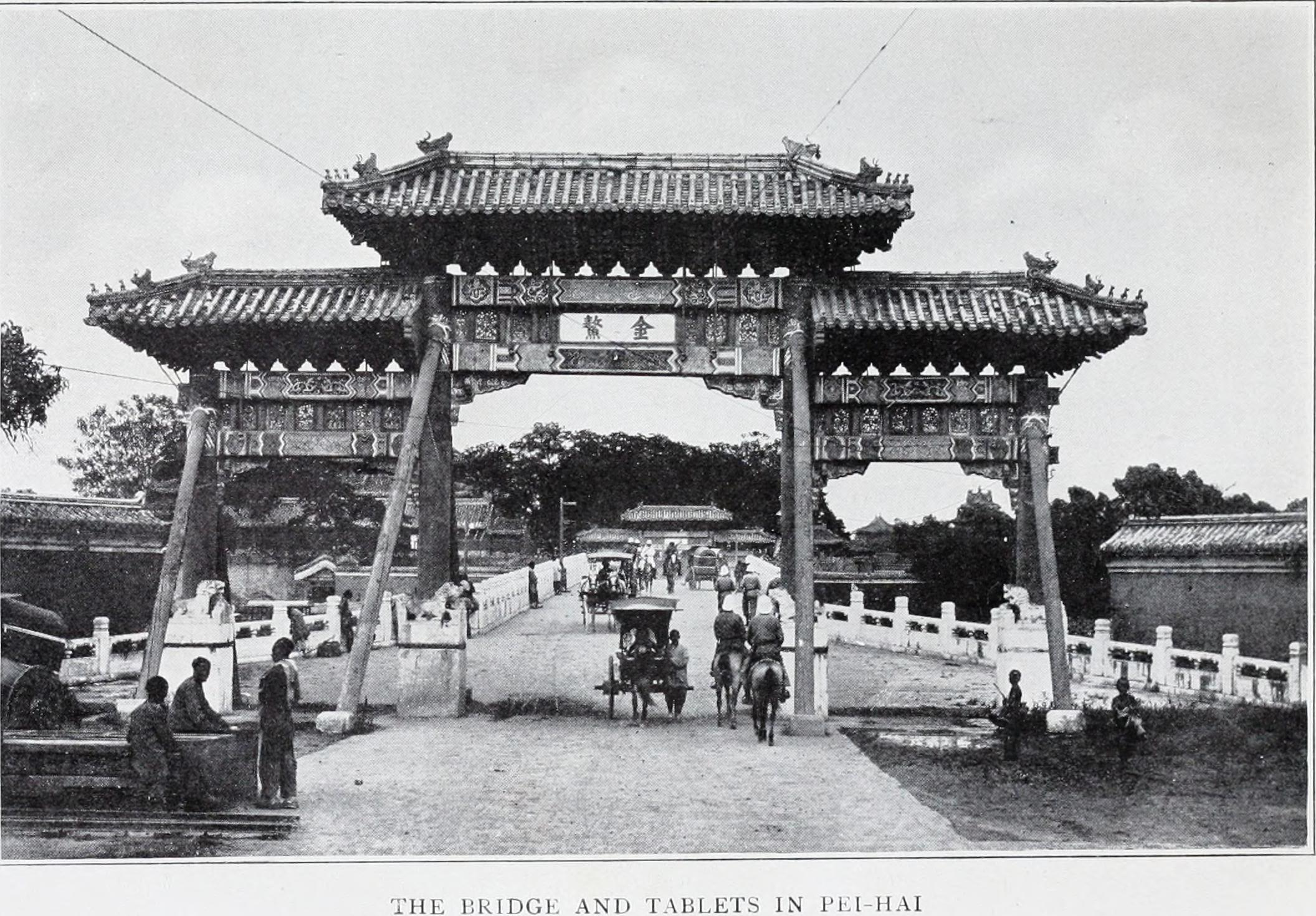
The park bridge in 1910

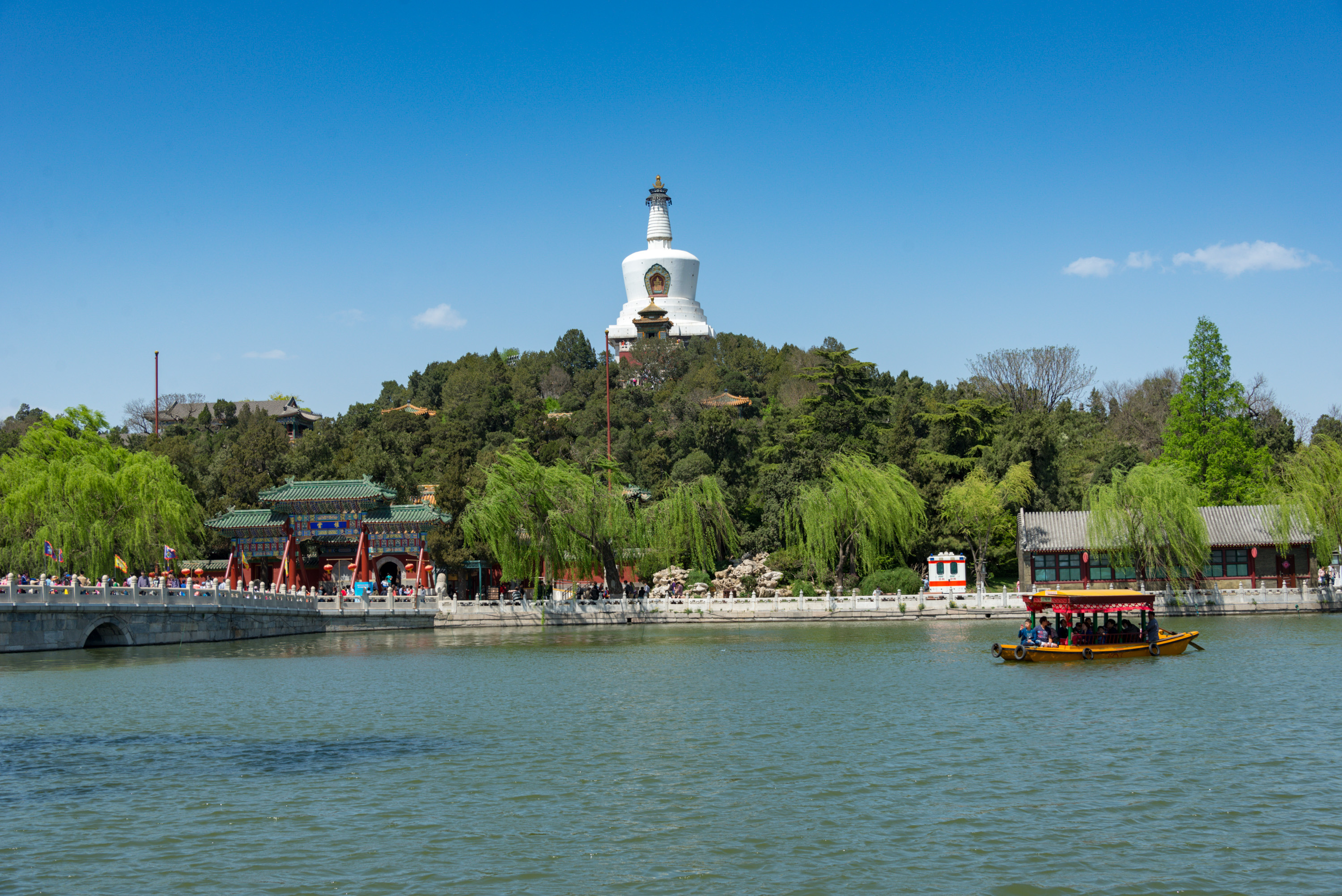
Jade Flower Island

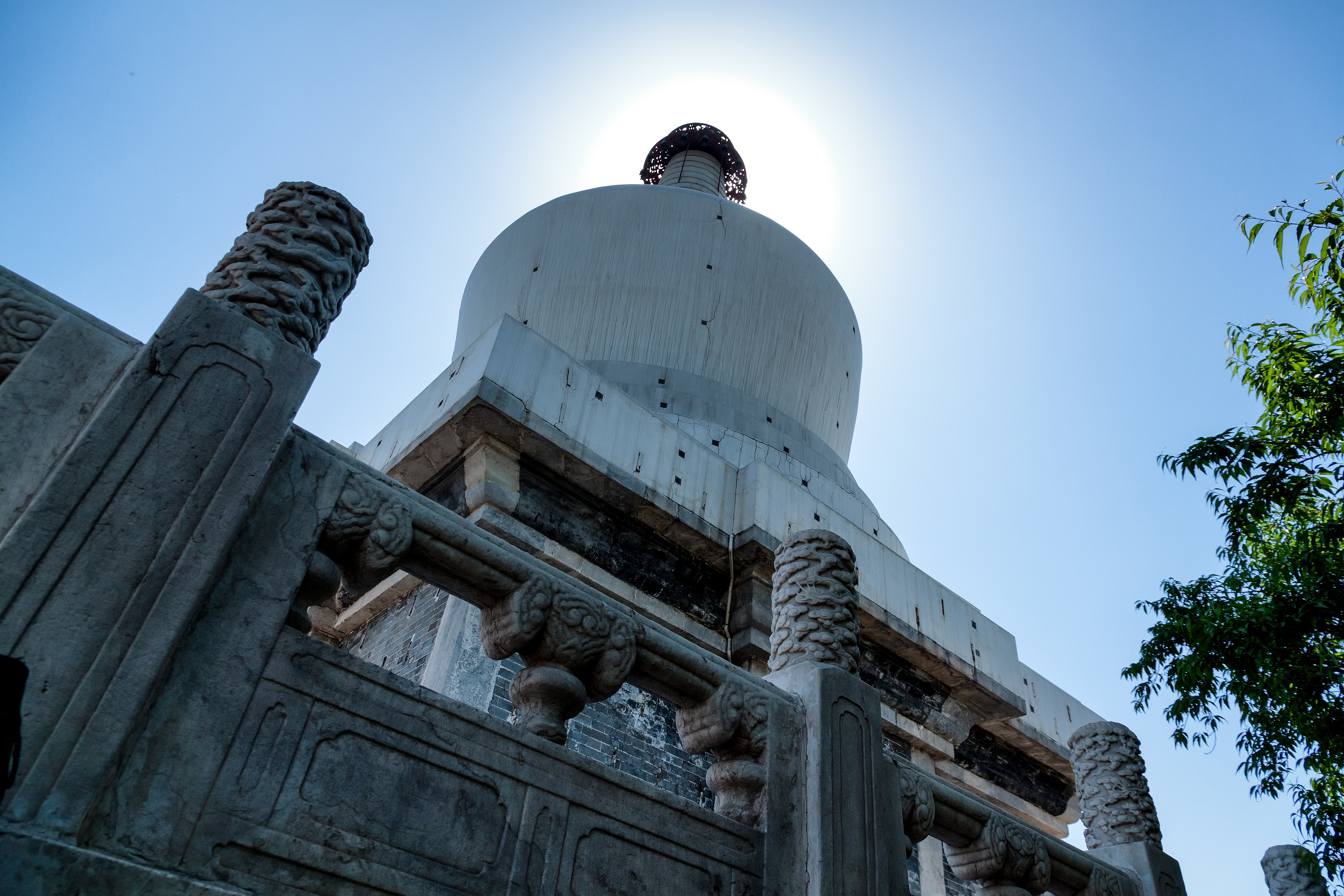
The White Dagoba

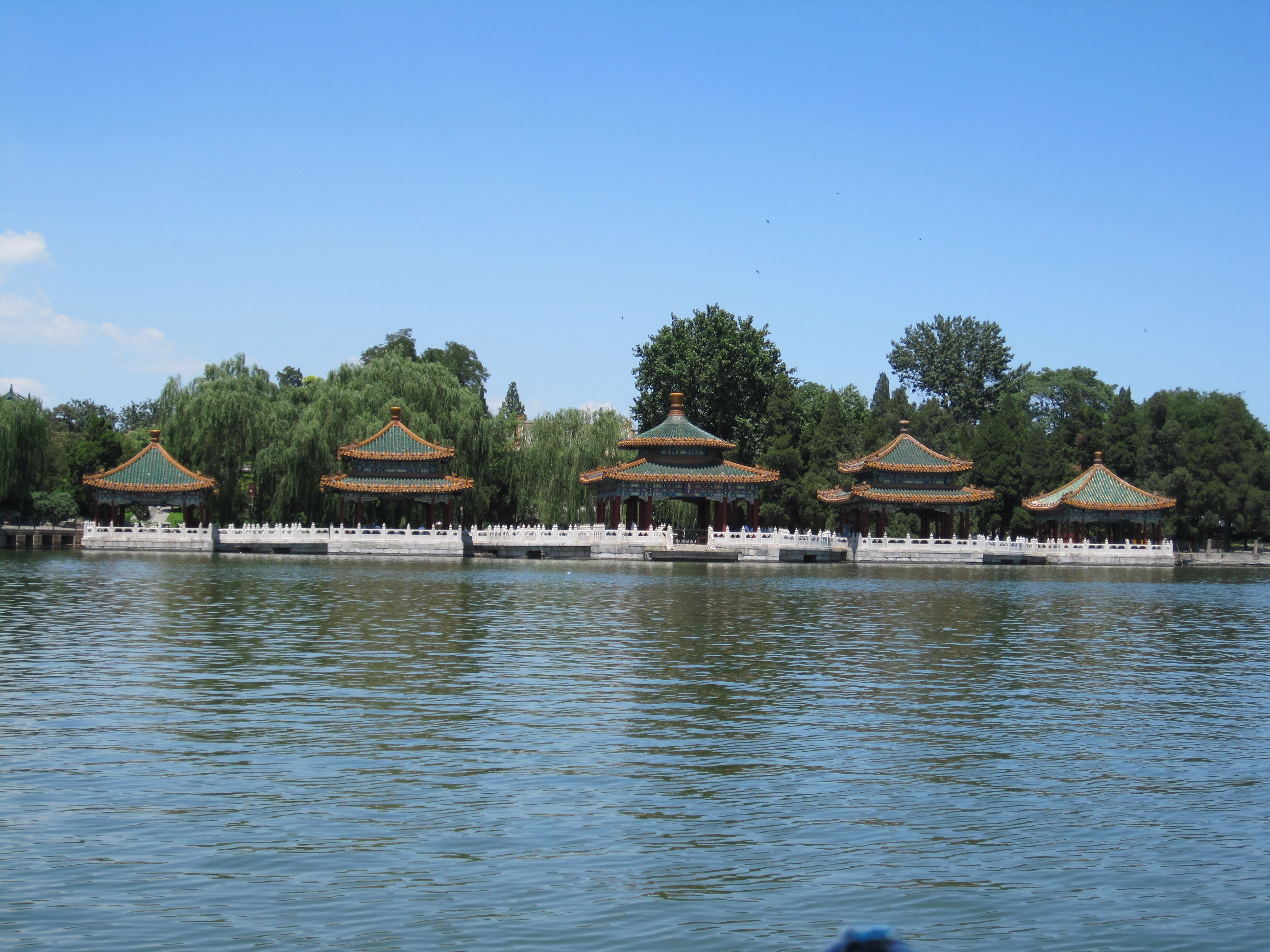
The Five-Dragon Pavilions

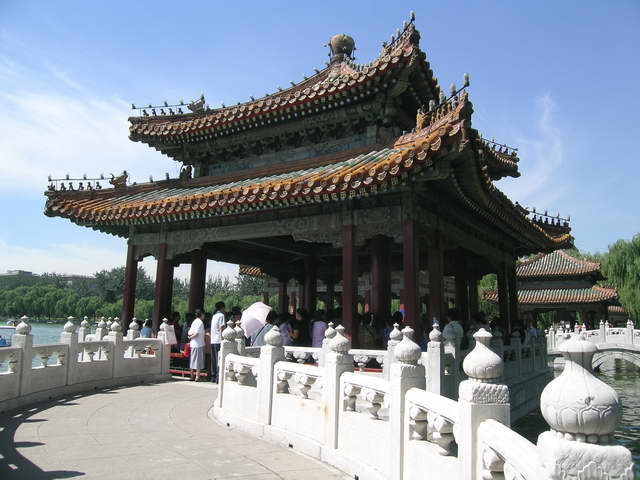
One of the dragon pavilions

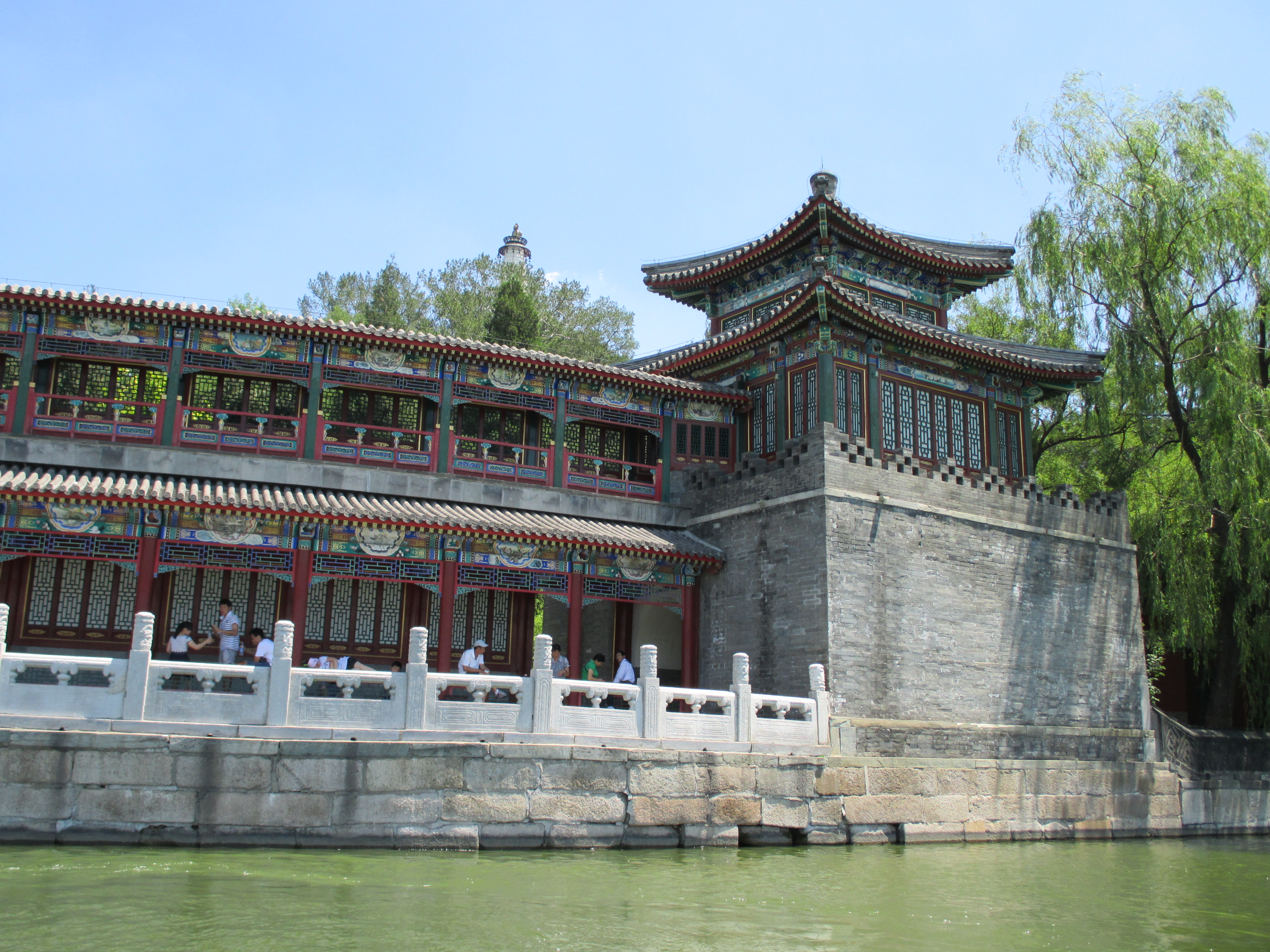
Pavilion of Sharing Coolness

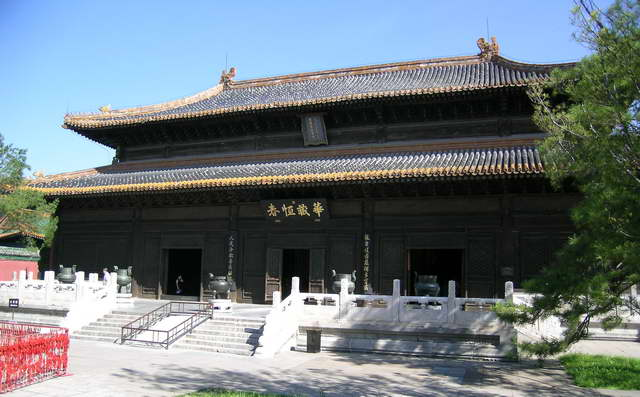
The Daci Zhenru Hall

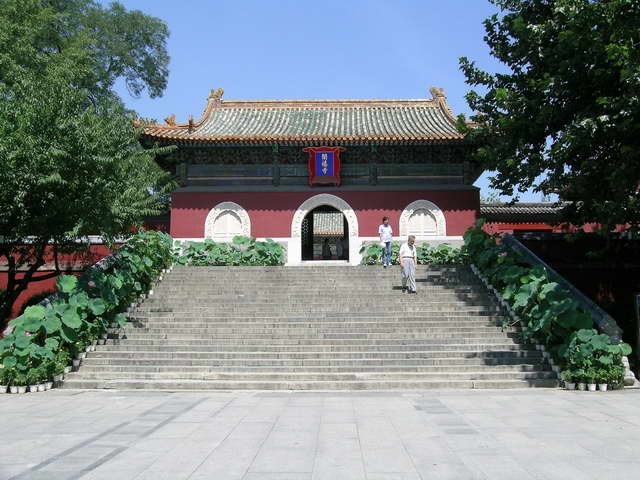
The entrance to the Chanfu Temple

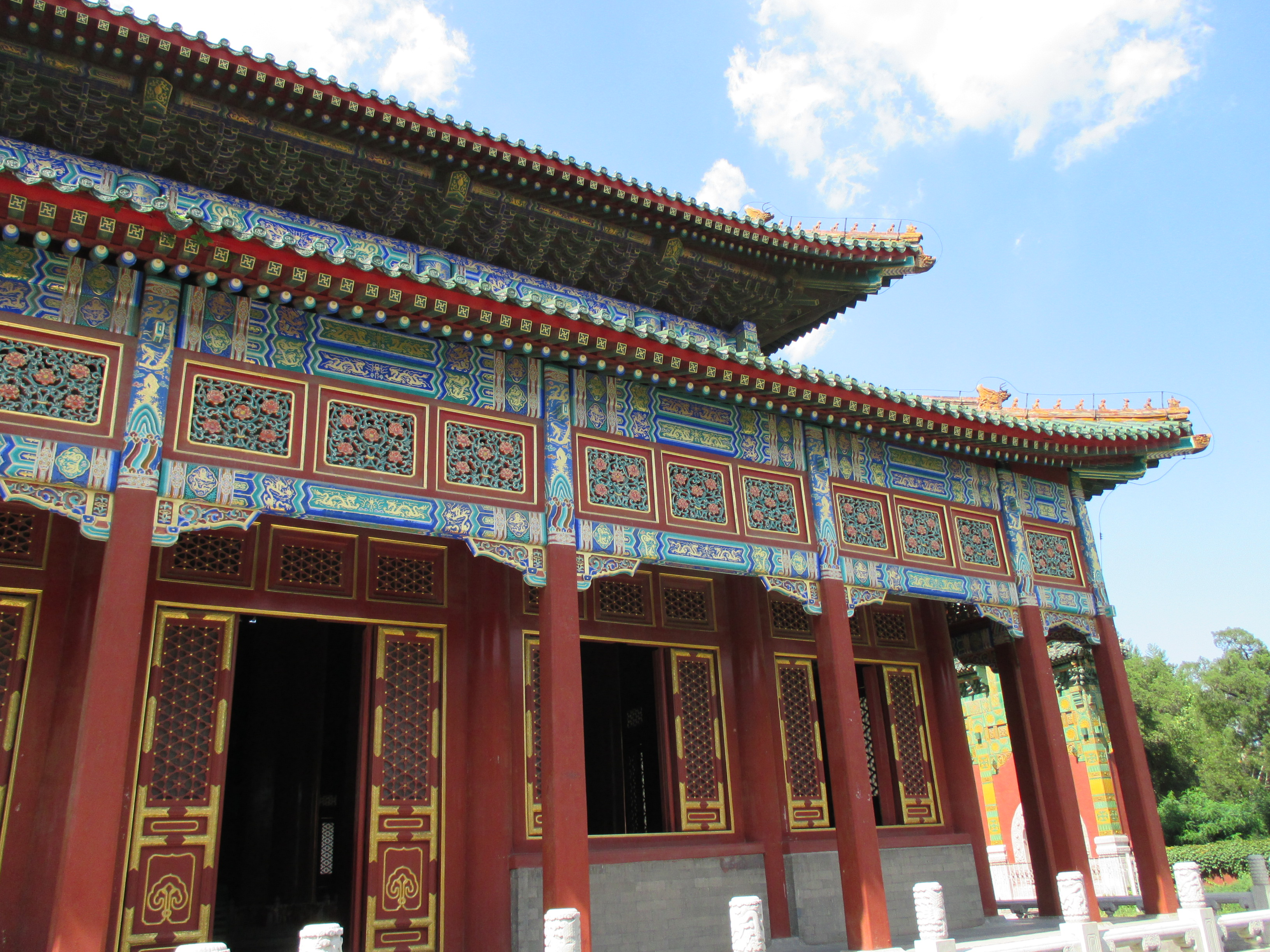
Xiaoxitian

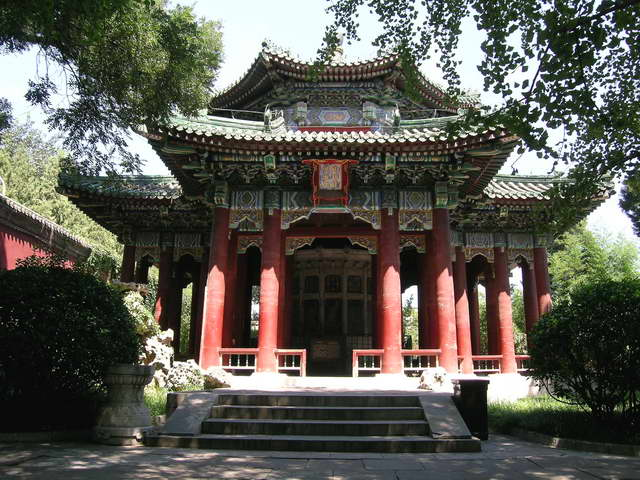
The Miaoxiang Pavilion

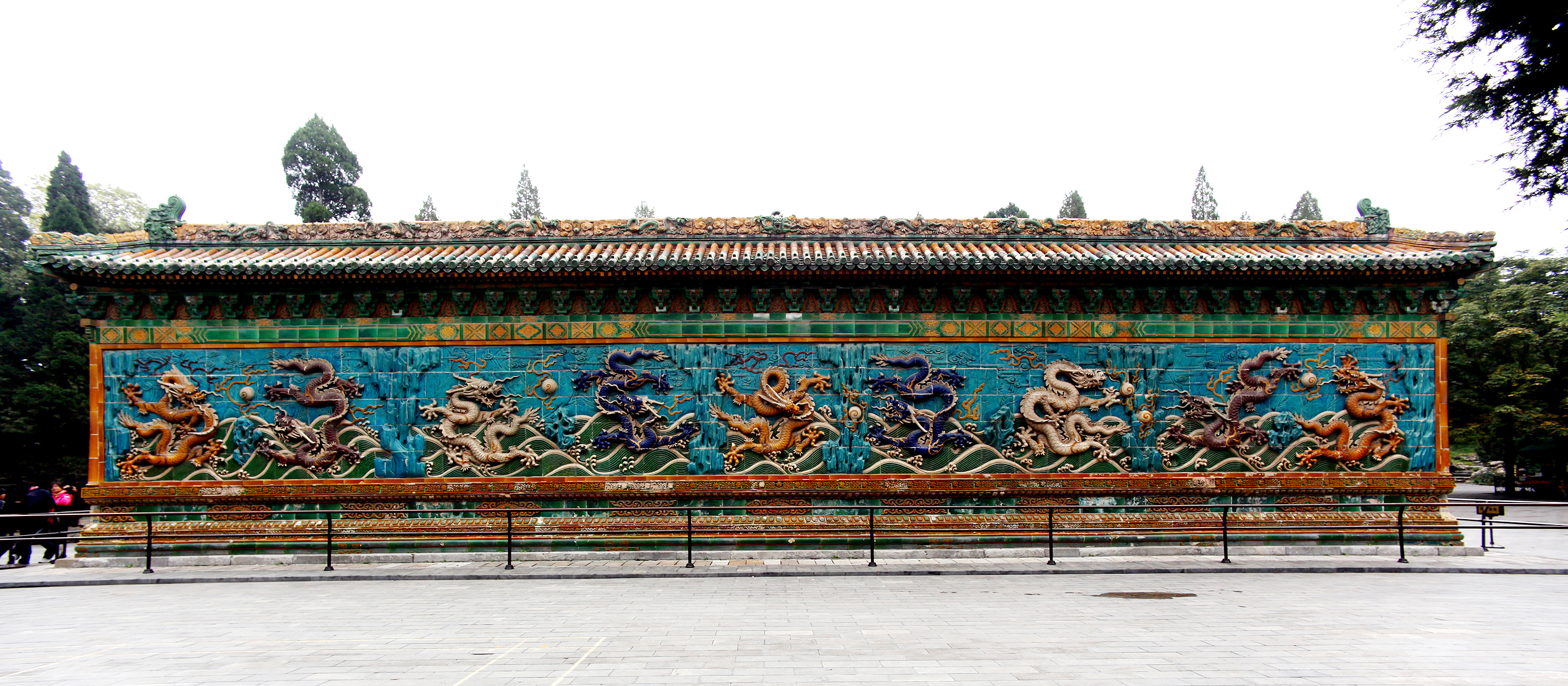
The Nine-Dragon Wall

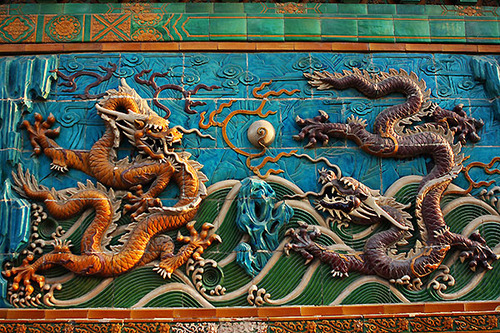
The Nine-Dragon Wall (detail)

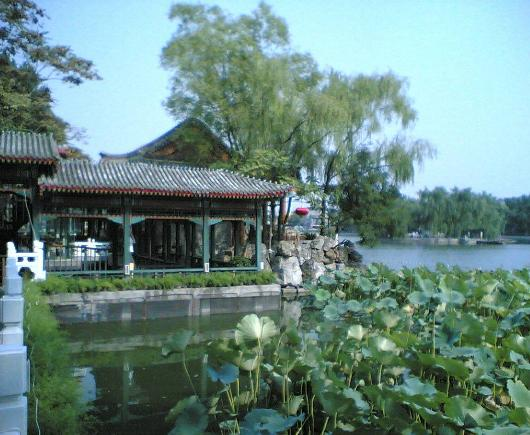
Chinese gardens are found throughout the park

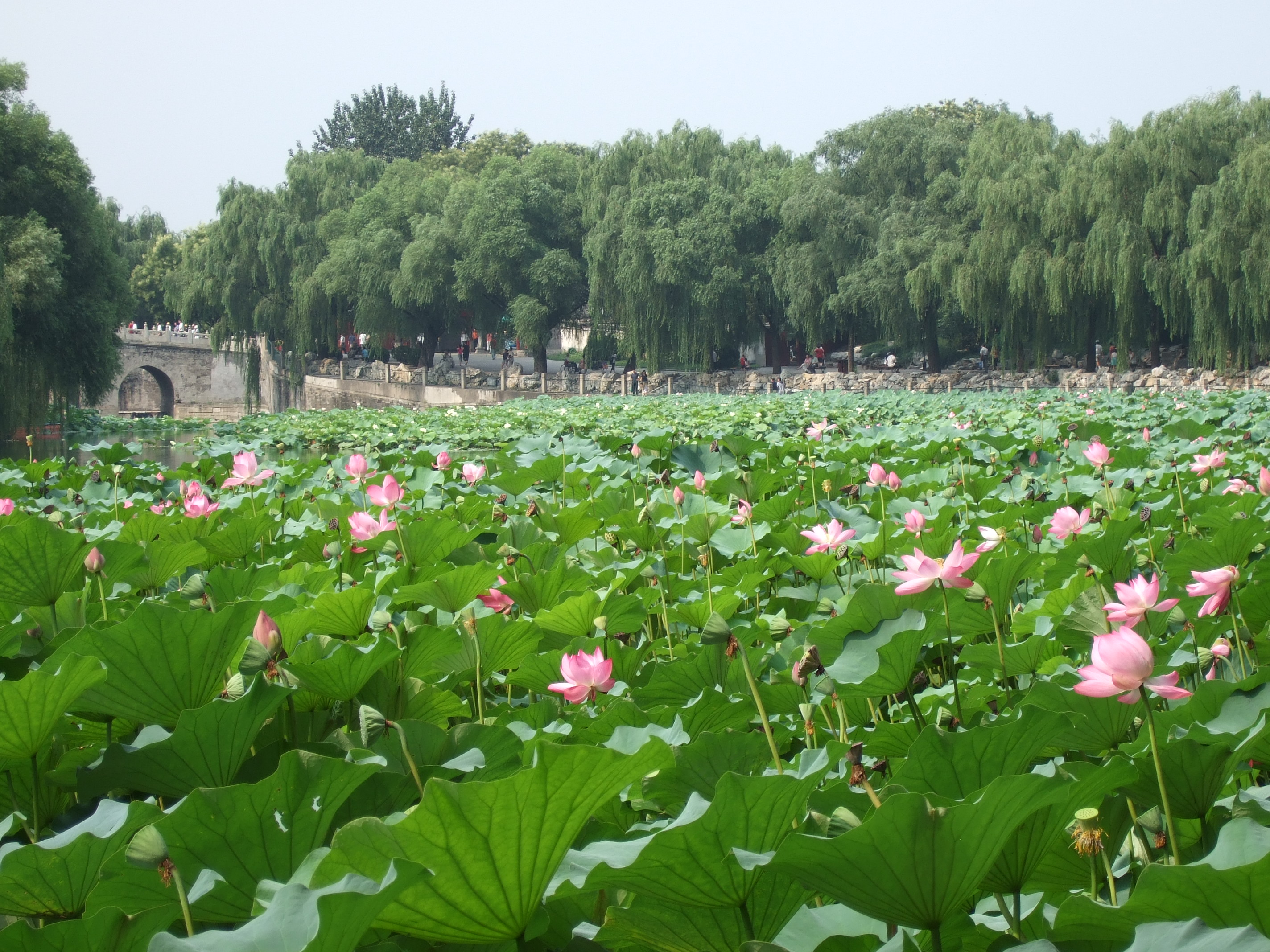
Lotuses in the park

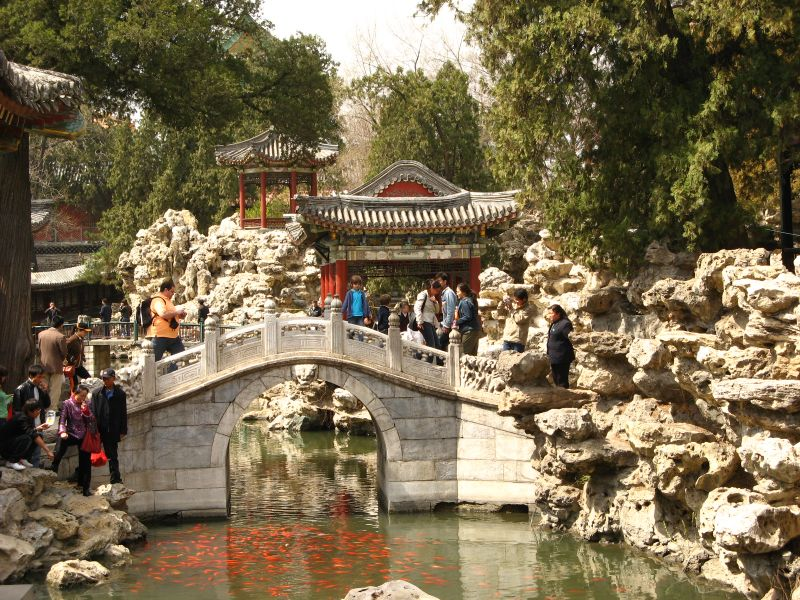
Bridge and Rockery at the Studio of Mental Serenity

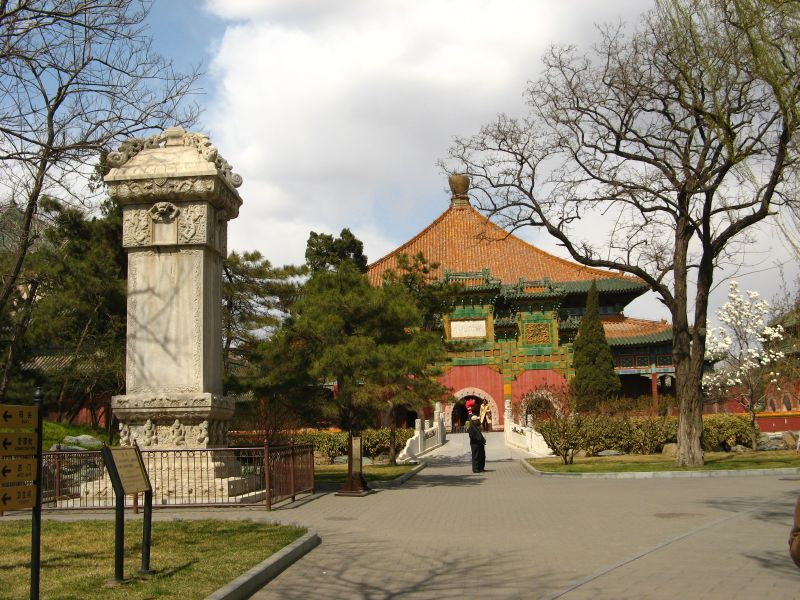
Western Paradise in the park

== See also ==
- Imperial City, Beijing
- Zhongnanhai
- Summer Palace
- Old Summer Palace
- Miaoying Temple, the site of another famous White Dagoba in Beijing
- Ming tombs
- Star Art Exhibition of 1979 took place here
