= Slender West Lake =

- 瘦西湖 (Chinese)
- The iconic Five-Pavilion Bridge in Slender West Lake

- Location within Jiangsu
- Location: Hanjiang District, Yangzhou, Jiangsu
- Coordinates: 32°24′36″N 119°25′03″E
- Type: Lake
- Website: ly.shouxihu.net

Slender West Lake
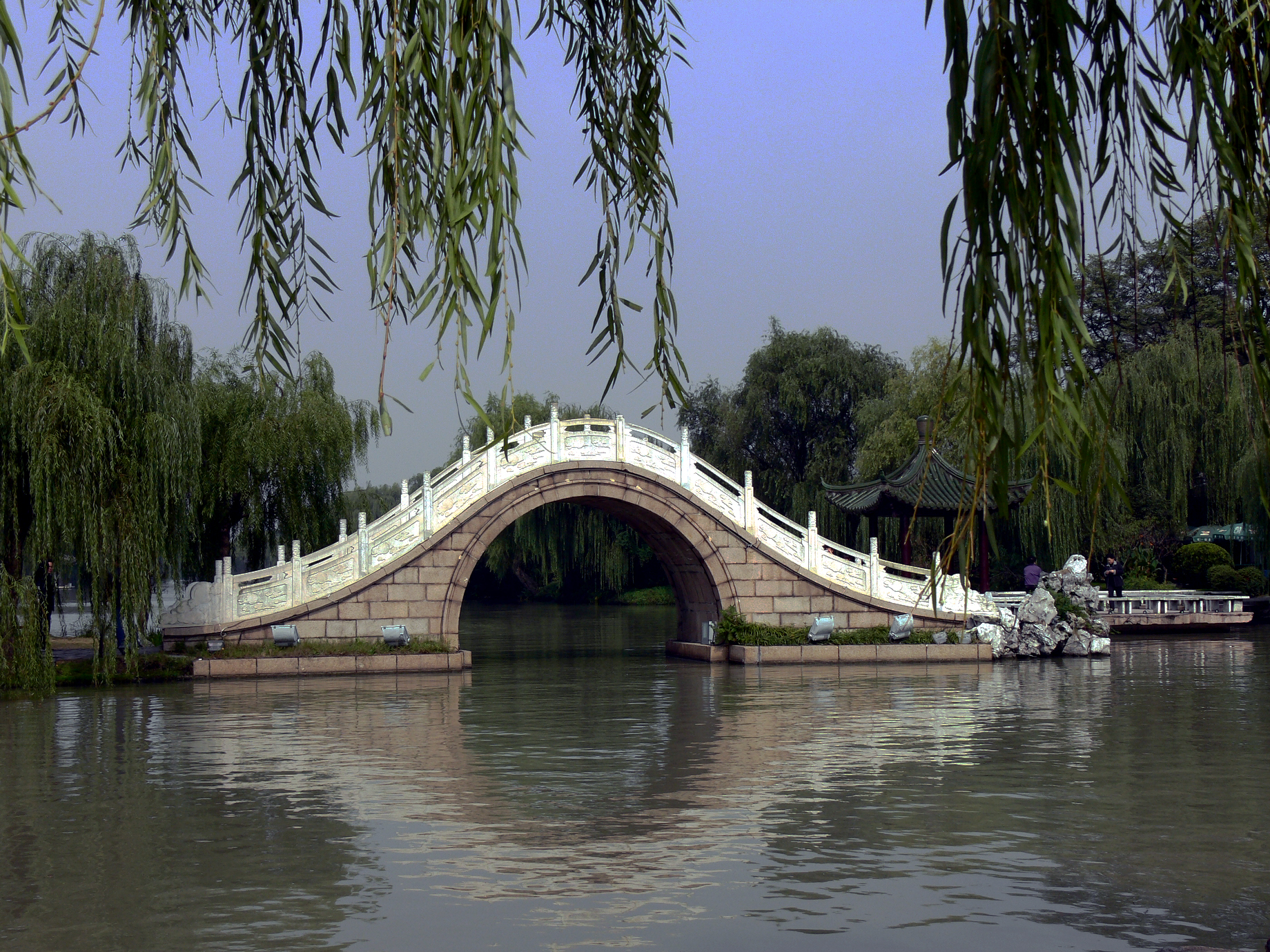
- The Twenty-Four Bridge in 2007
- Chinese: 瘦西湖
- Literal meaning: Skinny West Lake
Transcriptions
Standard Mandarin
- Hanyu Pinyin: Shòuxīhú
- Wade–Giles: Shou-hsi-hu

Slender West Lake Scenic Area
- Traditional Chinese: 揚州瘦西湖風景區
- Simplified Chinese: 扬州瘦西湖风景区
Transcriptions
Standard Mandarin
- Hanyu Pinyin: Yángzhōu Shòuxīhú Fēngjǐngqū
- Wade–Giles: Yang-chou Shou-hsi-hu Feng-ching-ch'ü

Historical names

Paoshan Creek
- Chinese: 炮山河
- Literal meaning: Artillery Hill Creek
Transcriptions
Standard Mandarin
- Hanyu Pinyin: Pàoshān Hé
- Wade–Giles: P'ao-shan Ho

Changchun Creek
- Traditional Chinese: 長春河
- Simplified Chinese: 长春河
- Literal meaning: Eternal Spring Creek
Transcriptions
Standard Mandarin
- Hanyu Pinyin: Chángchūn Hé
- Wade–Giles: Ch'ang-ch'un Ho

Baoyang Creek
- Traditional Chinese: 保揚河
- Simplified Chinese: 保扬河
- Literal meaning: Yangzhou-Protecting Creek
Transcriptions
Standard Mandarin
- Hanyu Pinyin: Bǎoyáng Hé
- Wade–Giles: Pao-yang Ho

Baozhang Creek
- Chinese: 保障河
- Literal meaning: Protecting Creek
Transcriptions
Standard Mandarin
- Hanyu Pinyin: Bǎozhàng Hé
- Wade–Giles: Pao-chang Ho

Baozhang Lake
- Chinese: 保障湖
- Literal meaning: Protecting Lake
Transcriptions
Standard Mandarin
- Hanyu Pinyin: Bǎozhàng Hú
- Wade–Giles: Pao-chang Hu

Slender West Lake, also known by its Chinese name Shouxihu and by other names, is a scenic lake in Hanjiang District in central Yangzhou, China. The lake developed from the city moats of Tang-era Yangzhou. During the Qing dynasty, its banks were the site of numerous estates for the area's wealthy officials and salt merchants. The lake and some of its attractions have been restored as a national park and AAAAA tourist attraction, requiring a ticket for admission and open only from 7 am to 6 pm.

== Names ==
In medieval and early modern China, the present Slender West Lake was described as a stretch of river variously known as Paoshan, Changchun, Baoyang, or Baozhang Creek. The area was popularly known as the Slender West Lake by the late 17th century, when the name was recorded in the treatise Yángzhōu Gǔchuī Cíxù (t 《揚州鼓吹詞序》, s 《扬州鼓吹词序》) compiled by Wu Qi (t 吳綺, s 吴绮, Wú Qǐ; 1619–1694). (Note: 城北一水通平山堂，名瘦西湖，本名保障湖。) It was further popularized in the 1736 poem "On Baozhang Creek" (《咏保障河》, Yǒng Bǎozhàng Hé) written by the Hangzhou native Wang Hang (汪沆, Wāng Hàng, 1704–1784) during a visit to Yangzhou. Wang had been the student of Li E, who had just completed his own work on the West Lake Records (《西湖志》, Xīhú Zhì) detailing the history of the area around Hangzhou's West Lake and Wang's short ode praised the town as similarly prosperous and attractive. (Note: 垂杨不断接残芜，雁齿虹桥俨花图。 也是销金一锅子，故应唤作瘦西湖。)

== Geography ==
Slender West Lake is located between Hanjiang and Guangling districts in the center of modern Yangzhou in central Jiangsu in eastern China. Originally part of the moats, canals, and streams around the older locations of Yangzhou, it lies above the northwestern corner of the city's Song, Ming, and Qing fortifications. The lake proper runs from Baozhang Lake at the north to the remains of the Qing moat at the south. The Slender West Lake Scenic Area includes Baozhang Lake and some islands and additional waterways to the west.

The present lake runs for 3.4 km (2.1 mi) and covers about 30 ha (0.12 sq mi). The scenic area around it covers at least 120 ha (0.46 sq mi).

The lake lies on the opposite side of the old city from the course of the Grand Canal to its east. It is nevertheless interconnected with it by streams along its entire length: by Baozhang Lake and the modern extent of the Han or Hangou Canal (t 邗溝, s 邗沟, Hángōu) on the north; by Cao or Caohe Creek (漕河, Cáo Hé) in the middle; and by Yudai Creek (t 玉帶河, s 玉带河, Yùdài Hé) or by Erdao Creek (二道河, Èrdào Hé), Lotus Pond Park, and Andun Creek (安墩河, Āndūn Hé) on the south.

== History ==
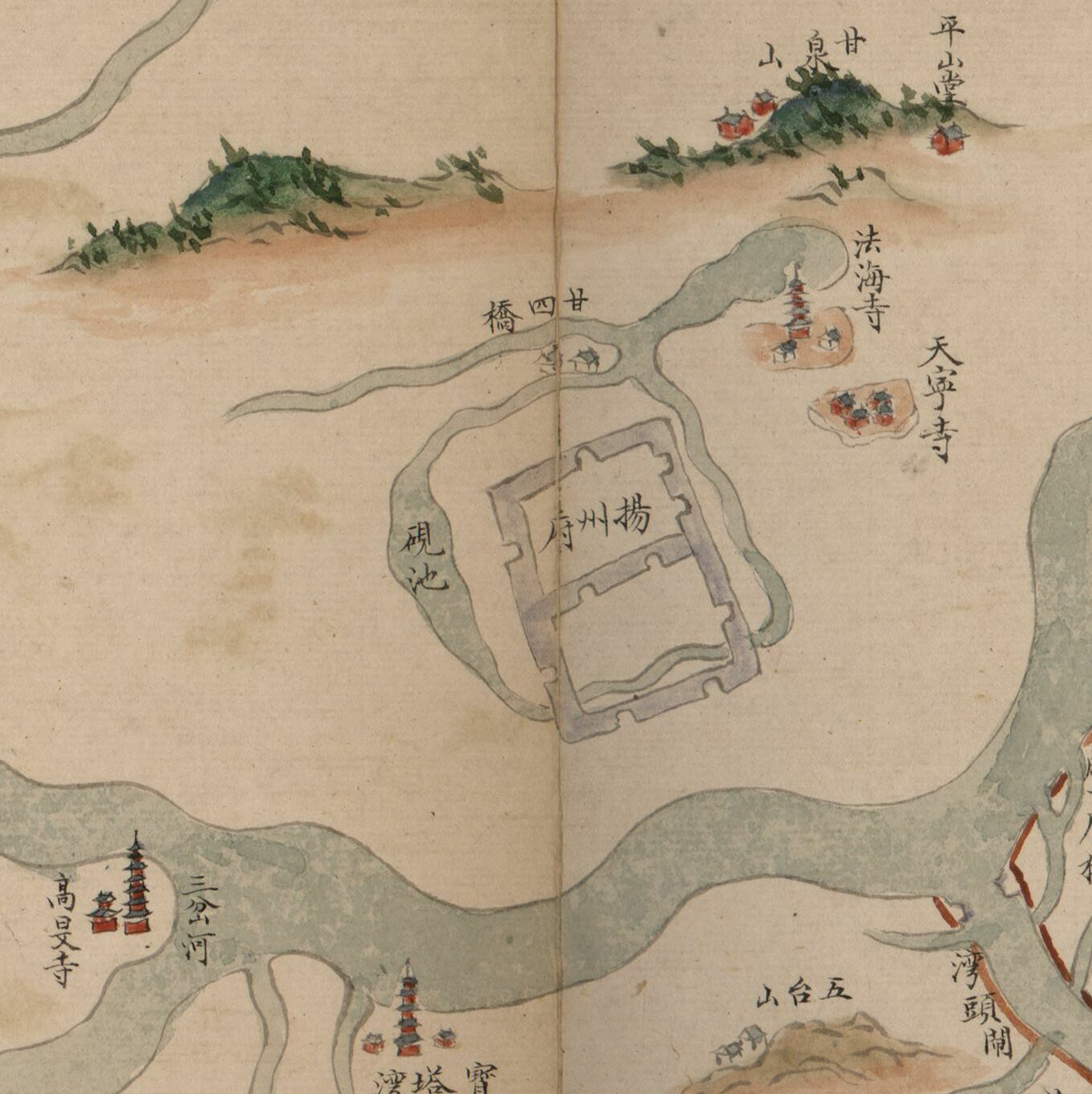
Yangzhou under the Qing, Slender West Lake marked by its Bridge of 24s

Despite Yangzhou's centuries of prosperity as a major hub on the Grand Canal, the area around Slender West Lake was not particularly built up until the Qianlong Era of the Qing, the mid-1700s. The area had been greatly damaged with the rest of city by the Qing conquest and the Yangzhou Massacre in May 1645. Under the Qing, however, the great wealth of the area's canal officials and salt merchants was used to construct lavish private residences and gardens along with nationally renowned restaurants and teahouses and decoration intended to welcome Qing emperors and officials, particularly the Qianlong Emperor. The lake was dredged and enlarged to handle the imperial entourage, particularly during his second visit in 1757. Several major landmarks self-consciously emulate features of other locations. The area was heavily damaged during the Taiping Rebellion in the 1850s and 1860s, but was a particular focus of rebuilding afterwards.

The lake was thoroughly dredged in 1979, allowing boats to again reach the Daming Temple in time for a long-planned bit of cultural diplomacy whereby the Tōshōdai-ji in Nara, Japan, allowed its 8th century sculpture of the monk and missionary Jianzhen to be temporarily exhibited at his original temple in mainland China. The lake was designated a national park in 1988.

A long bank planted with weeping willows follows the lake. At its midpoint stands a square terrace with pavilions at each of the corners and one in the center. Around the lake is a park in which are found several attractions: Xu Garden, the White Dagoba of Lianxing Temple, copied from the similar tower in Beijing's Beihai Park; Five-Pavilion Bridge; Small Gold Mountain (小金山, Xiǎojīnshān); and the Fishing Platform (釣魚台, Diàoyú Tái), a favorite retreat of the Qianlong Emperor. The emperor was so gratified by his luck in fishing at this spot that he ordered additional stipends for the town. As it turns out, his success had been augmented by local swimmers who lurked in the lake busily attaching fish to his hook. The present Bridge of 24s (t 二十四橋, s 二十四桥, Èrshísì Qiáo, or t 廿四橋, s 廿四桥, Niànsì Qiáo) is not located in its original place and probably derives from confusion with the 24 bridges recorded in Yangzhou under the Tang, the confusion arising from the general lack of distinction between singular and plural forms in Chinese.

== Legacy ==
Wang Hang's poem remains a point of pride for the city and the area remains a major tourist attraction. However, Zhu Ziqing found the comparison with Hangzhou ill taken; by comparison, he found the slenderness of the lake offputting despite enjoying Yangzhou's many canals.

== See also ==
- List of Chinese gardens
- Geyuan, a nearby traditional estate
