= Xihu =

Xihu may refer to:

== Mainland China ==
- West Lake (西湖), Hangzhou, Zhejiang
- Xihu District, Benxi (溪湖区), Liaoning
- Xihu District, Hangzhou (西湖区), Zhejiang
- Xihu District, Nanchang (西湖区), Jiangxi
- Xihu Township, Jiangxi (zh; 西湖乡), subdivision of Fuliang County, Jiangxi

Subdistricts (西湖街道)

- Xihu Subdistrict, Lanzhou (zh), subdivision of Qilihe District, Lanzhou, Gansu
- Xihu Subdistrict, Chaozhou (zh), subdivision of Xiangqiao District, Chaozhou, Guangdong
- Xihu Subdistrict, Leizhou (zh), subdivision of Leizhou, Guangdong
- Xihu Subdistrict, Changsha (zh), subdivision of Yuelu District, Changsha, Hunan
- Xihu Subdistrict, Nanchang (zh), subdivision of Xihu District, Nanchang, Jiangxi
- Xihu Subdistrict, Hangzhou (zh), subdivision of Xihu District, Hangzhou, Zhejiang

Towns (西湖镇)

- Xihu, Fuyang (zh), in Yingzhou District, Fuyang, Anhui
- Xihu, Tongling (zh), in Shizishan District, Tongling, Anhui
- Xihu, Chongqing (zh), in Jiangjin District, Chongqing
- Xihu, Guazhou County (zh), in Guazhou County, Gansu
- Xihu, Hanshou County (zh), in Hanshou County, Hunan
- Xihu, Jiangsu (zh), in Hanjiang District, Yangzhou, Jiangsu
- Xihu, Rizhao (zh), in Donggang District, Rizhao, Shandong
- Xihu, Yanggu County (zh), in Yanggu County, Shandong
- Xihu, Xinjiang (zh), in Wusu, Xinjiang

== Taiwan ==
- Xihu, Changhua (溪湖鎮), township in Changhua County
- Xihu, Miaoli (西湖鄉), township in Miaoli County
- Xihu metro station (西湖站), a station of the Taipei Metro

== See also ==
- Xihu Park station (西湖公园站), a station of the Changsha Metro
