= Shuangqiao =

Shuangqiao (Chinese: 双桥; lit. 'double bridge') may refer to the following locations in China:

== Towns ==
- Shuangqiao, Guangxi, a town in Wuming County, Nanning, Guangxi
- Shuangqiao, Tangshan, in Kaiping District, Tangshan, Hebei
- Shuangqiao, Qidong, in Qidong County
- Shuangqiao, Jiangxi, in Wanzai County, Jiangxi
- Shuangqiao, Shandong, a village in Yuncheng County, Shadong
- Shuangqiao, Zhoushan, a town in Qujiang District, Zhejiang

== Townships ==
- Shuangqiao Township, Henan, a township in Yongcheng District, Henan
- Shuangqiao Subdistrict, Yangzhou, in Hanjiang District, Yangzhou
- Shuangqiao Township, Jiangxi, in Suichuan County, Jiangxi
- Shuangqiao Township, Zhejiang, in Qujiang District, Quzhou, Zhejiang

== Districts ==
- Shuangqiao District, Chengde, Hebei
- Shuangqiao District, Chongqing
- Shuangqiao Subdistrict, a subdistrict in Xuanzhou District, Xuancheng, Anhui
- Shuangqiao Subdistrict, Yangzhou, in Hanjiang District, Yangzhou, Jiangsu

== See also ==
- Shuangqiao station (disambiguation)
