= Xinsheng =

Xinsheng may refer to:

- Babies On Board, a 2018 Singaporean TV series

== Towns and townships in China ==
Chongqing

- Xinsheng, Liangping District (新盛), a town in Liangping District
- Xinsheng, Qijiang District (新盛), a town in Qijiang District
- Xinsheng, Tongnan District (新胜), a town in Tongnan District
- Xinsheng, Zhong County (新生), a town in Zhong County

Heilongjiang

- Xinsheng Township, Baiquan County (新生乡), a township in Baiquan County
- Xinsheng Oroqen Ethnic Township (新生鄂伦春族乡), a township in Heihe

Sichuan

- Xinsheng, Deyang (新盛), a town in Deyang
- Xinsheng, Santai County (新生), a town in Santai County
- Xinsheng Township, Dazhu County (新生乡), a township in Dazhu County
- Xinsheng Township, Pengxi County (新胜乡), a township in Pengxi County
- Xinsheng Township, Qianwei County (新盛乡), a township in Qianwei County

== Subdistricts in China ==
- Xinsheng Subdistrict, Panjin (新生街道), a subdistrict in Xinglongtai District, Panjin, Liaoning
- Xinsheng Subdistrict, Yangzhou (新盛街道), a subdistrict in Hanjiang District, Yangzhou, Jiangsu
- Xinsheng Subdistrict, Datong (新胜街道), a subdistrict in Yungang District, Datong, Shanxi
