= Touqiao =

Touqiao (simplified Chinese: 头桥; traditional Chinese: 頭橋; pinyin: tóuqiáo) may refer to these places in China:

- Touqiao, Jiangsu, a town in Yangzhou, Jiangsu
- Touqiao Subdistrict, Guiyang, Guizhou
