= Tongguan =

Tongguan may refer to:

- Tong Pass, an important mountain pass separating the North China plain from Wei River valley (Guanzhong), located in modern Tongguan County
- Tongguan County, a county in Shaanxi, China, named after the pass
- Tongguan District, a district in Tongling, Anhui, China
- Tongguan Subdistrict, a subdistrict in Wangcheng District, Changsha, Hunan, China
- Tongguan, Yunnan (通关), a town in Mojiang Hani Autonomous County, Yunnan, China

== See also ==
- Tong Guan (1054–1126), Song dynasty eunuch, politician and military leader
