= Jiangwang Subdistrict =

Jiangwang Subdistrict 蒋王街道
- Subdistrict
- Location in Jiangsu Jiangwang Subdistrict (China)
- Coordinates: 32°21′23″N 119°21′30″E
- Country: People's Republic of China
- Province: Jiangsu
- Prefecture-level city: Yangzhou
- District: Hanjiang District

Area
  - Total: 13.2 km^{2} (5.1 sq mi)

Population (2017)
  - Total: 33,000
  - Density: 2,500/km^{2} (6,500/sq mi)
- Time zone: UTC+6.30 (MST)

Jiangwang Subdistrict (simplified Chinese: 蒋王街道; traditional Chinese: 蔣王街道; pinyin: Jiǎngwáng Jiēdào) is a subdistrict located in the Hanjiang District of Yangzhou, Jiangsu, China. The subdistrict covers a total area of 13.2 square kilometers, has a population of 33,000 people, and is divided into five residential communities and four villages:

== Etymology ==
The subdistrict is named after Jiangwang Temple, a site in ancient Nanjing named for an ancient king named Jiang.

== Administrative divisions ==
=== Current status ===
As of 2020, the subdistrict is divided into five residential communities and four villages. The western 8.57 square kilometers of the subdistrict are rural, whereas the eastern 4.63 square kilometers of the subdistrict are urbanized.

=== Recent History ===
==== 2006 Restructuring ====
In 2006, a number of villages which formerly belonged to Jiangwang were given to the neighboring Xinsheng Subdistrict. In the same year a number of villages within Jiangwang were merged, specifically, the former village of Zhiyuan merged into Yulin Village, the former village of Linhe merged into Silian Village, and the former village of Tanghu merged into Yuelai Village. This resulted in the subdistrict being divided into two neighborhood committees [zh] and four villages. As of 2020, neighborhood committees include those of Jiangwang (蒋王; Jiǎngwáng), Heyue (和月; Héyuè), Jiangyi (蒋邑), Yulin (余林), and Heqiao (何桥). Villages include Yulin Village (余林村; Yúlín Cūn), Heqiao Village 何桥村; Héqiáo Cūn), Yuelai Village (悦来村; Yuèlái Cūn), and Silian Village 四联村; Sìlián Cūn).

== Economy ==
As of 2017, the subdistrict reported a GDP of 5.375 billion Renminbi.

=== Agriculture ===
Currently, the subdistrict is home to 6500 mu of vegetable crop fields. In recent years, Jiangwang has grown six new varieties of vegetables, eight types of nursery stock flowers and two tunnel technologies. Nearly ten thousand yuan has been used to construct agricultural facilities, dredge 103 rivers, complete 21.5 liters of earthwork and build another 3500 meters of brick or stone lining and drained a new pump station.

=== Industry ===
Companies which have operations in Jiangwang include Red Star Macalline [zh], Princess Disha, and Qinman.

== Education ==
The subdistrict is home to Jiangwang Middle School, a private middle school founded in 1960, which enrolls over 2,700 students.
