= Chahe Subdistrict =

Chahe Subdistrict 汊河街道
- Subdistrict
- Location in Jiangsu
- Coordinates: 32°20′32″N 119°22′49″E
- Country: People's Republic of China
- Province: Jiangsu
- Prefecture-level city: Yangzhou
- District: Hanjiang District
- Time zone: UTC+8 (China Standard)

Chahe Subdistrict (Chinese: 汊河街道; pinyin: Chāhé Jiēdào) is a subdistrict in Hanjiang District, Yangzhou, Jiangsu, China. The subdistrict spans an area of 21.4 square kilometres (8.3 mi^{2}).

== History ==
Chahe Subdistrict was upgraded to a subdistrict from a town in April 2003.

== Geography ==
Chahe Subdistrict has 1,062 hectares (4.10 mi^{2}) of arable land, accounting for about 50% of its total area.

== Administrative divisions ==
As of 2021, Chahe Subdistrict administers the following three residential communities and nine administrative villages:

- Xuzhuang Community (许庄社区)
- Xibalipu Community (西八里铺社区)
- Gaoqiao Community (高桥社区)
- Xuji Village (徐集村)
- Huzhuang Village (胡庄村)
- Xuelou Village (薛楼村)
- Dongqing Village (冻青村)
- Yunxi Village (运西村)
- Mingxing Village (明星村)
- Jiangzhuang Village (蒋庄村)
- Dongshi Village (东石村)
- Jianhua Village (建华村)

== Economy ==
Chahe Subdistrict is part of the Yangzhou Economic-Technological Development Area. As of 2006, Chahe Subdistrict's gross domestic product totaled 1.092 billion renminbi, up 19.67% from the previous year.

== Education ==
Yangzhou University's Guangling College (Chinese: 广陵学院; pinyin: Guǎnglíng Xuéyuàn) is located in Chahe Subdistrict.

== Transportation ==
National Highway 328 runs through the north of the subdistrict. The Ningtong Expressway, which connects Nanjing and Nantong, also runs through the subdistrict. Other major roads in the subdistrict include Yangzijiang Road (Chinese: 扬子江路; pinyin: Yángzǐ Jiāng Lù; lit. 'Yangtze River Road'), and Runyang South Road (Chinese: 润扬南路; pinyin: Rùn Yáng Nán Lù).

== See also ==
- List of township-level divisions of Jiangsu
- Runyang Yangtze River Bridge
- Yangzhou University
