= YZU =

YZU may refer to:

- Whitecourt Airport (IATA: YZU) in Alberta, Canada
- Yangzhou University in Yangzhou, China
- Yuan Ze University in Taoyuan City, Taiwan
