= High School Affiliated to Yangzhou University =

- 扬州大学附属中学
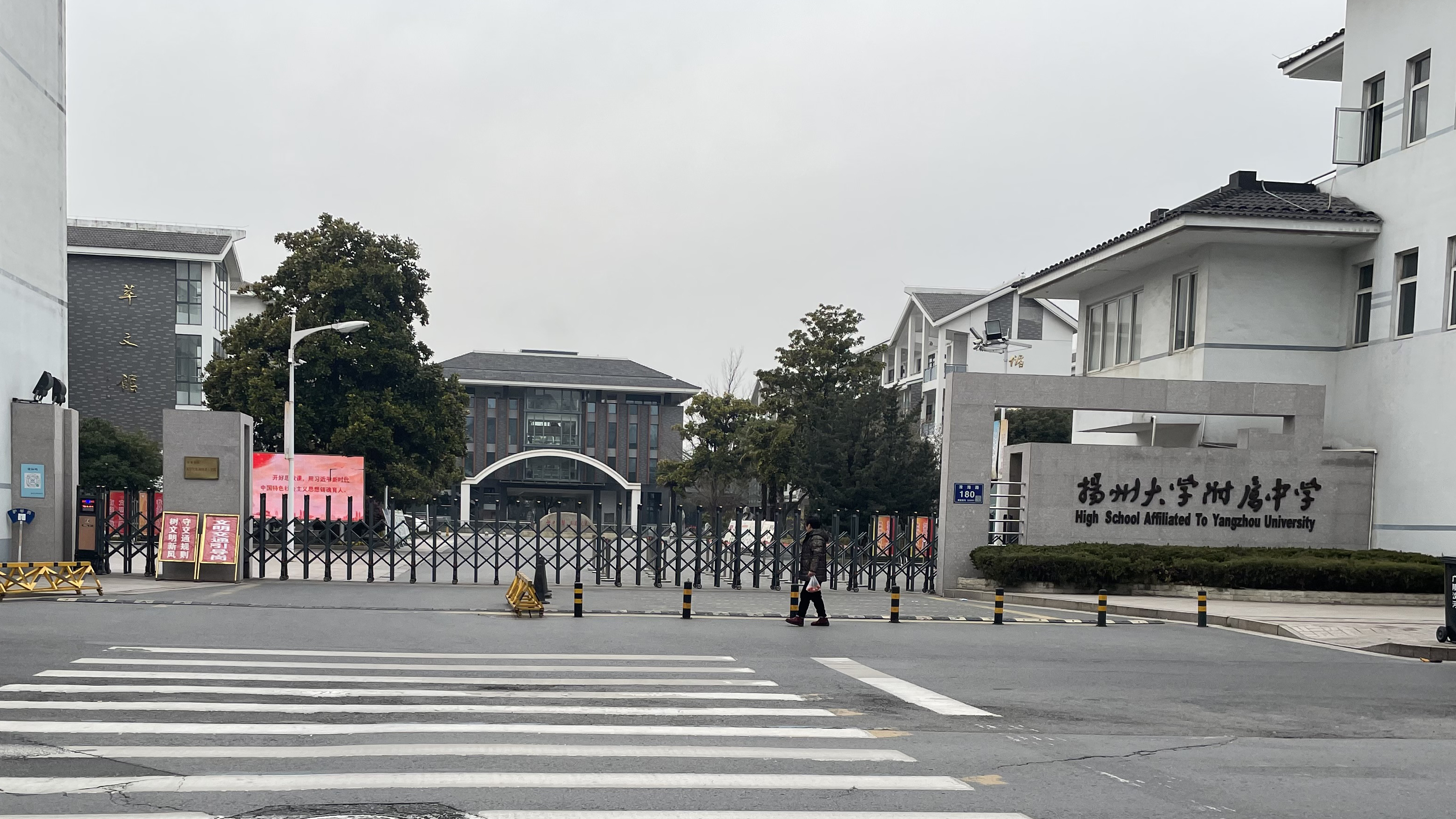

Location
- NO.180, Huaihai Road; Yangzhou, Jiangsu; China

Information
- School type: Public
- Motto: 求真、求善、求美、求健
- Established: 1951
- Headmaster: Lu Tingshun

High School Affiliated to Yangzhou University (Chinese: 扬州大学附属中学) is a high school affiliated to Yangzhou University in Jiangsu Province, China. It is located at Huaihai Road, Yangzhou (beside the Slender West Lake). The school was established in 1951.

== Buildings ==
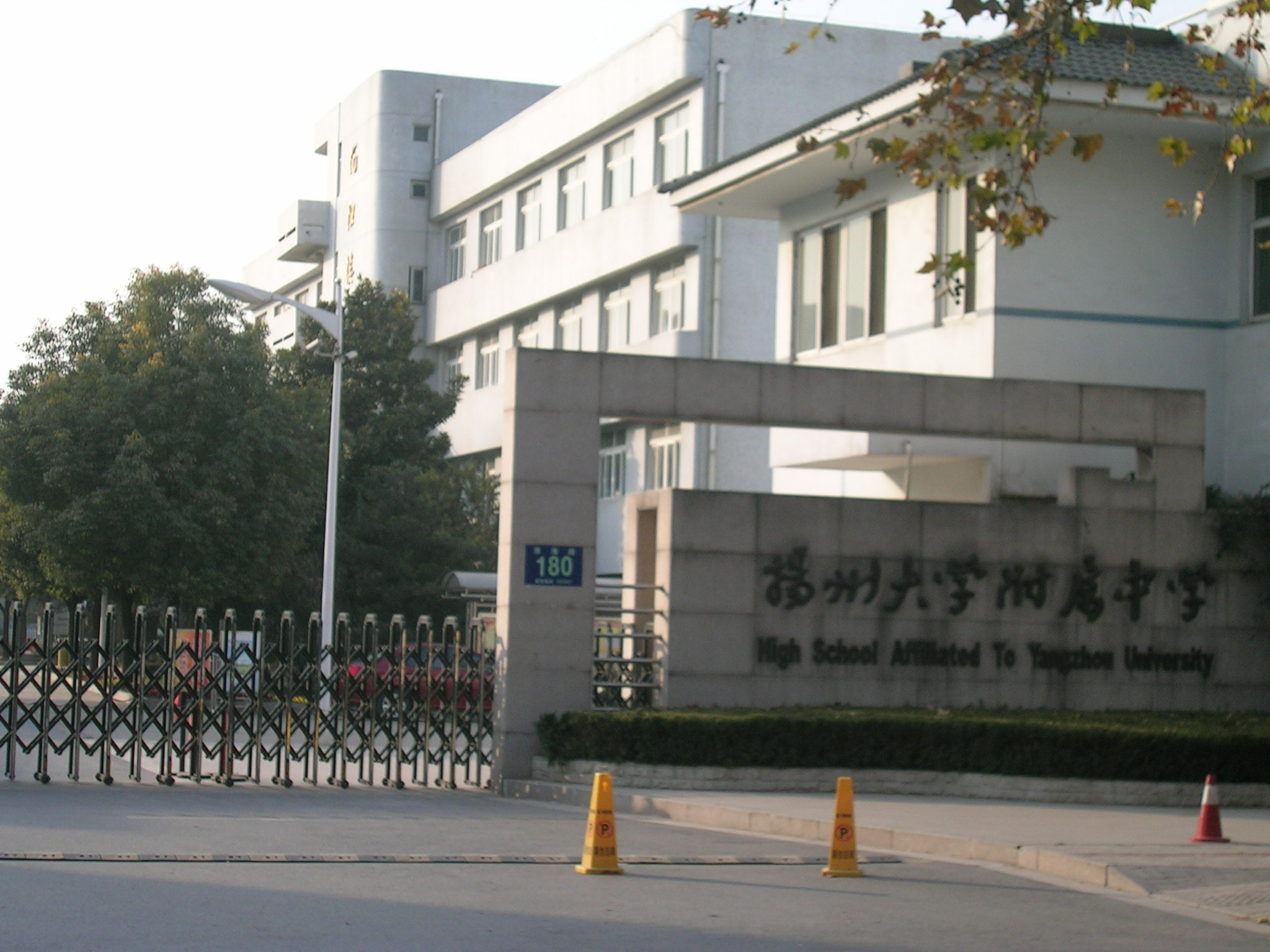
Gate

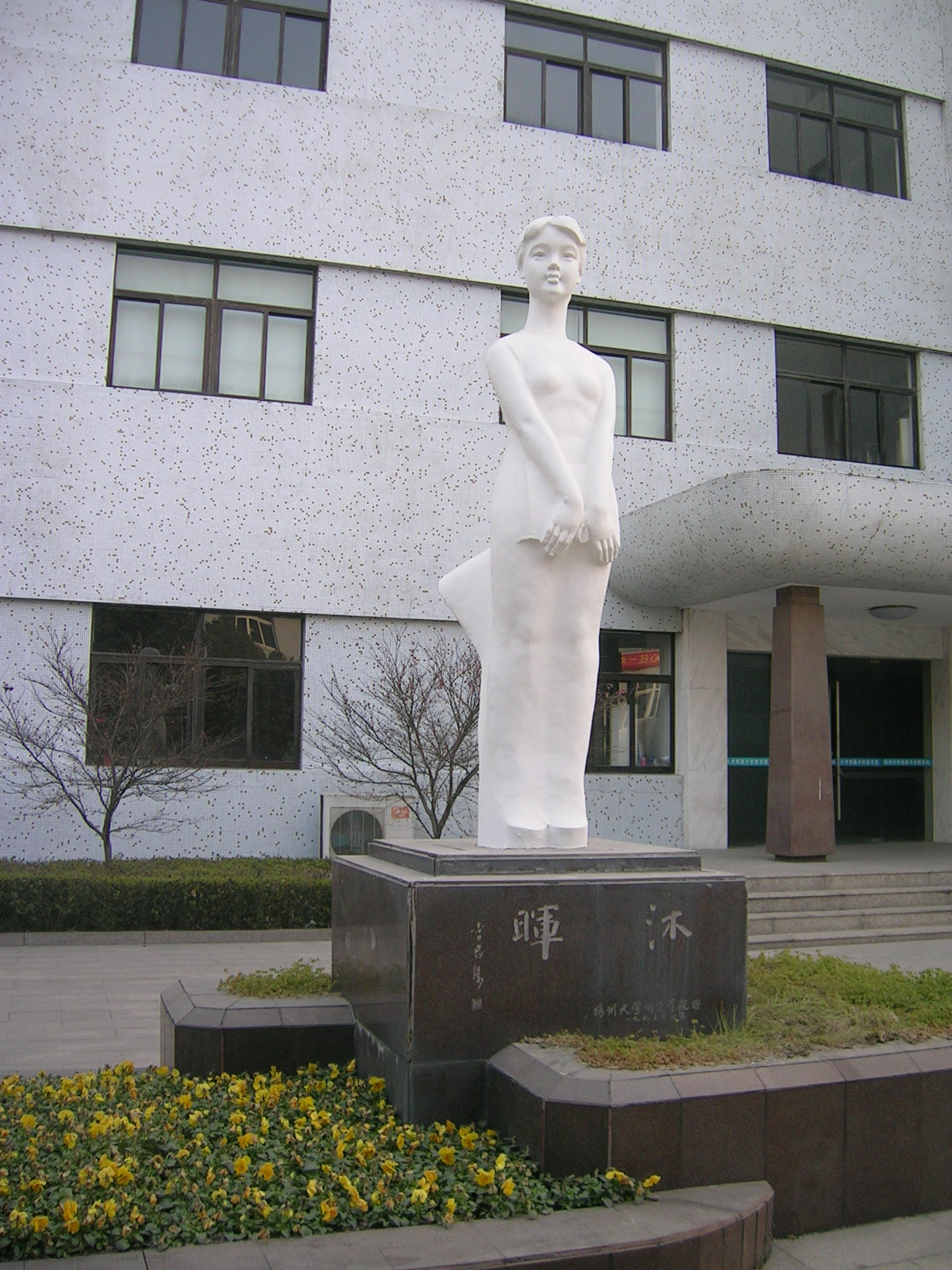
Statue in front of school library

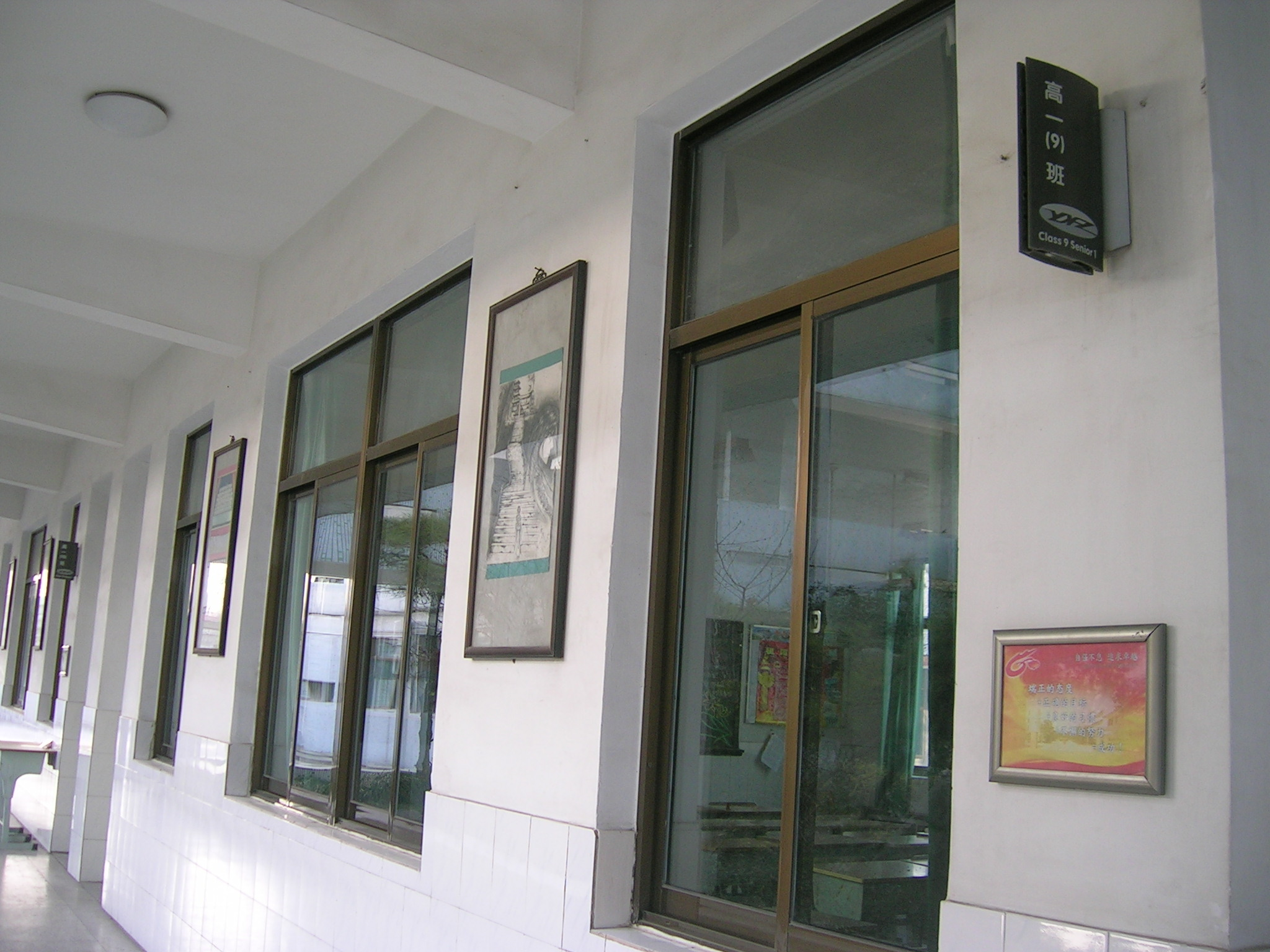
Classroom

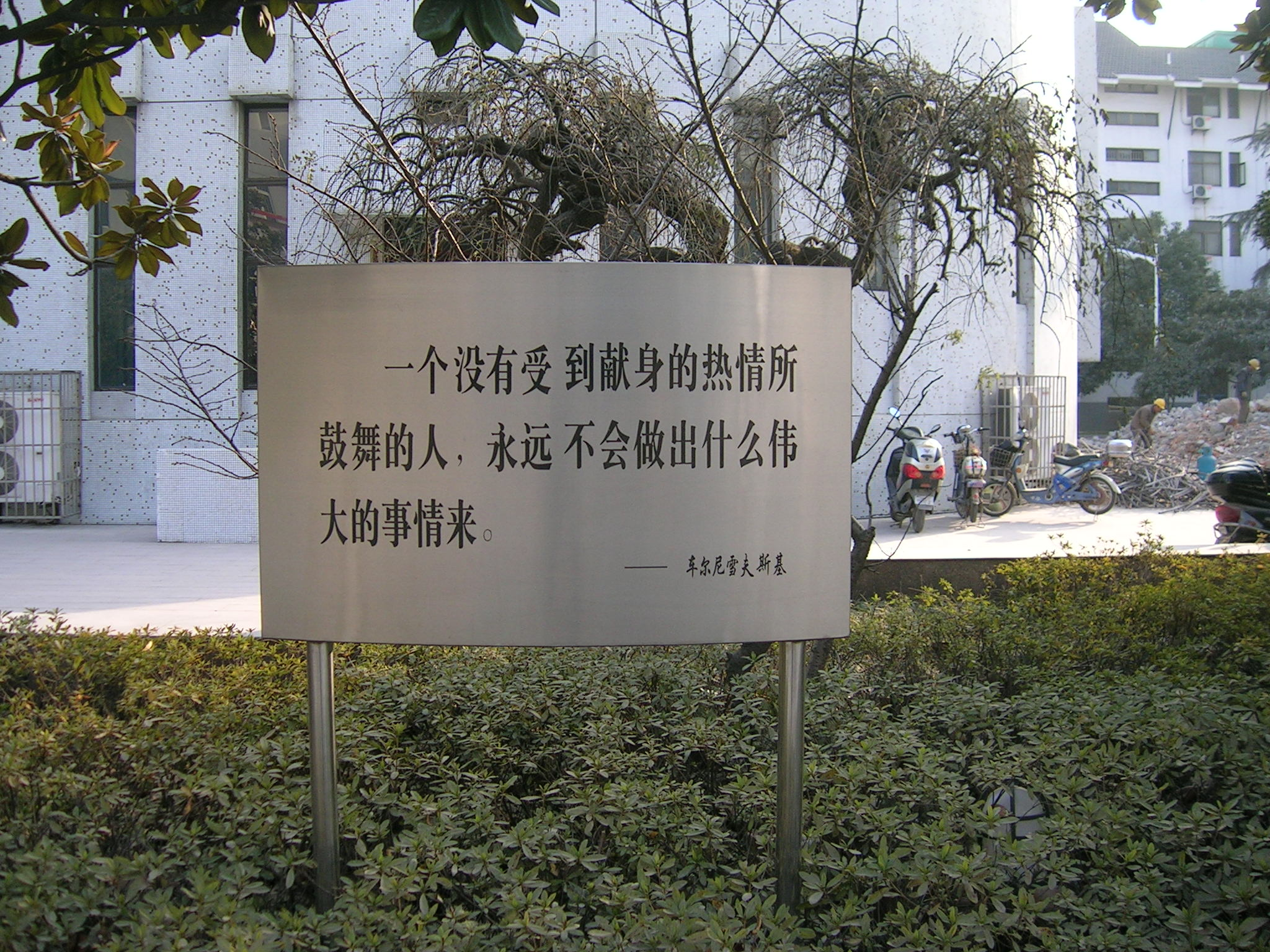
Board in school

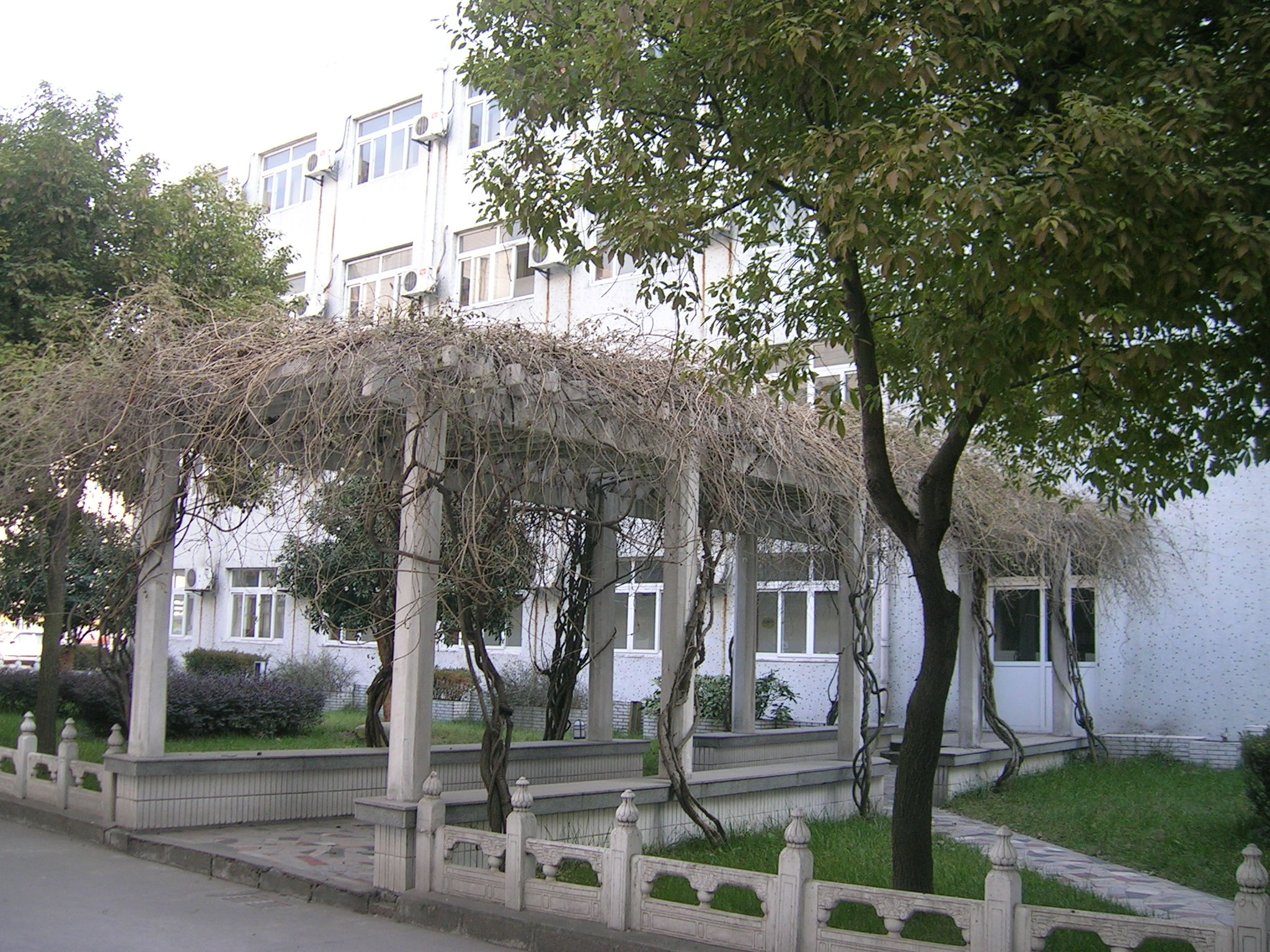
Little Garden

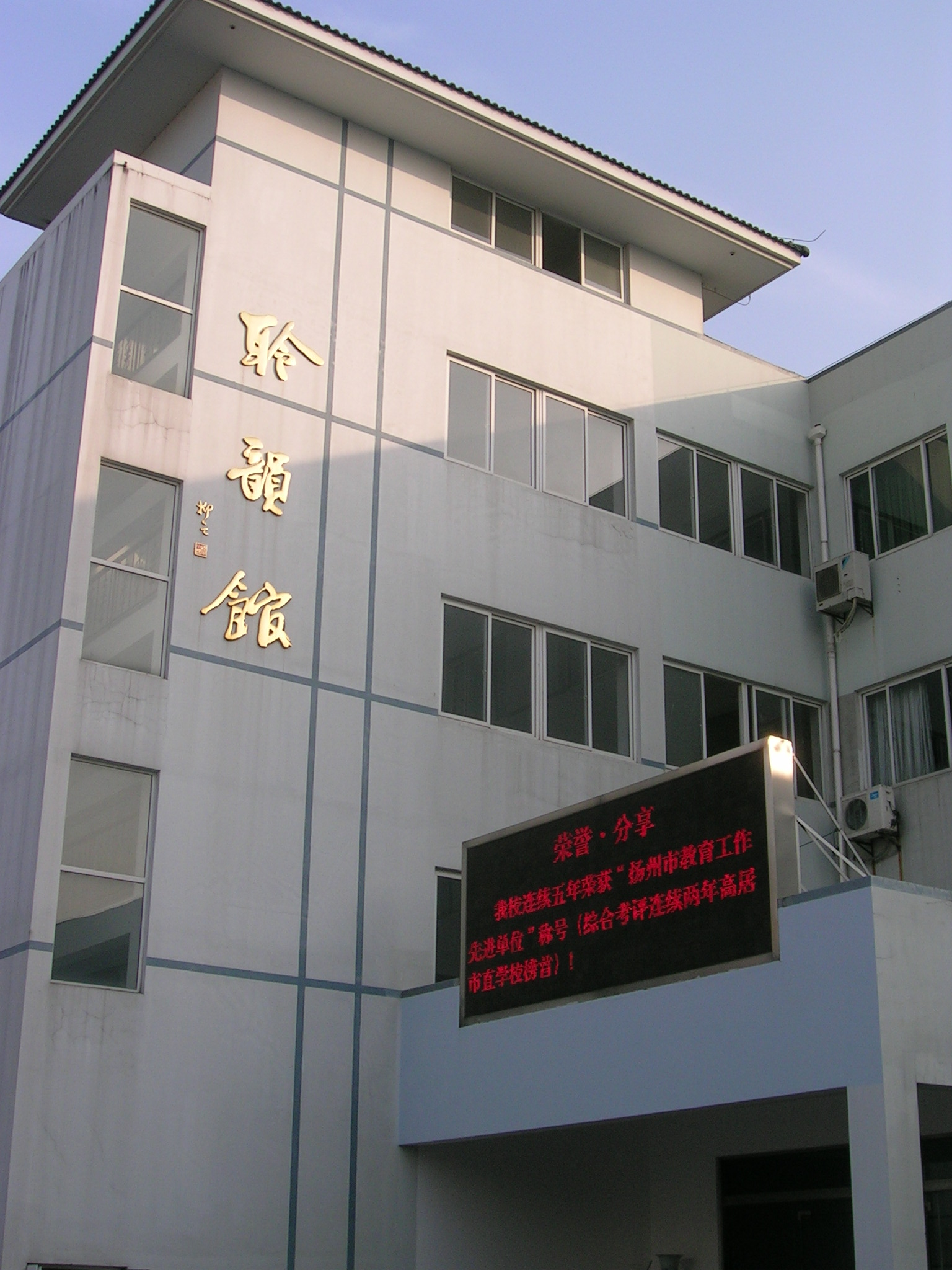
Linyun Building

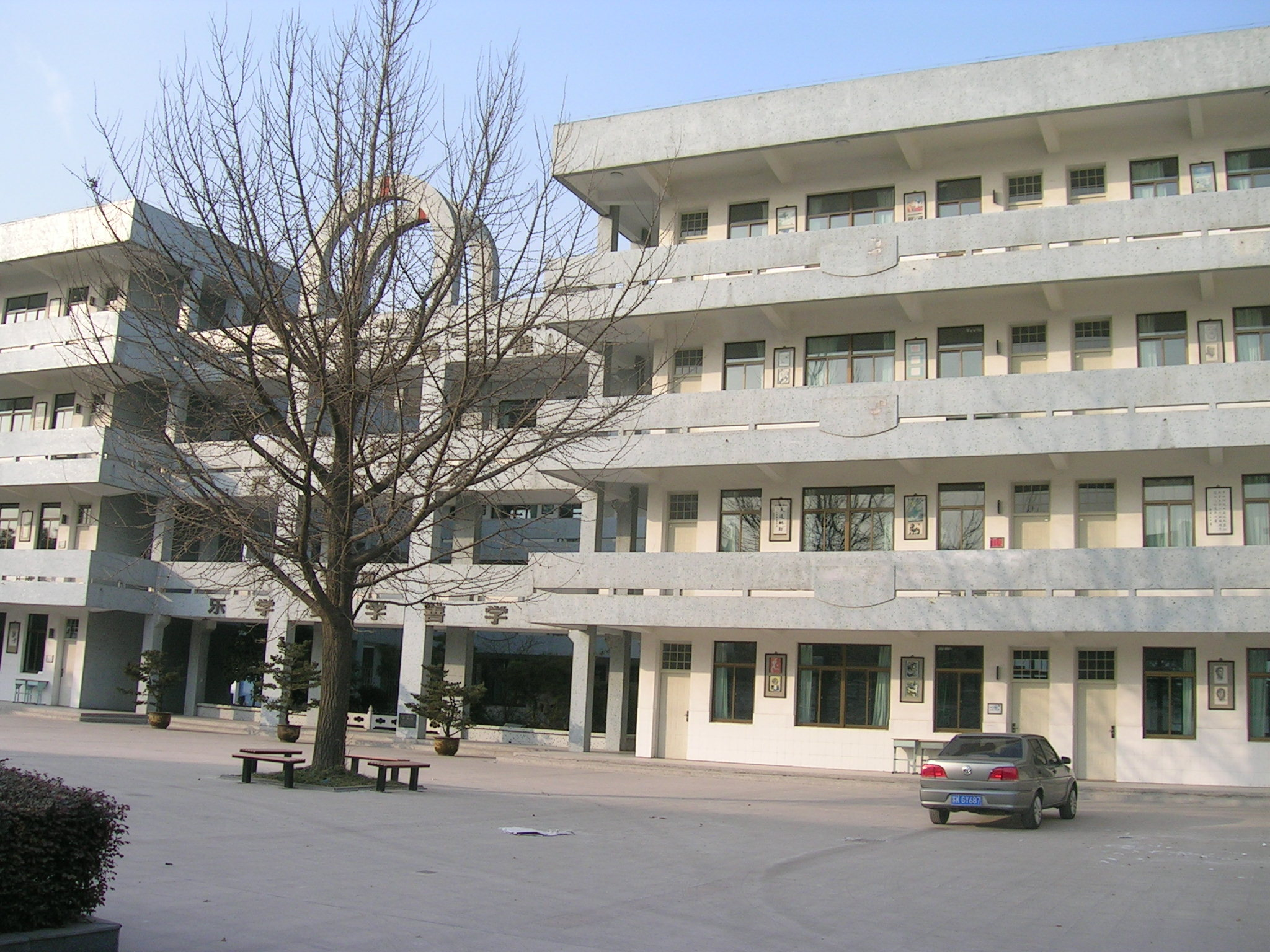
Teaching Building

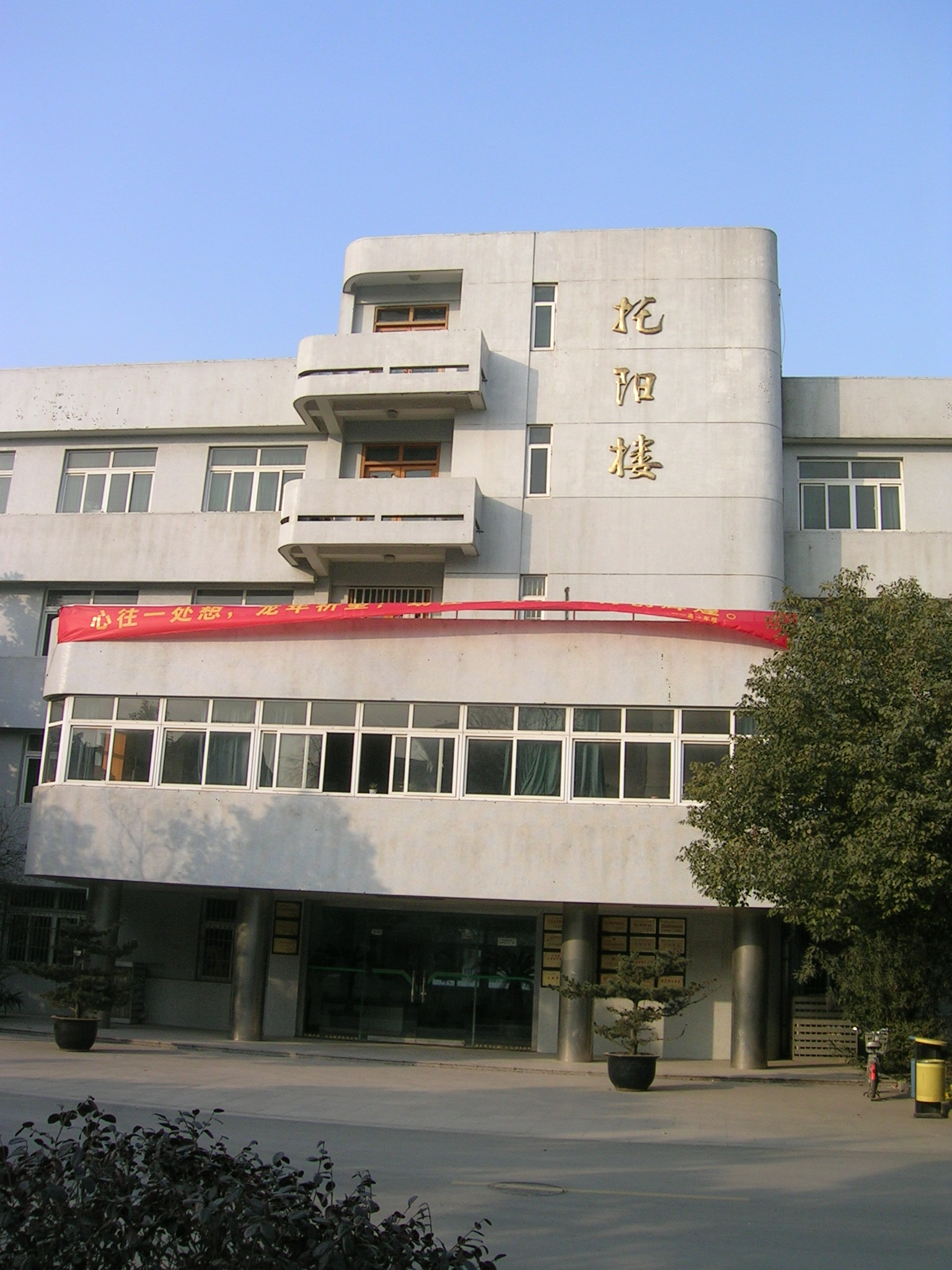
Tuoyang Building

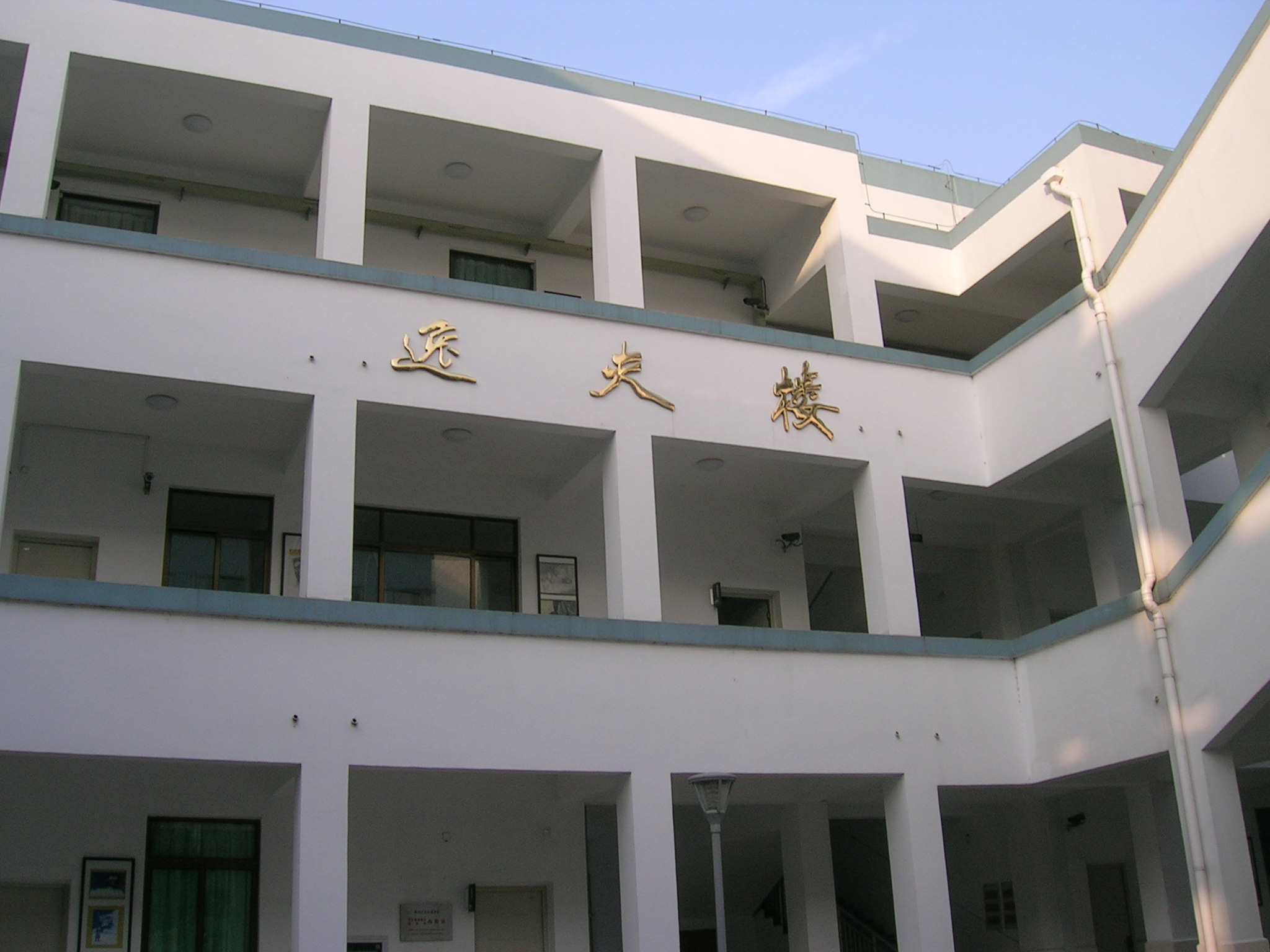
Yifu Building

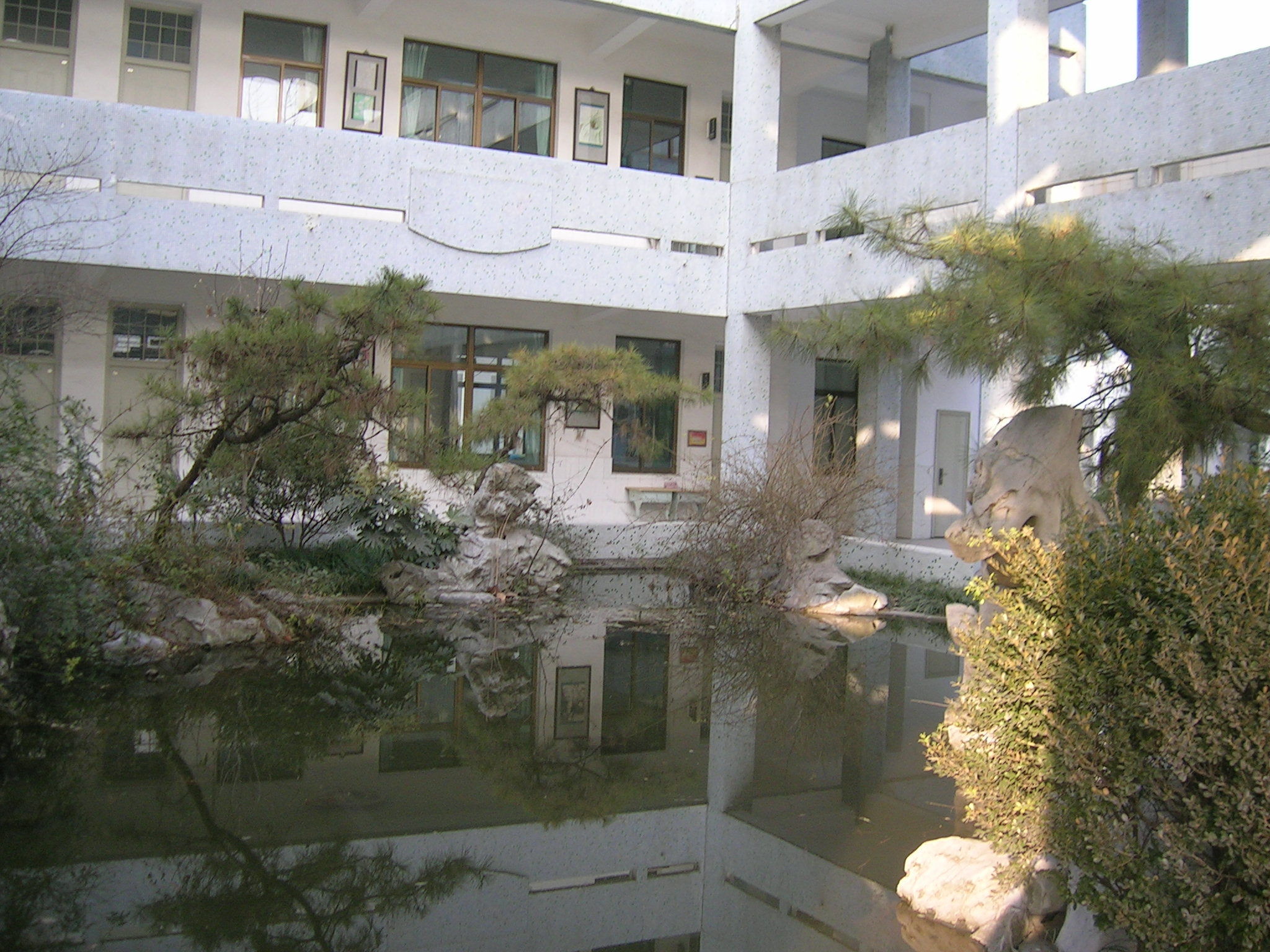
Chuying Building

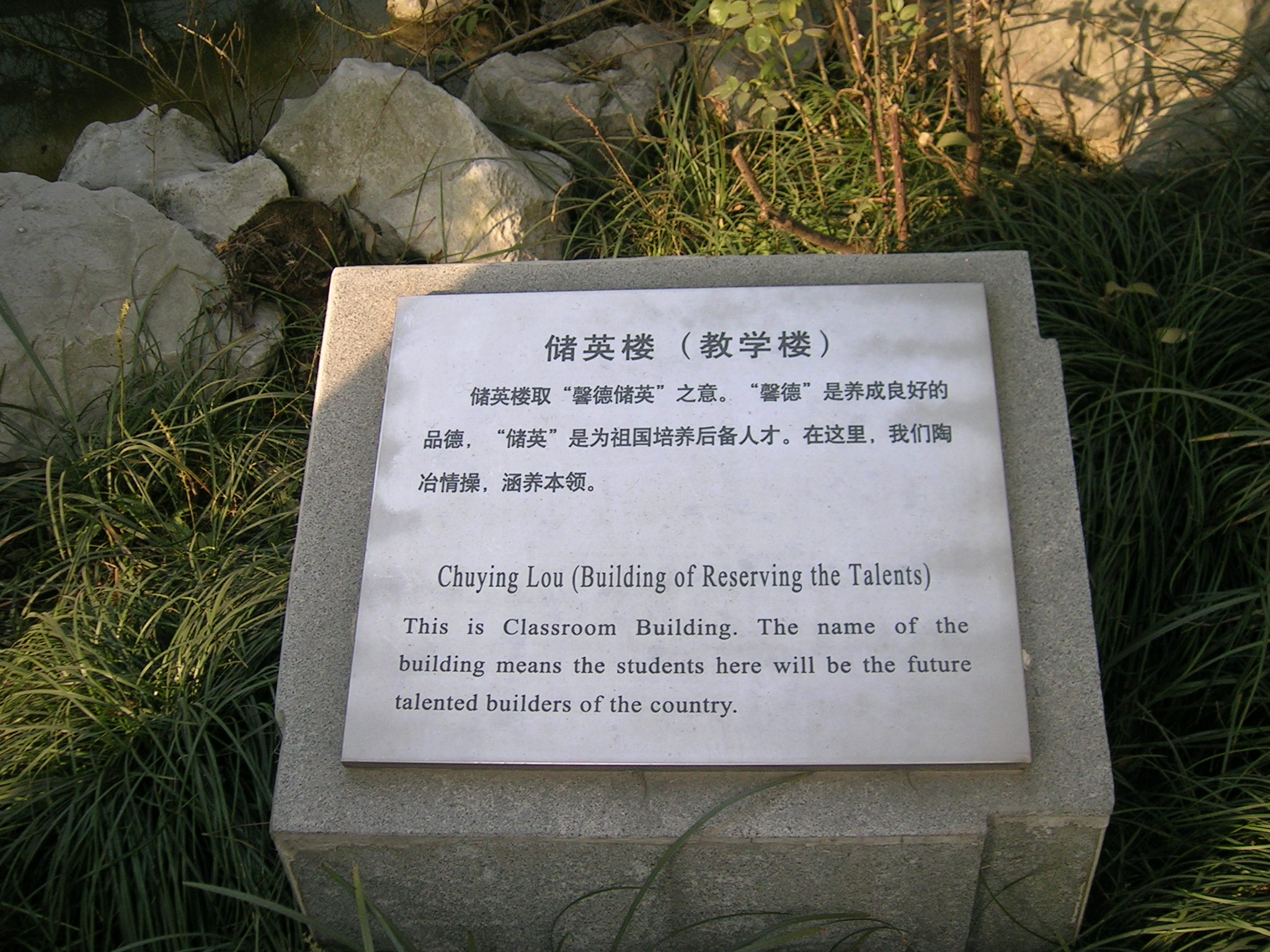
The explanation for the name of Chuying building
