= Yangshou =

Yangshou 杨寿镇
- Town
- Location in Jiangsu
- Coordinates: 32°25′3″N 119°19′33″E
- Country: People's Republic of China
- Province: Jiangsu
- Prefecture-level city: Yangzhou
- District: Hanjiang District
- Time zone: UTC+8 (China Standard)

Yangshou (simplified Chinese: 杨寿; traditional Chinese: 楊壽; pinyin: Yángshòu) is a town in Hanjiang District, Yangzhou, Jiangsu, China. As of 2020, it administers one residential neighborhood (Yangshou) and the following seven villages:

- Dongxing Village (东兴村)
- Dunliu Village (墩留村)
- Fangji Village (方集村)
- Xinlong Village (新龙村)
- Baonü Village (宝女村)
- Aiguo Village (爱国村)
- Yonghe Village (永和村)
