= Hanshang Subdistrict =

Subdistrict of Yangzhou, Jiangsu, China

Coordinates: 32°23′14″N 119°23′35″E

Hanshang Subdistrict is a subdistrict in Hanjiang District, Yangzhou, Jiangsu, China. It is the most urbanized subdistrict in Hanjiang District. Transportation in Hanshang Subdistrict is convenient. Hanshang Subdistrict is subdivided into Fengzhuang Community, Lanzhuang Community, Wuli Community, Jiaqiao Community and Wenchang Community.
