= Tongguan District =

Tongguan 铜官区
- District
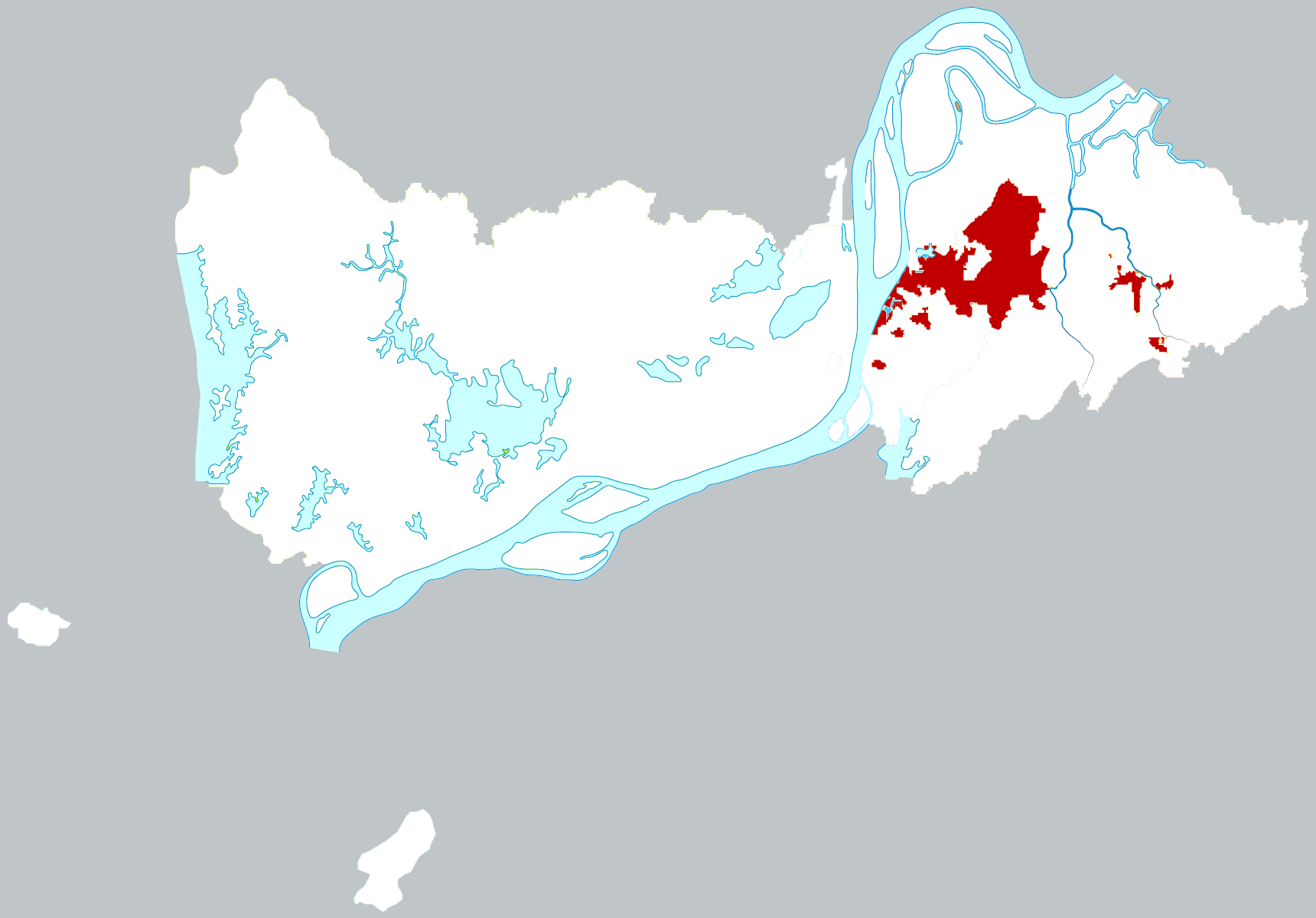
- Tongguan in Tongling
- Coordinates: 30°55′41″N 117°48′58″E
- Country: China
- Province: Anhui
- Prefecture-level city: Tongling

Area
  - Total: 98.1 km^{2} (37.9 sq mi)

Population (2020)
  - Total: 450,949
  - Density: 4,600/km^{2} (11,900/sq mi)
- Time zone: UTC+8 (China Standard)

Tongguan District (simplified Chinese: 铜官区; traditional Chinese: 銅官區; pinyin: Tóngguān Qū) is an urban district under the administration of the city of Tongling, Anhui Province, China. It has a total area of 83 square kilometres (32 sq mi), and a population of approximately 402,062. The district's postal code is 244000 and 244031. Tongguan District was established after the merge of Tongguanshan District and Shizishan District in October 2015.

== Administrative divisions ==
Tongguan District administers 20 subdistricts, 1 town and 2 others:

- Dongjiao Subdistrict 东郊街道
- Xincheng Subdistrict 新城街道
- Xihu Town 西湖镇
- Tongling Economic and Technological Development Zone 铜陵经济技术开发区
- Tongling Shizishan High-tech Industrial Development Zone 铜陵狮子山高新技术产业开发区
- Tianjinghu Shequ Subdistrict 天井湖社区街道
- Yinghu Shequ Subdistrict 映湖社区街道
- Wusong Shequ Subdistrict 五松社区街道
- Renmin Shequ Subdistrict 人民社区街道
- Xingfu Shequ Subdistrict 幸福社区街道
- Guantang Shequ Subdistrict 官塘社区街道
- Xueyuan Shequ Subdistrict 学苑社区街道
- Yangguang Shequ Subdistrict 阳光社区街道
- Youhao Shequ Subdistrict 友好社区街道
- Luoshishan Shequ Subdistrict 螺蛳山社区街道
- Lucai Shequ Subdistrict 露采社区街道
- Jinkouling Shequ Subdistrict 金口岭社区街道
- Yaoshan Shequ Subdistrict 鹞山社区街道
- Chaoyang Shequ Subdistrict 朝阳社区街道
- Binjiang Shequ Subdistrict 滨江社区街道
- Jinshan Shequ Subdistrict 金山社区街道
- Shizishan Shequ Subdistrict 狮子山社区街道
- Lixin Shequ Subdistrict 立新社区街道
