= Yangmiao, Jiangsu =

Yangmiao 杨庙镇
- Town
- Location in Jiangsu
- Coordinates: 32°25′3″N 119°19′33″E
- Country: People's Republic of China
- Province: Jiangsu
- Prefecture-level city: Yangzhou
- District: Hanjiang District
- Time zone: UTC+8 (China Standard)

Yangmiao (simplified Chinese: 杨庙; traditional Chinese: 楊廟; pinyin: Yángmiào) is a town in Hanjiang District, Yangzhou, Jiangsu, China. As of 2020, it administers one residential neighborhood (Yangmiao) and the following eight villages:

- Yangmiao Village
- Huaping Village (花瓶村)
- Shuangmiao Village (双庙村)
- Youyi Village (友谊村)
- Xinyang Village (新杨村)
- Yanshanhe Village (沿山河村)
- Cangjie Village (仓颉村)
- Zhaozhuang Village (赵庄村)
