= Gongdao =

Gongdao 公道镇
- Town
- Location in Jiangsu
- Coordinates: 32°35′18″N 119°20′38″E
- Country: People's Republic of China
- Province: Jiangsu
- Prefecture-level city: Yangzhou
- District: Hanjiang District
- Time zone: UTC+8 (China Standard)

Gongdao (Chinese: 公道; pinyin: Gōngdào) is a town in Hanjiang District, Yangzhou, Jiangsu, China. As of 2020, it administers three residential neighborhoods, Huayuan (花园), Kuixing (魁星), and Chi'an (赤岸), as well as the following 11 villages:

- Taiping Village (太平村)
- Sangyuan Village (桑园村)
- Ouyang Village (欧阳村)
- Chi'an Village (赤岸村)
- Guying Village (谷营村)
- Hubin Village (湖滨村)
- Baishu Village (柏树村)
- Nianqiao Village (埝桥村)
- Hexi Village (河西村)
- Sanjie Village (三界村)
- Hedong Village (河东村)
