= Huaisi =

Huaisi 槐泗镇
- Town
- Location in Jiangsu
- Coordinates: 32°27′18″N 119°26′30″E
- Country: People's Republic of China
- Province: Jiangsu
- Prefecture-level city: Yangzhou
- District: Hanjiang District
- Time zone: UTC+8 (China Standard)

Huaisi (Chinese: 槐泗; pinyin: Huáisì) is a town in Hanjiang District, Yangzhou, Jiangsu, China. As of 2020, it administers two residential neighborhoods, Jiudian (酒甸) and Jufu (聚福), as well as the following 13 villages:

- Yunhe Village (运河村)
- Shenying Village (沈营村)
- Fenglai Village (凤来村)
- Longwei Village (龙尾村)
- Tuanjie Village (团结村)
- Linqiao Village (林桥村)
- Xuxiang Village (许巷村)
- Xiaohu Village (肖胡村)
- Chengou Village (陈沟村)
- Chenyuan Village (陈院村)
- Jiudian Village (酒甸村)
- Baojia Village (包家村)
- Hangzhuang Village (杭庄村)
