= Tai'an, Jiangsu =

Town in Yangzhou, Jiangsu, China

Tai'an is a town in Hanjiang District, Yangzhou, Jiangsu, China.
