= Guazhou, Jiangsu =

Guazhou 瓜洲镇
- Town
- Location in Jiangsu
- Coordinates: 32°15′10″N 119°23′0″E
- Country: People's Republic of China
- Province: Jiangsu
- Prefecture-level city: Yangzhou
- District: Hanjiang District
- Time zone: UTC+8 (China Standard)

Guazhou (Chinese: 瓜洲; pinyin: Guāzhōu) is a town in Hanjiang District, Yangzhou, Jiangsu, China. As of 2020, it administers two residential neighborhoods: Chenjiawan (陈家湾) and Silipu (四里铺), as well as three villages: Guazhou Village, Juzhuang Village (鞠庄村), and Junqiao Village (军桥村).
