= Meiling Subdistrict, Yangzhou =

Meiling Subdistrict 梅岭街道
- Subdistrict
- Location in Jiangsu
- Coordinates: 32.4078°N 119.4410°E
- Country: People's Republic of China
- Province: Jiangsu
- Prefecture-level city: Yangzhou
- District: Hanjiang District
- Time zone: UTC+8 (China Standard)

Meiling Subdistrict (Chinese: 梅岭街道; pinyin: Méilǐng Jiēdào) is a subdistrict in Hanjiang District, Yangzhou, Jiangsu, China. As of 2018, it has 7 residential communities under its administration.

== See also ==
- List of township-level divisions of Jiangsu
