= Tongling =

Tongling 铜陵市
- Prefecture-level city
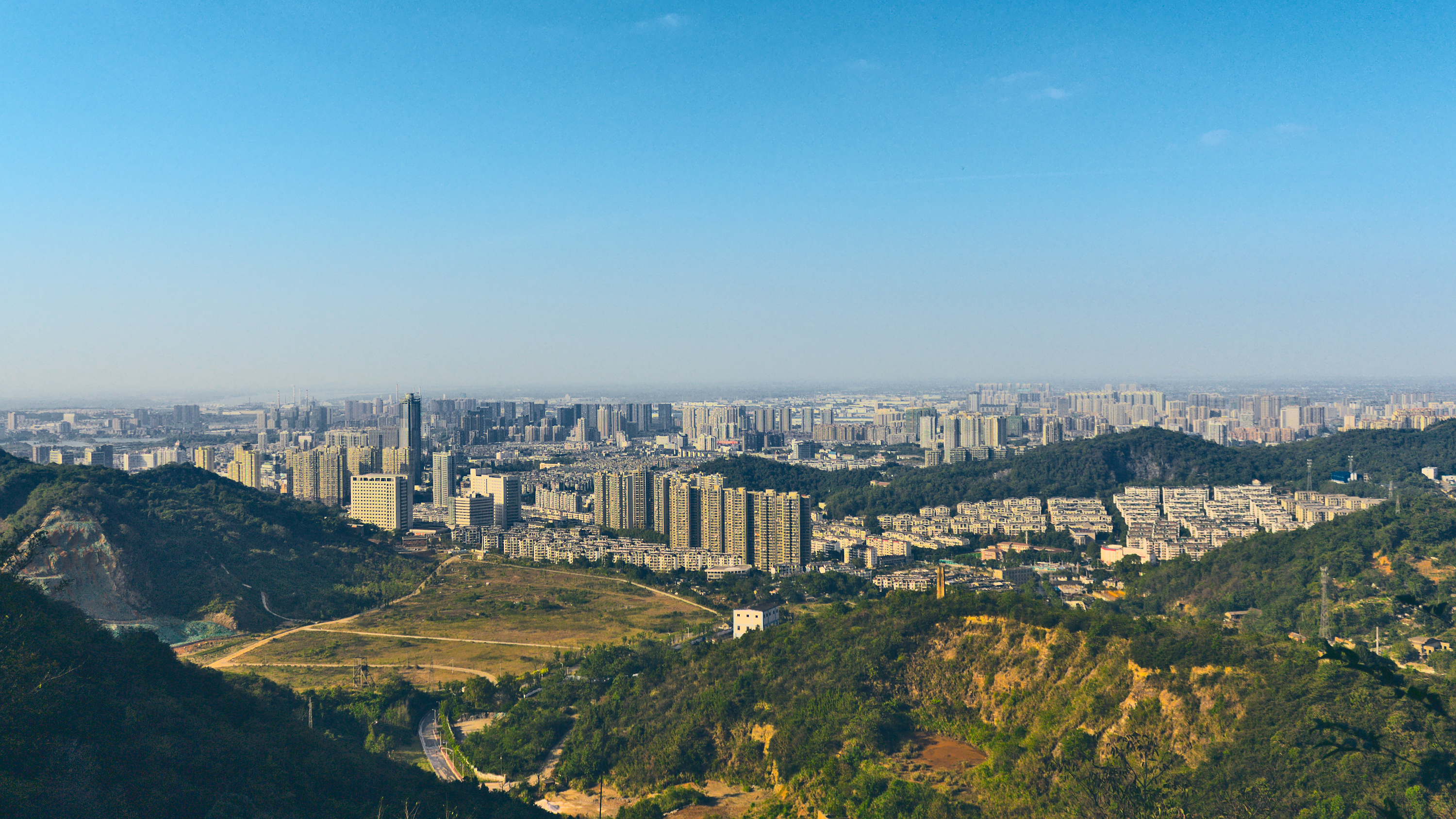
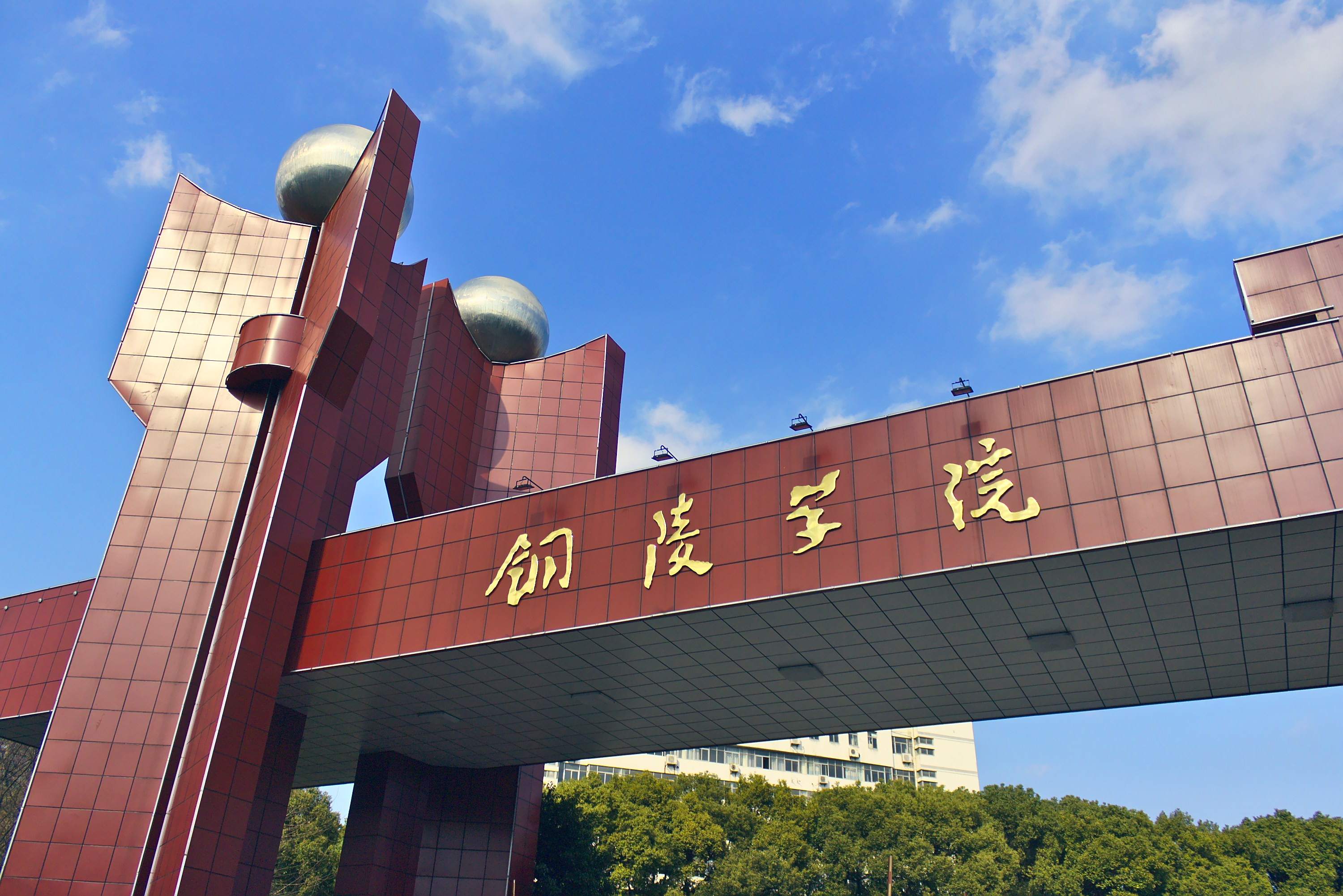
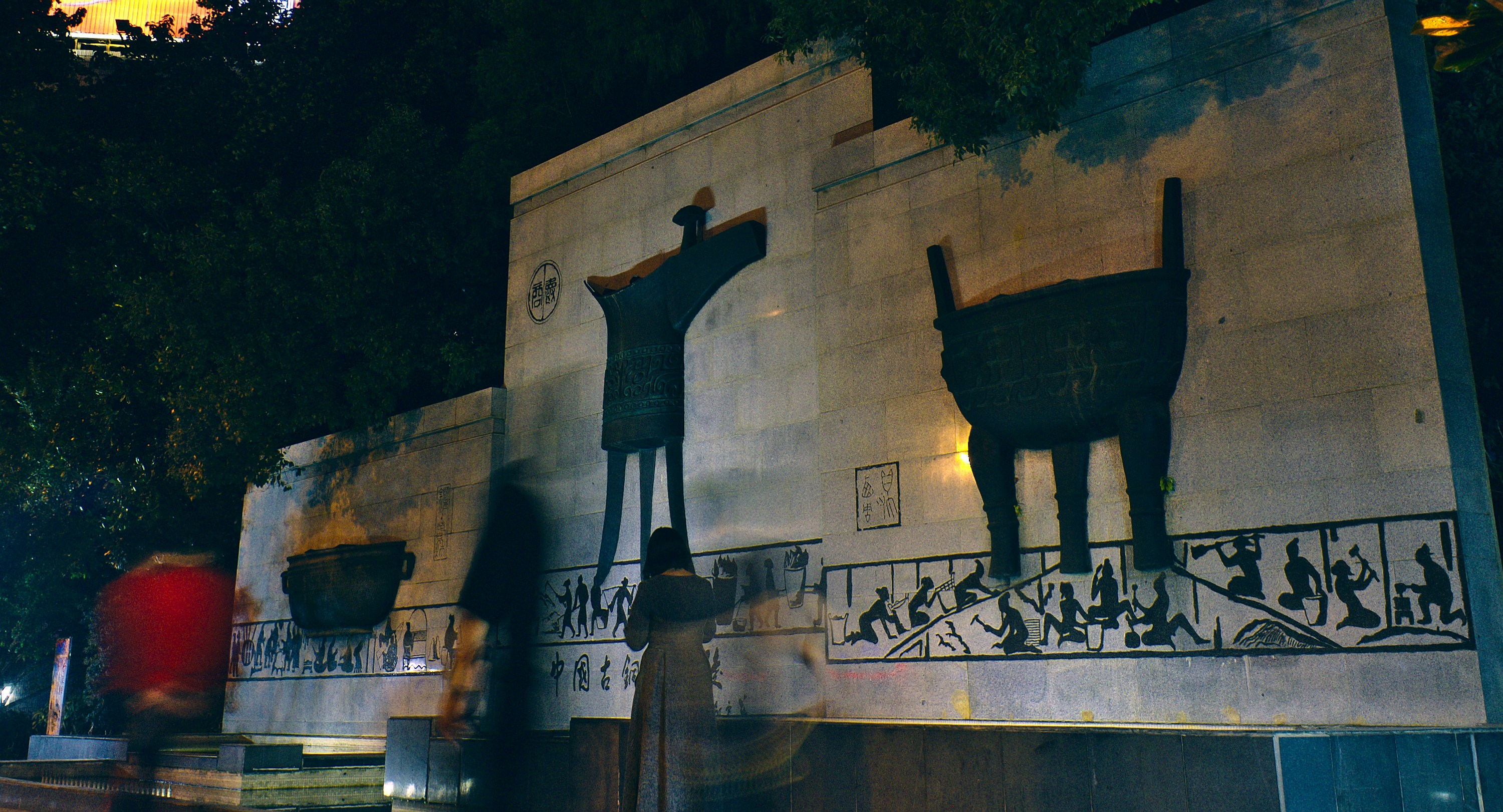
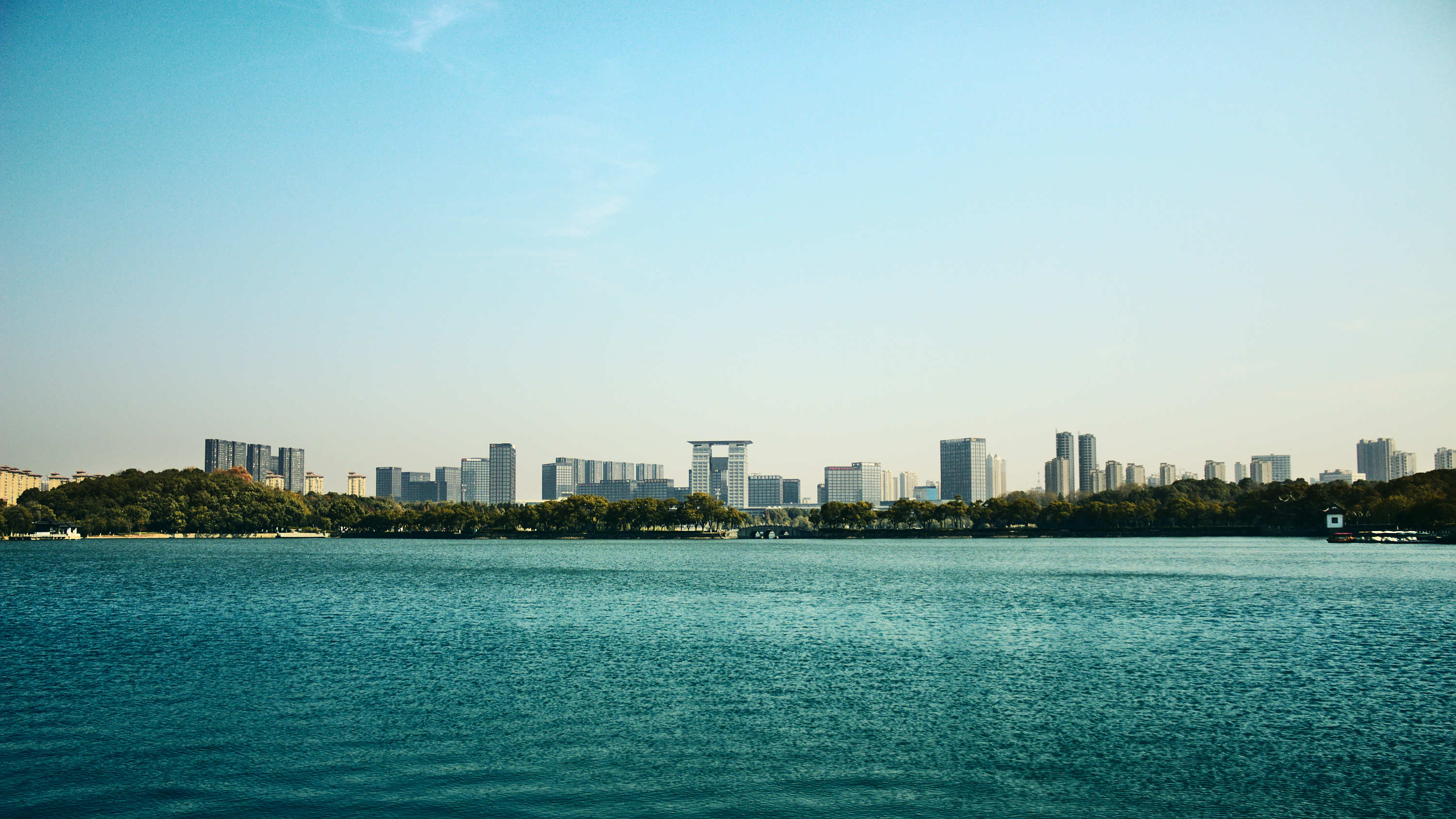
- Clockwise from top: skyline, wall sculpture depicting Tongling as the "capital of copper", Tongling from the far side of the Yangtze, and the University of Tongling.

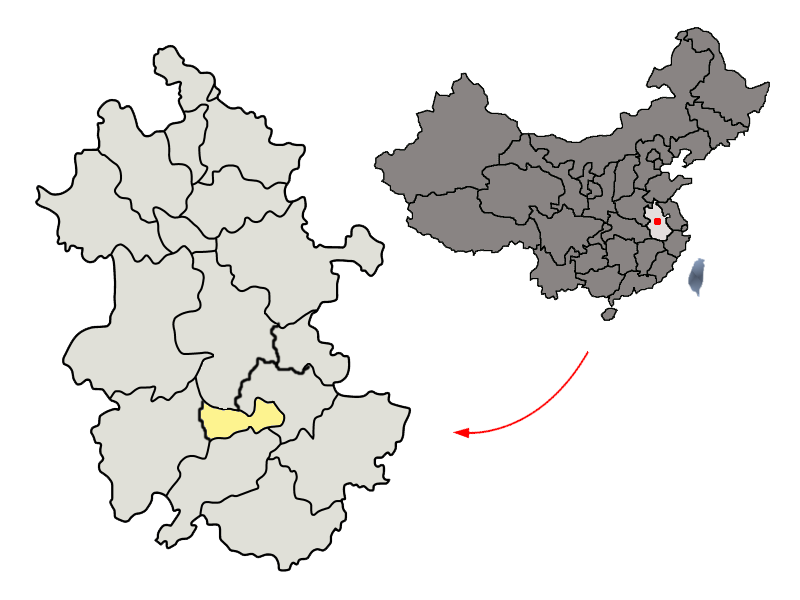
- Location of Tongling City jurisdiction in Anhui
- Coordinates (Tongling municipal government): 30°56′42″N 117°48′40″E
- Country: People's Republic of China
- Province: Anhui
- County-level divisions: 3 districts 1 county
- Municipal seat: Tongguan District

Government
  - CPC Secretary: Li Meng (李猛)
  - Mayor: Hu Qisheng (胡启生)

Area
  - Prefecture-level city: 2,982 km^{2} (1,151 sq mi)
  - Urban: 1,489.8 km^{2} (575.2 sq mi)
  - Metro: 1,489.8 km^{2} (575.2 sq mi)

Population (2020 Census)
  - Prefecture-level city: 1,311,726
  - Density: 439.9/km^{2} (1,139/sq mi)
  - Urban: 842,675
  - Urban density: 565.63/km^{2} (1,465.0/sq mi)
  - Metro: 842,675
  - Metro density: 565.63/km^{2} (1,465.0/sq mi)

GDP
  - Prefecture-level city: CN¥ 116.6 billion US$ 14.5 billion
  - Per capita: CN¥ 89,248; US$ 13,834
- Time zone: UTC+8 (China Standard)
- Postal code: 244000
- Area code: 0562
- ISO 3166 code: CN-AH-07
- License plate prefix: 皖G
- Website: tl.gov.cn (in Chinese)

Tongling (simplified Chinese: 铜陵; traditional Chinese: 銅陵; pinyin: Tónglíng; Wade–Giles: T'ung-ling; lit. 'Copper Hillock') is a prefecture-level city in southern Anhui province of China. A river port along the Yangtze River, Tongling borders Wuhu to the east, Chizhou to the southwest and Anqing to the west.

As of the 2020 census, its population was 1,311,726 inhabitants whom 842,675 lived in the built-up (or metro) area made of 3 urban districts. At the end of 2024 and the beginning of 2025, the permanent population will be 1.302 million. The asteroid 12418 Tongling was named after the city.

== History ==
Tongling has been famous as a beautiful mountain city since its origins in the Han dynasty over 1500 years ago. Owing to its copper and tin deposits, it was an important center in the past for bronze production. The scale of industrial activity gradually increased through the Ming (1368–1644) and Qing (1644–1911) dynasties, the Japanese occupation (1938–45), and especially under the Communist government since 1949. Tongling has a long history and produced many talented people. It is one of the important birthplaces of China's bronze culture. The history of copper mining and smelting has lasted for more than 3,000 years without interruption. Tongling has been a mining center since the 7th century CE. While it has only been an industrial city for the second half of the 20th century.

== Geography ==
Tongling is located in southern Anhui on the southern (right) bank of the lower reaches of the Yangtze River, with latitude ranging from 30° 45' 12" to 31° 07' 56" N and longitude ranging from 117° 42' 00" to 118° 10' 06" E; the maximal north–south extent is 42.5 kilometres (26.4 mi), and the greatest east–west width is 40.6 km (25.2 mi). It borders Fanchang County to the southeast, Qingyang County and Nanling County to the south, Guichi District of Chizhou to the southwest, and, northwest across the Yangtze, Wuwei County and Zongyang County.

=== Climate ===
Tongling City has a northern subtropical humid monsoon climate. The climate in Tongling is warm and humid, with heavy rain in spring and summer, hot summer, dry autumn, mild winter, long frost-free period and distinct four seasons.

Climate data for Tongling, elevation 11 m (36 ft), (1991–2020 normals, extremes 1981–present)
Month	Jan	Feb	Mar	Apr	May	Jun	Jul	Aug	Sep	Oct	Nov	Dec	Year
Record high °C (°F)	21.9 (71.4)	28.2 (82.8)	32.7 (90.9)	33.5 (92.3)	35.1 (95.2)	38.2 (100.8)	40.1 (104.2)	40.1 (104.2)	38.5 (101.3)	33.0 (91.4)	28.8 (83.8)	22.1 (71.8)	40.1 (104.2)
Mean daily maximum °C (°F)	7.6 (45.7)	10.6 (51.1)	15.5 (59.9)	21.9 (71.4)	27.0 (80.6)	29.5 (85.1)	32.9 (91.2)	32.4 (90.3)	28.2 (82.8)	22.9 (73.2)	16.7 (62.1)	10.1 (50.2)	21.3 (70.3)
Daily mean °C (°F)	3.9 (39.0)	6.5 (43.7)	11.0 (51.8)	17.1 (62.8)	22.2 (72.0)	25.5 (77.9)	28.9 (84.0)	28.2 (82.8)	23.9 (75.0)	18.4 (65.1)	12.2 (54.0)	6.2 (43.2)	17.0 (62.6)
Mean daily minimum °C (°F)	1.2 (34.2)	3.4 (38.1)	7.5 (45.5)	13.2 (55.8)	18.4 (65.1)	22.3 (72.1)	25.7 (78.3)	25.2 (77.4)	20.7 (69.3)	14.9 (58.8)	8.9 (48.0)	3.2 (37.8)	13.7 (56.7)
Record low °C (°F)	−7.8 (18.0)	−8.9 (16.0)	−3.1 (26.4)	3.0 (37.4)	9.2 (48.6)	13.0 (55.4)	19.1 (66.4)	16.7 (62.1)	12.8 (55.0)	4.6 (40.3)	−3.8 (25.2)	−8.2 (17.2)	−8.9 (16.0)
Average precipitation mm (inches)	74.8 (2.94)	82.7 (3.26)	121.4 (4.78)	133.0 (5.24)	147.8 (5.82)	244.7 (9.63)	198.4 (7.81)	130.5 (5.14)	83.3 (3.28)	65.5 (2.58)	71.4 (2.81)	48.0 (1.89)	1,401.5 (55.18)
Average precipitation days (≥ 0.1 mm)	11.5	10.9	13.6	11.9	12.3	13.2	11.9	11.9	9.1	8.4	9.3	8.3	132.3
Average snowy days	4.5	2.4	1.0	0	0	0	0	0	0	0	0.2	1.6	9.7
Average relative humidity (%)	77	76	74	73	74	79	78	80	79	76	77	75	77
Mean monthly sunshine hours	105.6	112.3	136.6	163.1	179.7	156.9	213.4	199.2	160.3	160.0	137.8	126.8	1,851.7
Percentage possible sunshine	33	36	37	42	42	37	50	49	44	46	44	40	42
Source: China Meteorological Administration all-time January high

== Administration ==
The prefecture-level city of Tongling administers 4 county-level divisions, including 3 districts and 1 county.

- Tongguan District (铜官区)
- Jiao District (郊区)
- Yi'an District (义安区)
- Zongyang County (枞阳县)

In 2012, the provincial government made plans to cede Zongyang County from Anqing City to Tongling City, in order to grant the latter land across the Yangtze.

Map
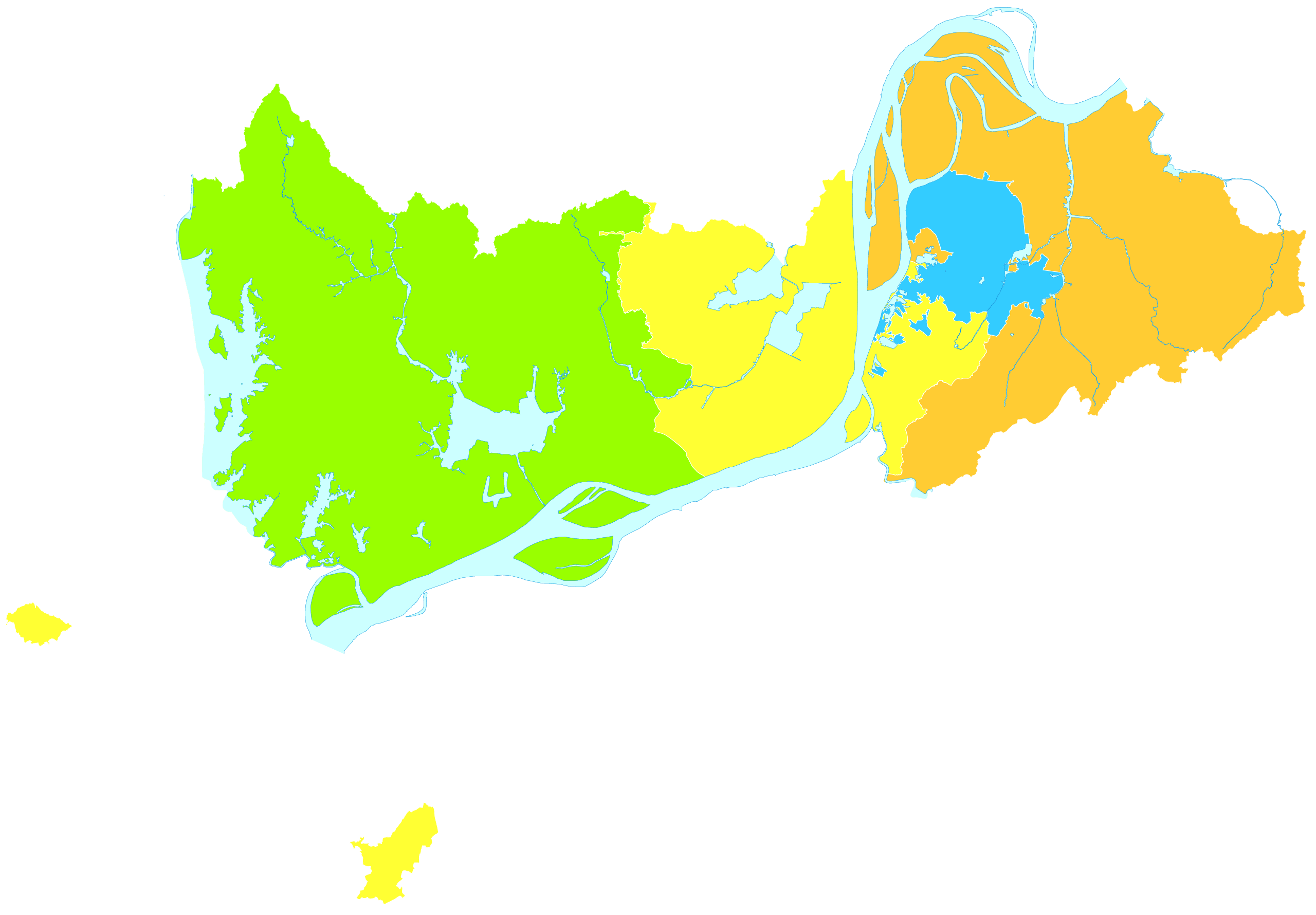

Defunct divisions

- Tongguanshan District (铜官山区)
- Shizishan District (狮子山区)

== Transport ==
As of November 2017, Tongling has two bridges across the Yangtze River.

The Tongling Yangtze River Bridge is a double-deck cable-stayed and suspension coordinated system bridge with a total length of 11.88 kilometers and a main span of 988 meters. It has three river crossing functions: expressway, intercity railway, and freight railway.

=== Rail ===
Tongling is served by the Nanjing–Tongling, Tongling–Jiujiang, Lujiang-Tongling Railways, Nanjing–Anqing Intercity Railway and Hefei-Fuzhou High-Speed Railway.

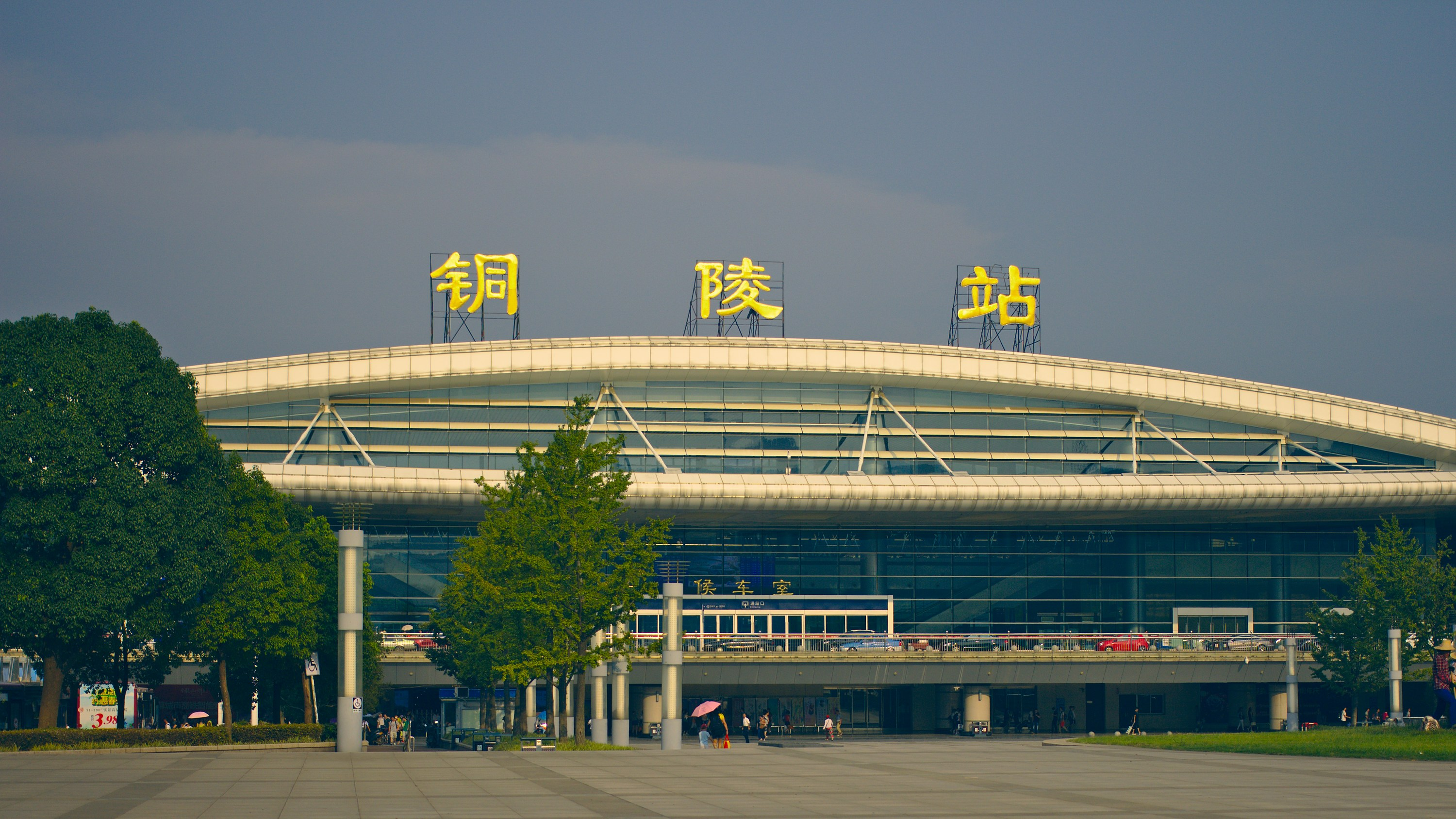
Tongling Station

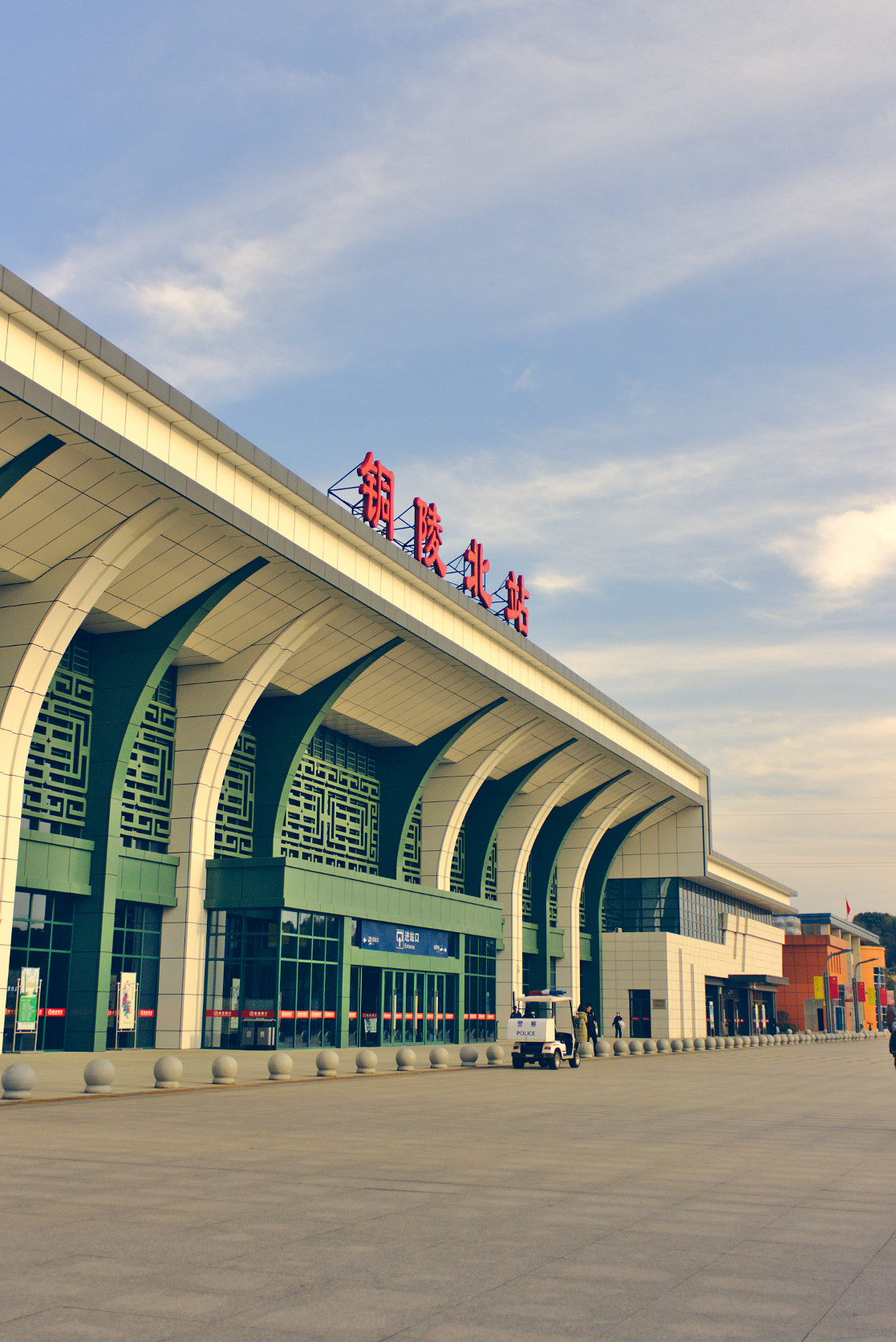
Tongling North Station

== Twin towns ==
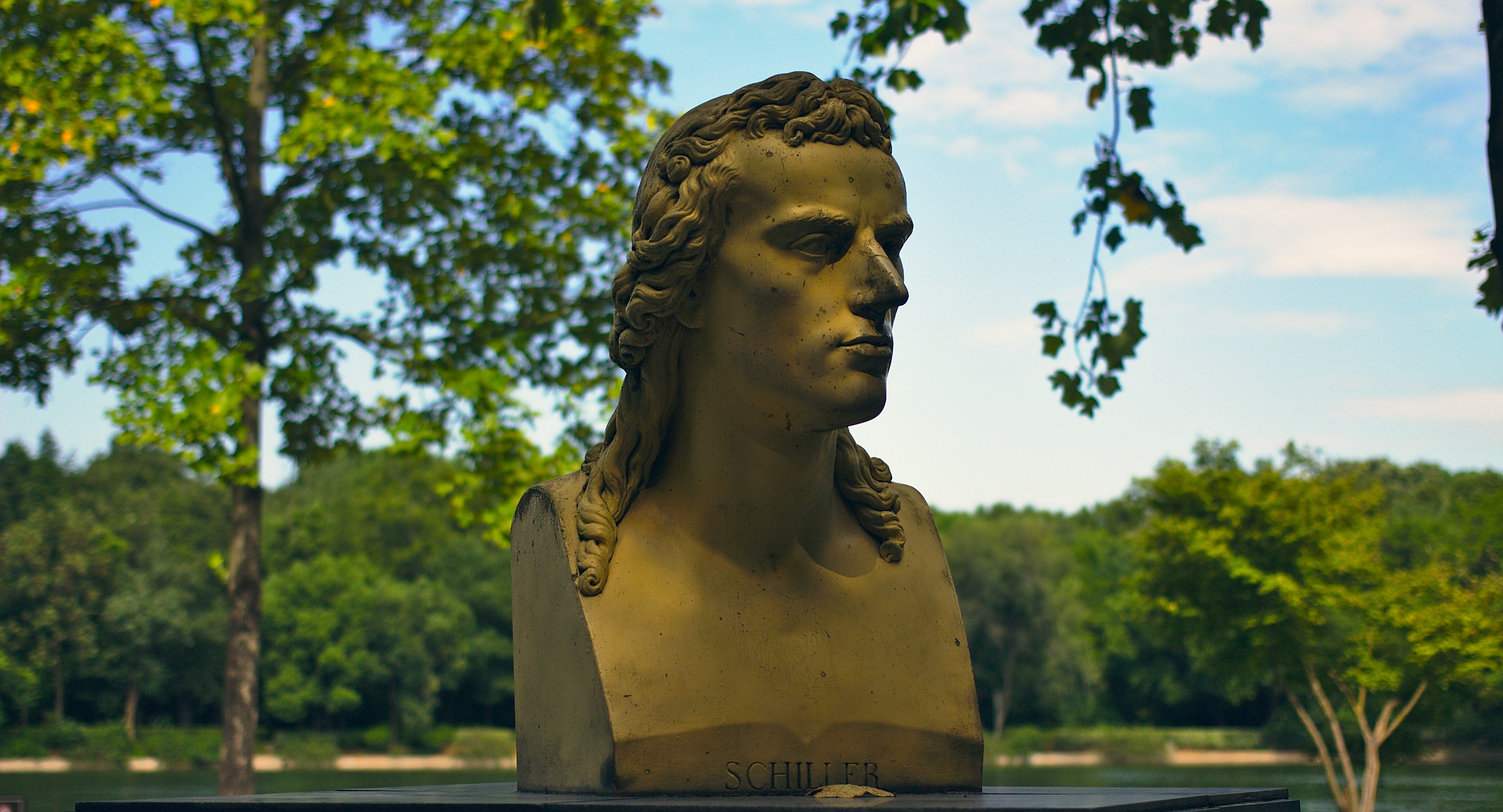
Statue of Schiller located at Tongling Tianjinghu park

The contract of town-twinning with the city of Marbach am Neckar in Baden-Württemberg, Germany was established in 1990 and was among the first Sino-German town-twinnings, or sister city relationships. One lady citizen of Marbach am Neckar has been awarded honorary citizenship of Tongling City in 2005, recognizing her relentless effort to keep up the town-twinning. Marbach is the birthplace of the famous German poet Friedrich Schiller (1759–1805), as a symbol of friendship a statue was erected in local Tianjinhu-Lake-Park.

Tongling has been twinned with the Borough of Halton in England since 1997. A Chinese friendship garden was created in the grounds of Runcorn Town Hall in 2006, including a bronze statue gifted by the twin city of Tongling.

== Culture ==
Tongling has built 5 public libraries, 5 cultural centers, 2 museums, 1 art gallery and 1 theater.

The Tongling Museum is a special museum with copper culture as its main theme. It fully displays the status that Tongling should have in the history of China's bronze civilization, and displays the development of copper culture and the prospects of the copper industry.

=== Local Products ===
Tongling is famous for a local specialty called white ginger, which has been grown in the area for over 2,000 years. The history of this plant goes back as far as the Spring and Autumn period. It is a major part of the cultural identity of Tongling.

The success of Tongling white ginger comes from three traditional farming techniques that are still used today. These include keeping the ginger seeds in special "ginger pavilions" (storage chambers) to help them sprout, planting on high ridges, and using bamboo or thatch to build shelters that provide shade during growth. Local farmers have turned this knowledge into a 24-character rhyming guide: "Deeply dig ridges, cut buds for sowing, erect shade-covering bamboo shelters, harvest by hand-pulling, store seeds in ginger pavilions, and stimulate germination with furnace heat". The step of "digging trenches and raising ridges" is usually done around the Qingming Festival to help the soil drain well.

Recently, in November 2023, the Food and Agriculture Organization recognized this system as a Globally Important Agricultural Heritage System. This shows the global importance of Tongling's farming traditions. Today, this white ginger industry helps local farmers earn more money while keeping ancient Chinese agricultural skills alive for the future.
