= Shuangqiao station =

Shuangqiao station can refer to:

- Shuangqiao station (Beijing Subway), a metro station in Beijing, China
- Shuangqiao railway station, a railway station in Beijing, China
- Shuangqiao station (Hangzhou Metro), a metro station in Hangzhou, China
- Shuangqiao station (Suzhou Metro), a metro station on Line 5 (Suzhou Metro) in Suzhou, China
- Shuangqiao Road station, a metro station in Chengdu, China
