= Hanjiang District, Yangzhou =

Hanjiang District 邗江区
- District
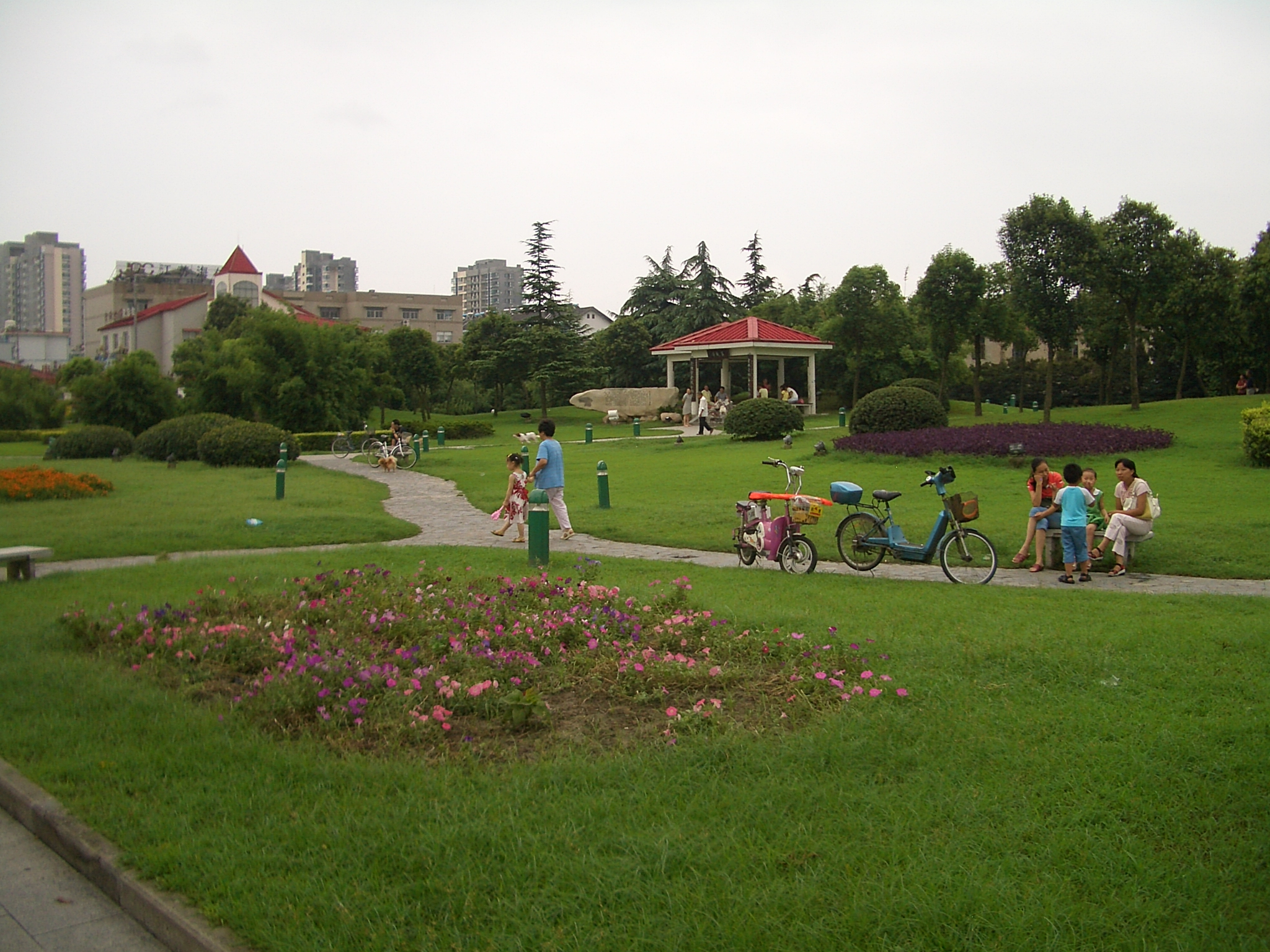
- Park at the intersection of Wenchang West Road (文昌西路) and Weiyang Road (维扬路; 維揚路)

- Location in Jiangsu
- Coordinates: 32°26′42″N 119°24′00″E
- Country: People's Republic of China
- Province: Jiangsu
- Prefecture-level city: Yangzhou

Area
  - Total: 552.68 km^{2} (213.39 sq mi)
- Elevation: 9 m (30 ft)

Population (2018)
  - Total: 706,800
  - Density: 1,279/km^{2} (3,312/sq mi)
- Time zone: UTC+8 (China Standard)
- Postal code: 225000
- Website: www.hj.gov.cn

Hanjiang District, Yangzhou
- Traditional Chinese: 邗江區
- Simplified Chinese: 邗江区
- Literal meaning: Han River District
Transcriptions
Standard Mandarin
- Hanyu Pinyin: Hánjiāng qū
- Wade–Giles: Han-chiang Ch'ü

Hanjiang District is one of the three districts of Yangzhou, Jiangsu Province, in eastern China. It is one of the two districts (along with Guangling District) that divide the prefecture's urbanized core. It includes roughly the western half of Yangzhou's central city and adjacent suburbs. The Yangtze River and the Grand Canal of China serve as the district's principal southern and eastern borders.

In the past, the northern part of Yangzhou's main urban area constituted the separate Weiyang District but, in late 2011, Weiyang District was abolished and merged into Hanjiang.

== Administrative divisions ==
Hanjiang District is divided to 10 subdistricts, 10 towns, and 3 townships:

10 Subdistricts

- Hanshang (邗上街道)
- Xinsheng (新盛街道)
- Jiangwang (蒋王街道)
- Chahe (汊河街道)
- Shuangqiao (双桥街道)
- Meiling (梅岭街道)
- Ganquan (甘泉街道)
- Shouxihu (瘦西湖街道)
- Yangzijin (扬子津街道)
- Wenhui (文汇街道)

10 Towns

- Gongdao (公道镇)
- Fangxiang (方巷镇)
- Huaisi (槐泗镇)
- Guazhou (瓜洲镇)
- Touqiao (头桥镇)
- Yangshou (杨寿镇)
- Tai'an (泰安镇)
- Yangmiao (杨庙镇)
- Xihu (西湖镇)
- Puxi (朴席镇)

3 Townships

- Pingshan (平山乡)
- Shuangqiao (双桥乡)
- Chengbei (城北乡)

== Gallery ==
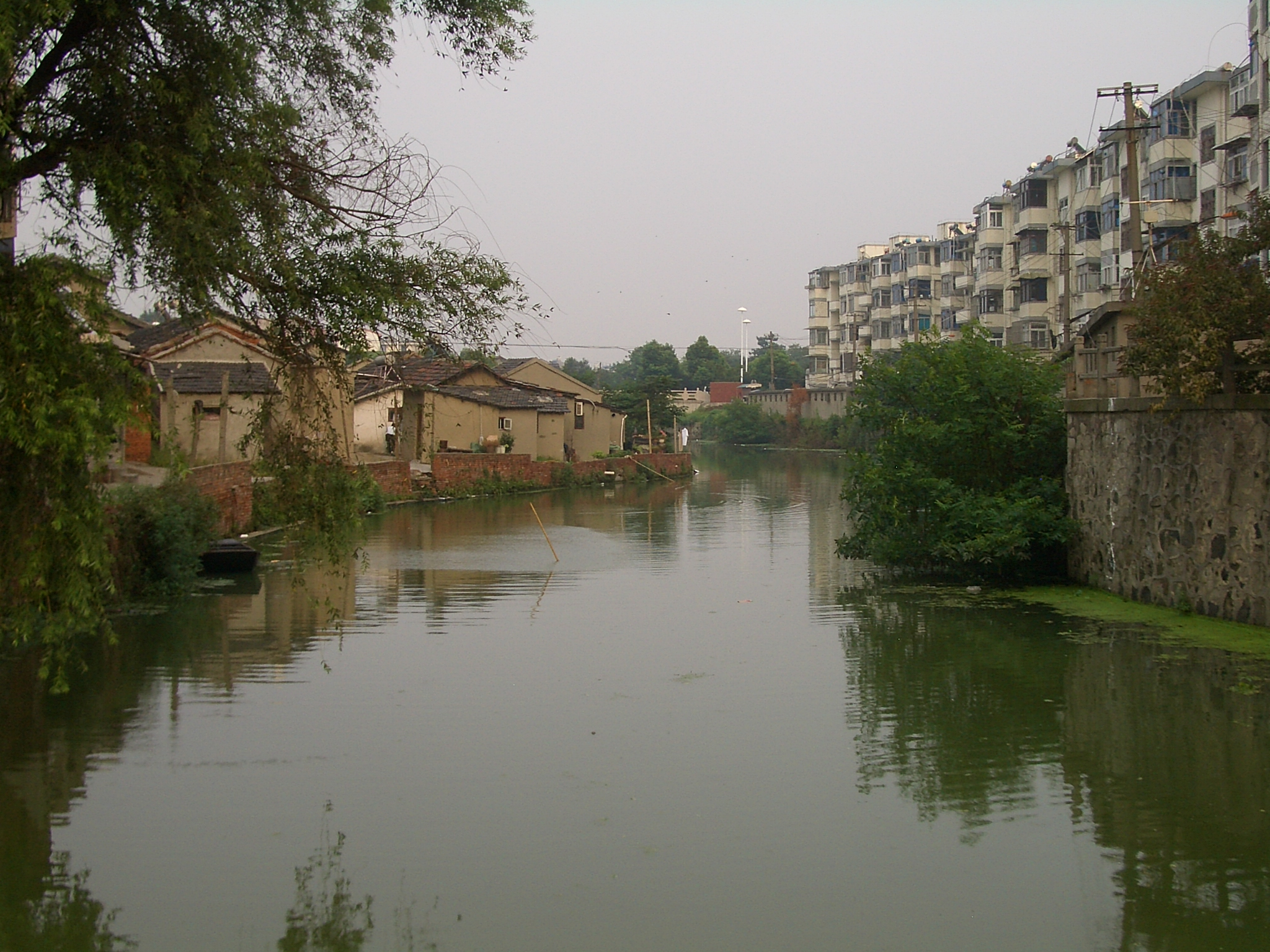
A residential area near Slender West Lake (Shouxihu)

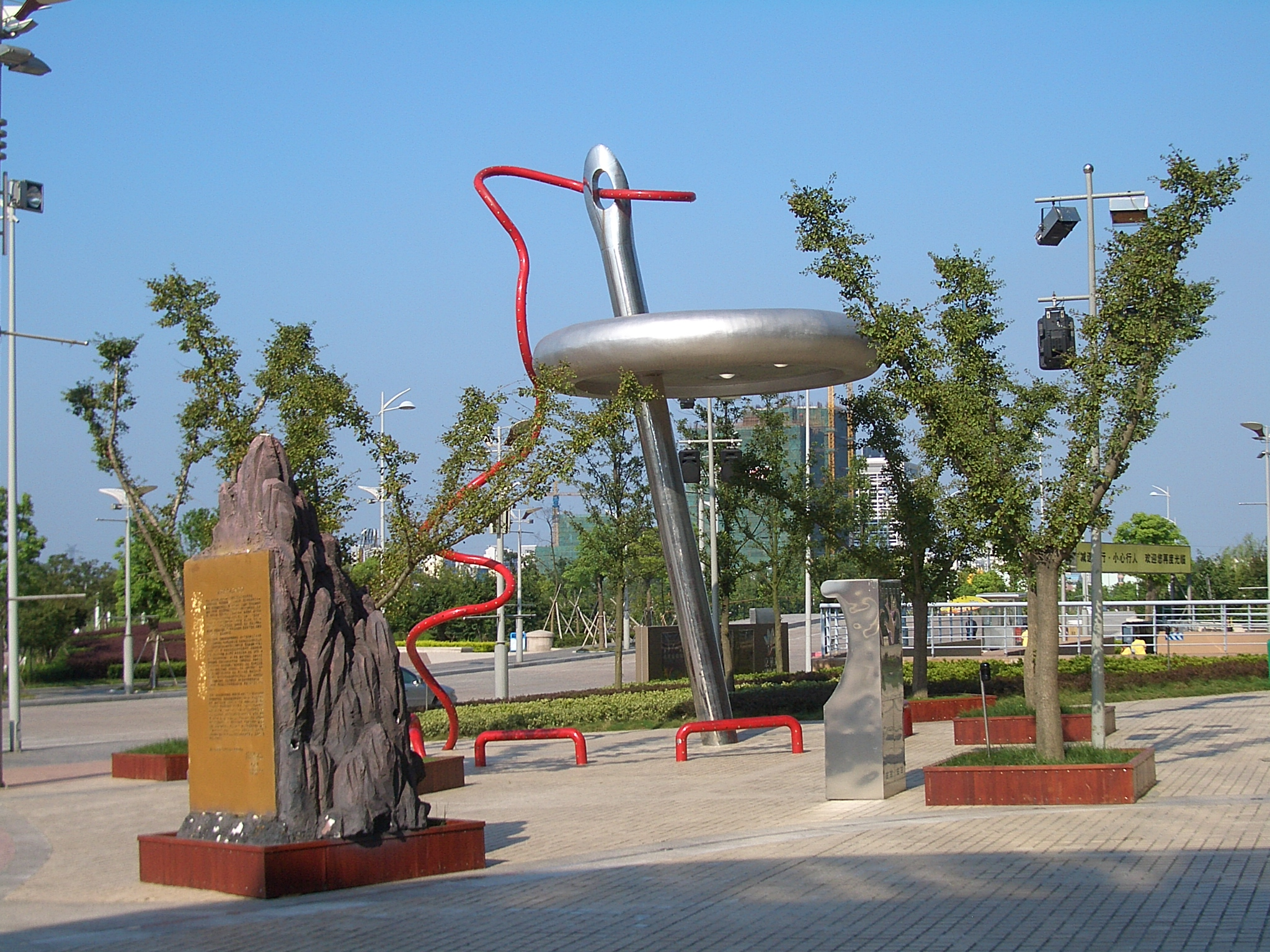
A public plaza near RT-Mart on Yangzhou's west side

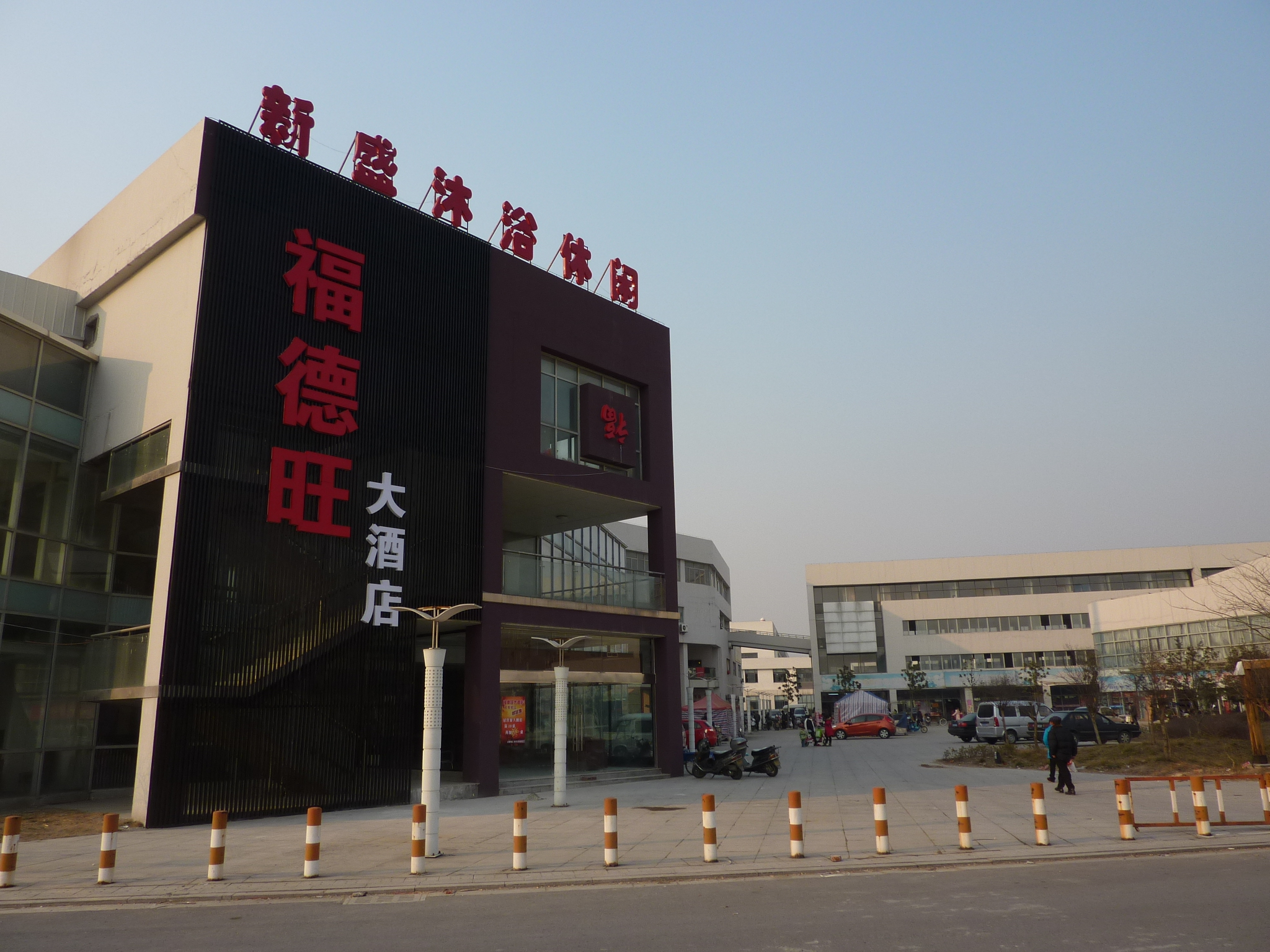
Xinsheng Subdistrict

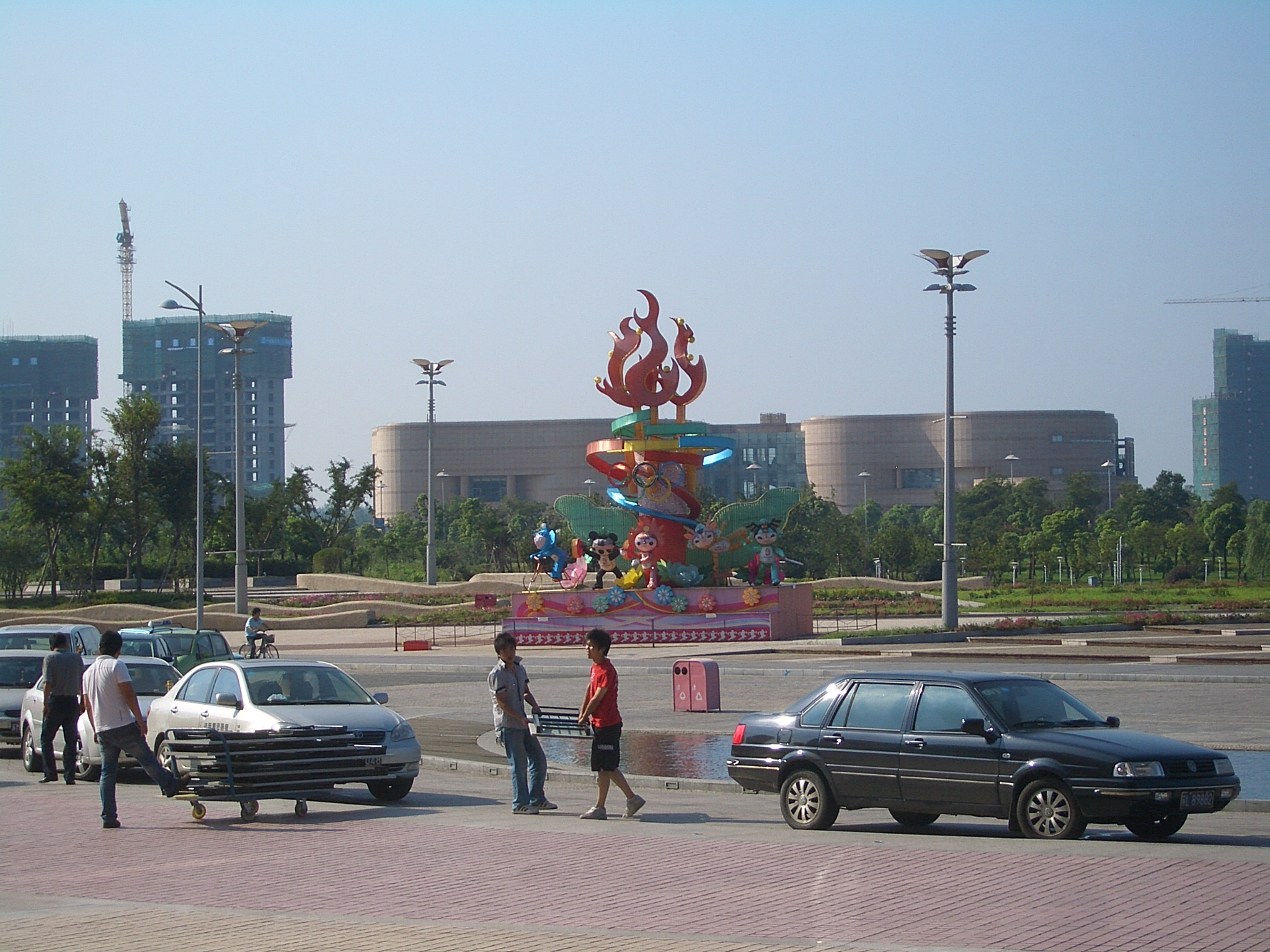
Yangzhou Museum

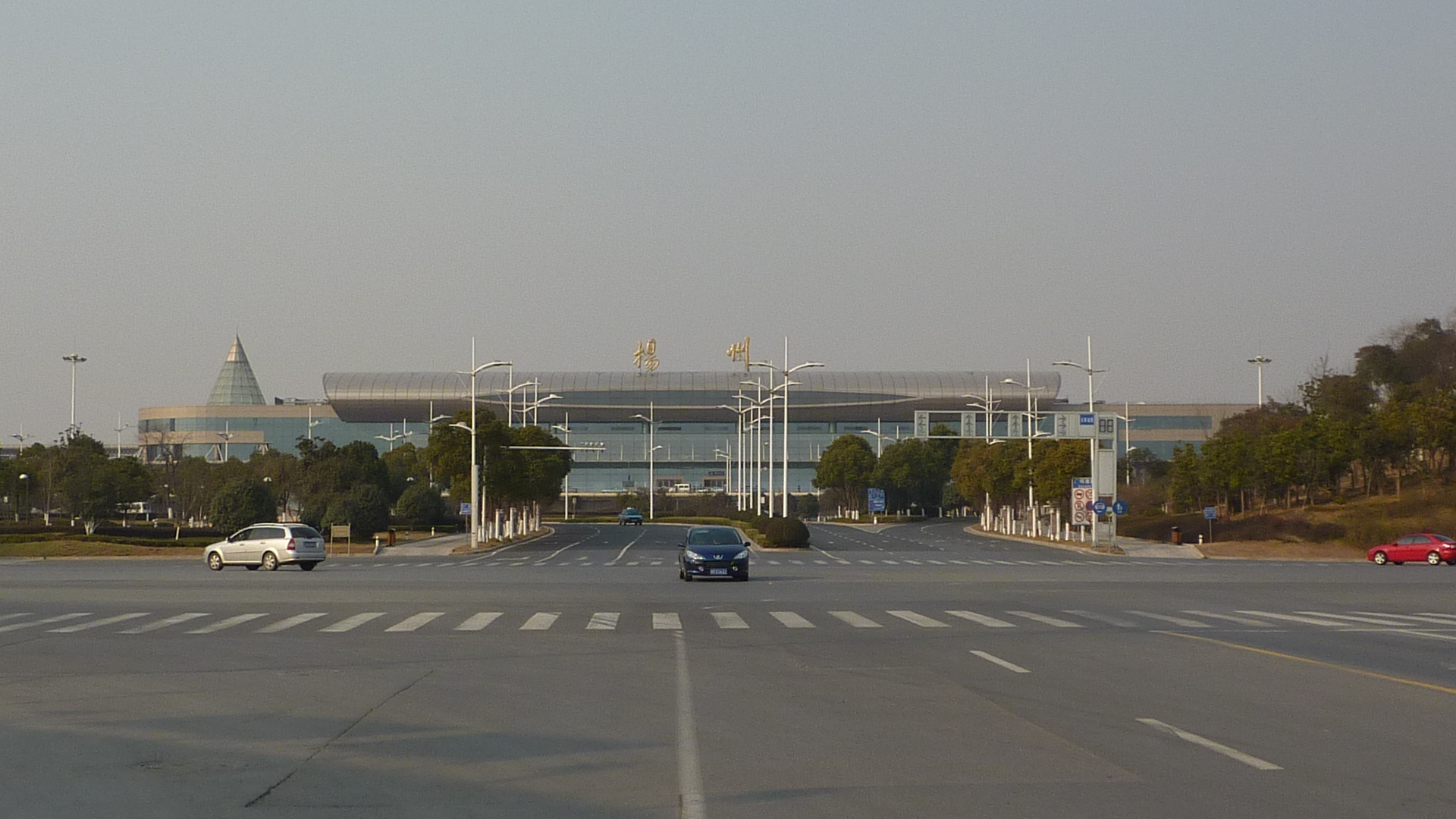
Yangzhou Railway Station on the Nanjing–Qidong Railway

== See also ==
- Other Hanjiangs
