= Xihu, Jiangsu =

Xihu 西湖镇
- Town
- Location in Jiangsu
- Coordinates: 32°25′34″N 119°23′40″E
- Country: People's Republic of China
- Province: Jiangsu
- Prefecture-level city: Yangzhou
- District: Hanjiang District
- Time zone: UTC+8 (China Standard)

Xihu (Chinese: 西湖; pinyin: Xīhú) is a town in Hanjiang District, Yangzhou, Jiangsu, China. As of 2020, it administers the following four residential communities and seven villages.

- Xifeng Community (西峰社区)
- Cuigang Community (翠岗社区)
- Xihuhuayuan Community (西湖花园社区)
- Runyang Community (润扬社区)
- Jingwei Village (经圩村)
- Situ Village (司徒村)
- Jinhuai Village (金槐村)
- Zhongxin Village (中心村)
- Yuqiao Village (俞桥村)
- Shugang Village (蜀岗村)
- Huchang Village (胡场村)
