= Shuangqiao Subdistrict, Yangzhou =

Shuangqiao Subdistrict 双桥街道
- Subdistrict
- Location in Jiangsu
- Coordinates: 32°23′11″N 119°25′12″E
- Country: People's Republic of China
- Province: Jiangsu
- Prefecture-level city: Yangzhou
- District: Hanjiang District
- Time zone: UTC+8 (China Standard)

Shuangqiao Subdistrict (simplified Chinese: 双桥街道; traditional Chinese: 雙橋街道; pinyin: Shuāngqiáo Jiēdào) is a subdistrict in Hanjiang District, Yangzhou, Jiangsu, China. As of 2020, it administers the following eight residential communities:

- Shuangqiao Community
- Wutang Community (武塘社区)
- Shiqiao Community (石桥社区)
- Buqiao Community (卜桥社区)
- Wenyuan Community (文苑社区)
- Hongqiao Community (虹桥社区)
- Kangle Community (康乐社区)
- Wenyang Community (文扬社区)

== See also ==
- List of township-level divisions of Jiangsu
