= Touqiao, Jiangsu =

Touqiao 头桥镇
- Town
- Location in Jiangsu
- Coordinates: 32°19′40″N 119°38′52″E
- Country: People's Republic of China
- Province: Jiangsu
- Prefecture-level city: Yangzhou
- District: Guangling District
- Time zone: UTC+8 (China Standard)

Touqiao (simplified Chinese: 头桥; traditional Chinese: 頭橋; pinyin: tóuqiáo) is a town in Guangling District, Yangzhou, Jiangsu, China. As of 2020, it administers Touqiao Residential Neighborhood, Hongqiao Community (红桥社区), as well as the following 15 villages:

- Touqiao Village
- Jiusheng Village (九圣村)
- Xinqiao Village (新桥村)
- Xicheng Village (西城村)
- Antie Village (安帖村)
- Datong Village (大同村)
- Nanhua Village (南华村)
- Erqiao Village (二桥村)
- Anfu Village (安阜村)
- Hongping Village (红平村)
- Yingxin Village (迎新村)
- Qingfeng Village (庆丰村)
- Guoyu Village (国玉村)
- Fucheng Village (福成村)
- Xinhua Village (新华村)
