= Shizishan District =

Former district in Anhui Province, China

Coordinates: 30°56′09″N 117°50′45″E

Shizishan District (simplified Chinese: 狮子山区; traditional Chinese: 獅子山區; pinyin: Shīzishān Qū) is a former district under the administration of Tongling City, Anhui Province, People's Republic of China. It has a total area of 53 square kilometres (20 sq mi), and a population of approximately 70,000 people. The district's postal code is 244031. It was merged with Tongguanshan District to form Tongguan District in October 2015.

== Administrative divisions ==
Shizishan District administers four streets and one town. The streets include Shizishan Street, Xinmiao Street, Fenghuangshan Street, and Fanshan Street. The town is Dongjiao.
