= Xinsheng Subdistrict, Yangzhou =

Xinsheng Subdistrict 新盛街道
- Subdistrict
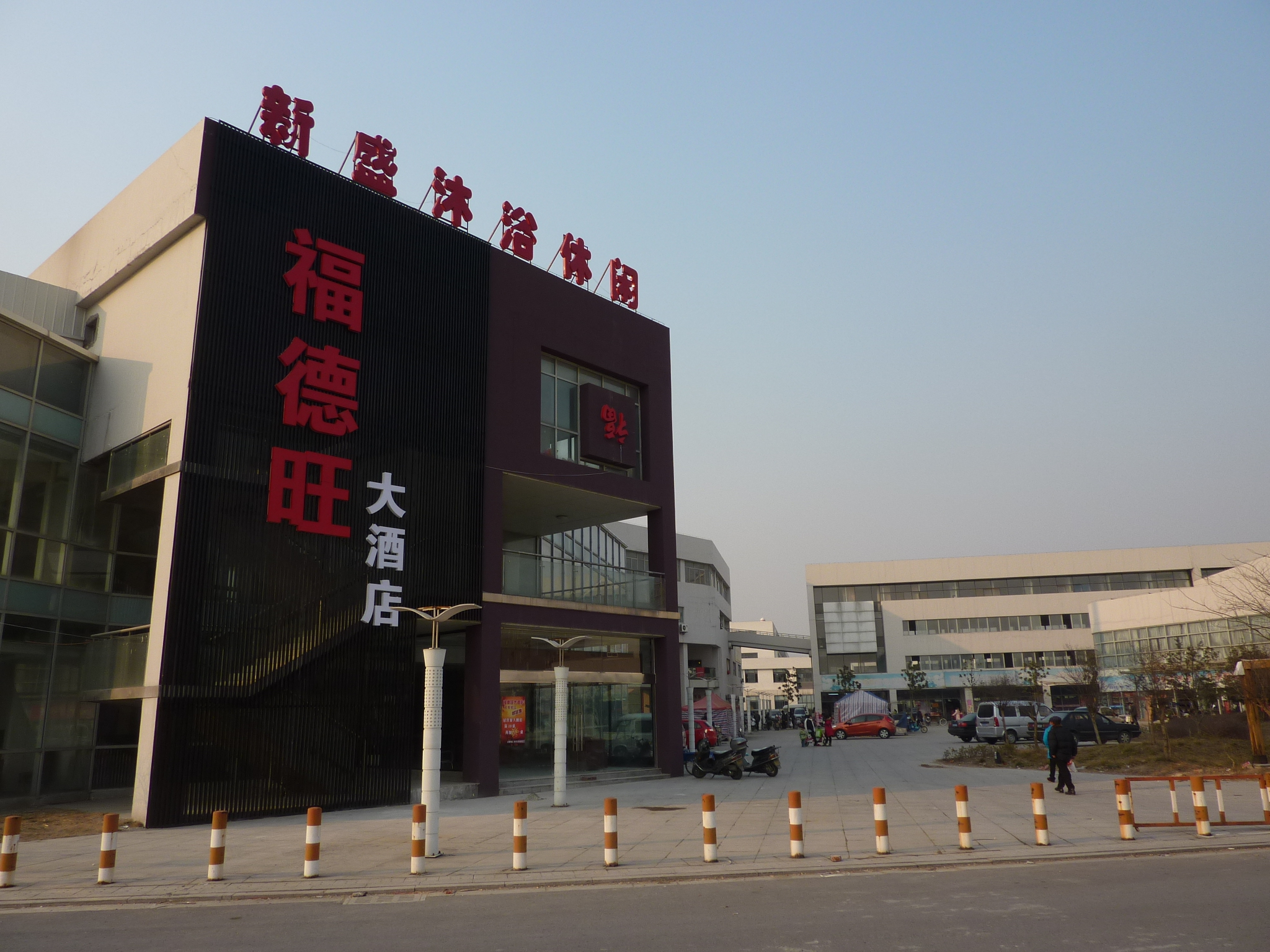
- Commercial center of Xinsheng Subdistrict

- Location in Jiangsu
- Coordinates: 32°22′49″N 119°21′55″E
- Country: People's Republic of China
- Province: Jiangsu
- Prefecture-level city: Yangzhou
- District: Hanjiang District
- Time zone: UTC+8 (China Standard)

Xinsheng Subdistrict (Chinese: 新盛街道; pinyin: Xīnshèng Jiēdào) is a subdistrict in Hanjiang District, Yangzhou, Jiangsu, China. As of 2020, it administers the following three residential neighborhoods and six villages:

- Lüyangxinyuan (绿扬新苑)
- Xinsheng Community
- Xinyue Community (新悦社区)
- Yinhu Village (殷湖村)
- Shuangdun Village (双墩村)
- Guoyuan Village (果园村)
- Daliu Village (大刘村)
- Yinxiang Village (殷巷村)
- Qilidian Village (七里甸村)

== See also ==
- List of township-level divisions of Jiangsu
