= Yangzhou University =

University in Yangzhou, China

- 扬州大学
- Type: Public
- Established: 1992
- President: Jiao Xin'an (焦新安)
- Undergraduates: 26,000 (2019)
- Location: Yangzhou, Jiangsu, China
- Campus: Urban
- Website: www.yzu.edu.cn

University rankings

Regional – Overall
- QS Asia: =271 (2025)

Yangzhou University (YZU; simplified Chinese: 扬州大学; traditional Chinese: 揚州大學; pinyin: Yángzhōu Dàxué) is a public university in Yangzhou, Jiangsu Province, China. It grew out of a merger in 1992 of six local colleges. The university offers undergraduate and graduate programs.

== History ==
Jiangsu Province Government proceeded to merge Jiangsu Agriculture College (江苏农学院), Yangzhou Teachers' College (扬州师范学院), Yangzhou Institute of Technology (扬州工学院), Yangzhou Medical College (扬州医学院), Jiangsu Water Conservancy College (江苏水利工程专科学校) and Jiangsu Commerce College (江苏商业专科学校) into a new university in 1988. It was implemented in 1992.

In September 2015, the People's Government of Jiangsu Province and the Ministry of Education of the People's Republic of China jointly issued the Opinions of the Ministry of Education of the People's Government of Jiangsu Province on the Co-construction of Yangzhou University, which became a provincial and ministerial co-construction university.

== Schools ==
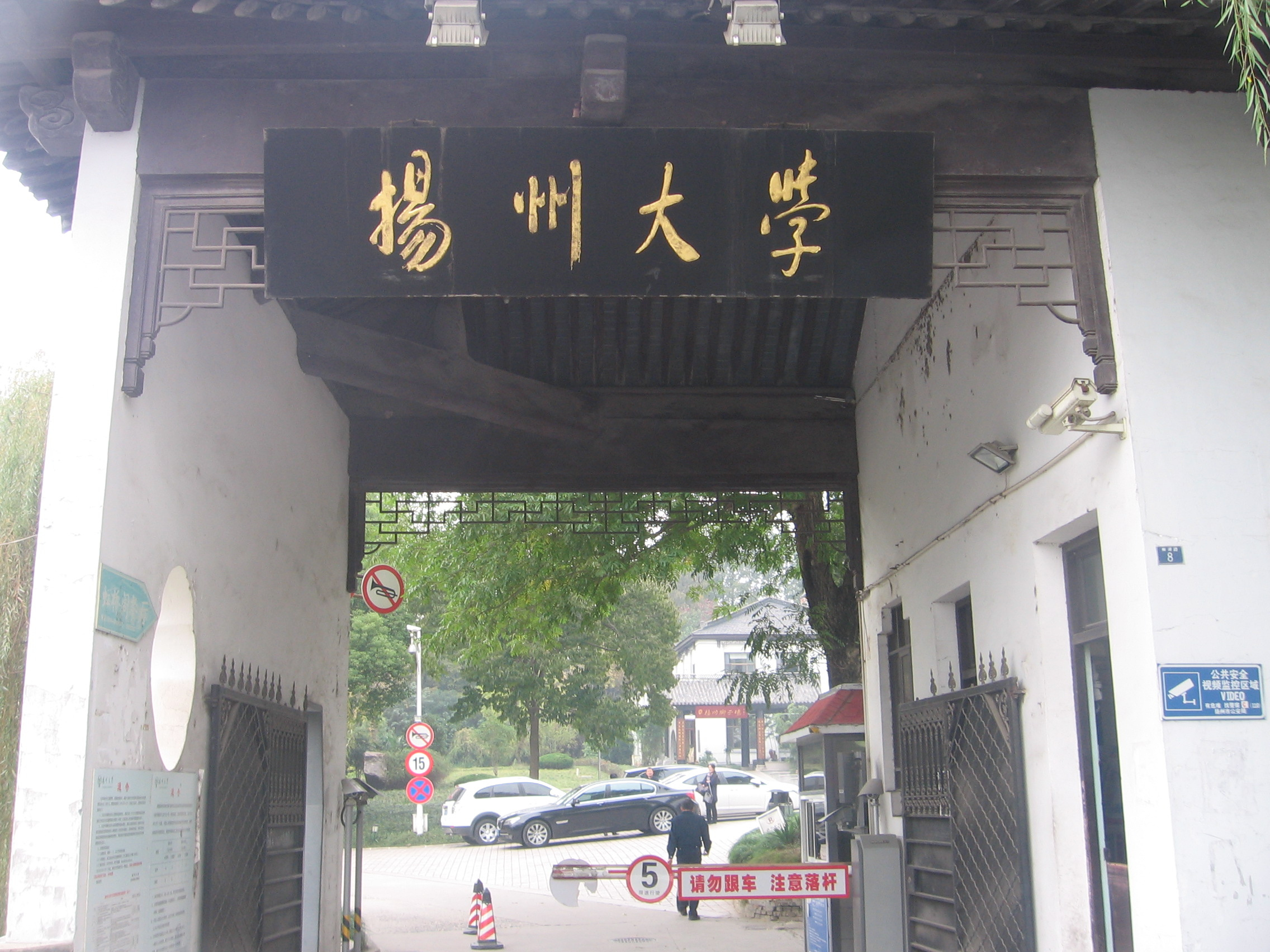
Yangzhou University

YZU offers its undergraduates 92 programs covering 11 disciplines, through its 26 schools:

- School of Chinese Language and Literature
- Social Development
- Law
- Educational Science and Technology (the Teachers’ College)
- Foreign Languages
- Mathematical Science
- Physical Science and Technology
- Chemistry and Chemical Engineering
- Physical Education
- Mechanical Engineering
- Information Engineering
- Architectural Science and Engineering
- Water Conservancy and Hydraulic Engineering
- Environmental Science and Engineering
- Agriculture
- Animal Science and Technology
- Veterinary Science
- Bio-science and Bio-technology
- Economics
- Journalism and Communication
- Management
- Medicine
- Nursing
- Arts
- Tourism and Cuisine (Food Science)
- Guangling College (university investment)
