= List of Major National Historical and Cultural Sites in Jiangsu =

This list is of Major Sites Protected for their Historical and Cultural Value at the National Level in the Province of Jiangsu, People's Republic of China.

Site	Chinese name	Location	Designation	Image
Palace of King Zhong of the Taiping Heavenly Kingdom	Taiping tianguo zhongwang fu 太平天国忠王府	Suzhou	1-3	Upload file
Sun Yat-sen Mausoleum	Zhongshan ling 中山陵	32°03′52″N 118°50′54″E Nanjing	1-19	Upload file
Yunyan Temple Pagoda	Suzhou Yunyan si ta 苏州云岩寺塔	Suzhou	1-68	Upload file
Humble Administrator's Garden	Zhuozheng yuan 拙政园	31°19′33″N 120°37′29″E Suzhou	1-121	Upload file
Lingering Garden	Liuyuan 留园	31°19′03″N 120°35′17″E Suzhou	1-124	Upload file
Suzhou Confucian Temple and its stone inscriptions	Suzhou Wenmiao ji shike 苏州文庙及石刻	Suzhou	1-131	Upload file
Arhat Statues of the Baosheng Temple	Baosheng si Luohan suxiang 保圣寺罗汉塑像	Suzhou	1-135	Upload file
Ming Xiaoling Mausoleum	Ming Xiaoling 明孝陵	32°03′37″N 118°50′04″E Nanjing	1-177	Upload file
Palace of the Heavenly King	Taiping tianguo tianwang fu yi zhi 太平天国天王府遗址	Nanjing	2-2	Upload file
Sanqing Hall of the Xuanmiao Temple	Xuanmiao guan Sanqing dian 玄妙观三清殿	31°18′52″N 120°37′19″E Suzhou	2-22	Upload file
Master of the Nets Garden	Wangshi yuan 网师园	31°18′01″N 120°37′48″E Suzhou	2-41	Upload file
Wall paintings of the Taiping Heavenly Kingdom on Tangzi Road	Tangzi jie Taiping tianguo bihua 堂子街太平天国壁画	Nanjing	3-3	Upload file
Former Residence of Zhou Enlai	Zhou Enlai guju 周恩来故居	Huai'an	3-14	Upload file
Yuhuatai Martyrs Cemetery	Yuhuatai lieshi lingyuan 雨花台烈士陵园	Nanjing	3-26	Upload file
Rock Sculptures of Kongwang Mountain	Kongwang Shan moya zaoxiang 孔望山摩崖造像	Lianyungang	3-42	Upload file
City Wall of Nanjing	Nanjing chengqiang 南京城墙	Nanjing	3-59	Upload file
Jichang Garden	Jichang yuan 寄畅园	31°34′55″N 120°15′58″E Wuxi	3-93	Upload file
Mountain Villa with Embracing Beauty	Huanxiu shanzhuang 环秀山庄	31°18′47″N 120°36′32″E Suzhou	3-94	Upload file
He Garden	He yuan 何园	32°23′08″N 119°26′55″E Yangzhou	3-97	Upload file
Ge Garden	Ge yuan 个园	Yangzhou	3-98	Upload file
Nantong Museum	Nantong bowuyuan 南通博物苑	32°00′48″N 120°51′53″E Nantong	3-99	Upload file
Sarira Pagoda of the Qixia Temple	Qixia si shelita 栖霞寺舍利塔	32°09′15″N 118°57′14″E Nanjing	3-143	Upload file
Ruiguang Pagoda	Ruiguang ta 瑞光塔	31°17′21″N 120°36′43″E Suzhou	3-147	Upload file
General Cliff Rock Paintings	Jiangjunya yanhua 将军崖岩画	Lianyungang	3-164	Upload file
Stone sculptures of Southern Dynasties mausoleums in Nanjing	Nanjing Nanchao lingmu shike 南京南朝陵墓石刻	Nanjing	3-167	Upload file
Stone sculptures of Southern Dynasties mausoleums in Danyang	Danyang Nanchao lingmu shike 丹阳南朝陵墓石刻	Danyang	3-168	Upload file
Jiaoshan Stele Forest	Jiaoshan beilin 焦山碑林	Zhenjiang	3-177	Upload file
Yancheng site	Yancheng yizhi 淹城遗址	Changzhou	3-203	Upload file
Two Mausoleums of the Southern Tang	Nan Tang er ling 南唐二陵	Nanjing	3-245	Upload file
Yangzhou City ruins	Yangzhou cheng yizhi 扬州城遗址	Yangzhou	4-52	Upload file
Dayishan Stone Coffin Tombs	Dayishan shiguanmu 大伊山石棺墓	Guanyun County	4-57	Upload file
Tombs of Han dynasty kings of Chu	Han Chu wang muqun 汉楚王墓群	Xuzhou	4-63	Upload file
Ming Ancestors Mausoleum	Ming zuling 明祖陵	33°04′56″N 118°28′40″E Xuyi County	4-73	Upload file
Twin Pagodas and Main Hall of the Arhat Temple	Luohan yuan shuangta ji Zhengdian yizhi 罗汉院双塔及正殿遗址	Suzhou	4-84	Upload file
Caiyi Hall	Caiyi tang 綵衣堂 (彩衣堂)	Changshu	4-137	Upload file
Yucheng Postal Stop	Yuchengyi 盂城驿	32°46′21″N 119°25′57″E Gaoyou	4-170	Upload file
Former Residence of Qu Qiubai	Qu Qiubai guju 瞿秋白故居	Changzhou	4-202	Upload file
Former British Consulate in Zhenjiang	Zhenjiang Yingguo lingshiguan jiuzhi 镇江英国领事馆旧址	Zhenjiang	4-216	Upload file
Purple Mountain Observatory	Guoli Zijin shan tianwentai jiuzhi 国立紫金山天文台旧址	32°04′00″N 118°49′00″E Nanjing	4-233	Upload file
Former Office of the Delegation of the Chinese Communist Party	Zhongguo Hongchandang daibiaotuan banshichu jiuzhi 中国共产党代表团办事处旧址	Nanjing	4-247	Upload file
Longqiuzhuang site	Longqiuzhuang yizhi 龙虬庄遗址	Gaoyou	5-38	Upload file
Tomb of Puhaddin	Pǔhādīng Mù 普哈丁墓	Yangzhou	5-159	Upload file
Tomb of the King of Boni	Boniguo wang mu 浡泥国王墓	31°58′54″N 118°45′38″E Nanjing	5-160	Upload file
Former Residence of Xu Xiake and Qinshantang Stone Carvings	Xu Xiake guju ji Qingshan tang shike 徐霞客故居及晴山堂石刻	Jiangyin	5-283	Upload file
Retreat & Reflection Garden	Tuisi yuan 退思园	31°09′36″N 120°42′58″E Wujiang	5-284	Upload file
Precious Belt Bridge	Baodai qiao 宝带桥	31°15′32″N 120°38′58″E Suzhou	5-285	Upload file
Couple's Retreat Garden	Ouyuan 耦园	31°19′06″N 120°38′04″E Suzhou	5-286	Upload file
Imperial Residence in Longwang Temple	Longwang miao xinggong 龙王庙行宫	Suqian	5-287	Upload file
Shuihui Garden	Shuihui yuan 水绘园	32°23′45″N 120°34′03″E Rugao	5-288	Upload file
Guoshan Stele	Guoshan bei 国山碑	31°18′03″N 119°39′11″E Yixing	5-446	Upload file
Thousand Buddha Cliffs and Stele	Qianfo ya shiku ji mingzheng jubei 千佛崖石窟及明征君碑	32°09′15″N 118°57′14″E Nanjing	5-447	Upload file
Architecture of the Former Residence of Xue Fucheng	Xue Fucheng guju jianzhuqun 薛福成故居建筑群	Wuxi	5-484	Upload file
Former Site of Examination Yuan of the Nationalist Government	Guomin zhengfu kaoshiyuan jiuzhi 国民政府考试院旧址	Nanjing	5-485	Upload file
Nanjing Man fossil site	Nanjingren huashi didian 南京人化石地点	Nanjing	6-69	Upload file
Tenghualuo site	Tenghualuo yizhi 藤花落遗址	Lianyungang	6-70	Upload file
Dadunzi Site	Dadunzi yizhi 大墩子遗址	Pizhou	6-71	Upload file
Huating Site	Huating yizhi 花厅遗址	Xinyi	6-72	Upload file
Sanxingcun Site	Sanxingcun yizhi 三星村遗址	Jintan	6-73	Upload file
Luotuodun Site	Luotuodun yizhi 骆驼墩遗址	Yixing	6-74	Upload file
Qingdun Site	Qingdun yizhi 青墩遗址	Hai'an County	6-75	Upload file
Chuodun Site	Chuodun yizhi 绰墩遗址	Kunshan	6-76	Upload file
Tianmushan Site	Tianmushan yizhi 天目山遗址	Jiangyan	6-77	Upload file
Yixing Kiln Site	Yixing yaozhi 宜兴窑址	Yixing	6-78	Upload file
Architecture of Zhongshan	Zhongshan jianzhu yizhi 钟山建筑遗址	Nanjing	6-79	Upload file
Ming Palace, Nanjing	Ming gugong yizhi 明故宫遗址	Nanjing	6-80	Upload file
Longjiang Shipyard ruins	Longjiang chuanchang yizhi 龙江船厂遗址	Nanjing	6-81	Upload file
Hongshan Tombs	Hongshan muqun 鸿山墓群	Wuxi	6-246	Upload file
Xuzhou Tombs	Xuzhou muqun 徐州墓群	Xuzhou	6-247	Upload file
Xiangshan Wang Family Cemetery	Xiangshan Wangshi jiazu mudi 象山王氏家族墓地	Nanjing	6-248	Upload file
Hongze Lake Dike	Hongzehu dadi 洪泽湖大堤	Huai'an	6-506	Upload file
Taibo Temple and Tomb	Taibo miao he mu 泰伯庙和墓	Wuxi	6-507	Upload file
Canglang Pavilion	Canglang ting 沧浪亭	Suzhou	6-508	Upload file
Huishanzhen Ancestral Temple	Huishan zhen citang 惠山镇祠堂	Wuxi	6-509	Upload file
Tianning Temple, Nantong	Nantong Tianning si 南通天宁寺	Nantong	6-510	Upload file
Pagoda at Chongjiao Xingfu Temple	Chongjiao Xingfu si ta 崇教兴福寺塔	Changshu	6-511	Upload file
Pagoda at Haiqing Temple	Haiqing si ta 海清寺塔	Lianyungang	6-512	Upload file
Arhat Sculptures at Zijin Temple	Zijin an luohan suxiang 紫金庵罗汉塑像	Suzhou	6-513	Upload file
Beisi Pagoda	Bao'en sita 报恩寺塔	Suzhou	6-514	Upload file
Stone Arched Bridges of Taicang	Taicang shigong qiao 太仓石拱桥	Taicang	6-515	Upload file
Pan Gate	Panmen 盘门	31°17′21″N 120°36′43″E Suzhou	6-516	Upload file
Lion Grove Garden	Shizilin 狮子林	31°19′24″N 120°37′30″E Suzhou	6-517	Upload file
Xuanyuan Temple Main Hall	Xuanyuan gong zhengdian 轩辕宫正殿	Suzhou	6-518	Upload file
Stone Hall of the Jilian Temple	Jijian si shidian 寂鉴寺石殿	Suzhou	6-519	Upload file
Pagoda at Zhaoguan Temple	Zhaoguan shi ta 昭关石塔	Zhenjiang	6-520	Upload file
Old Architecture of Hubushan	Hubushan gu jianzhuqun 户部山古建筑群	Xuzhou	6-521	Upload file
Zhan Garden	Zhan yuan 瞻园	32°01′21″N 118°46′47″E Nanjing	6-522	Upload file
Taizhou City God Temple	Taizhou Chenghuangmiao 泰州城隍庙	Taizhou	6-523	Upload file
Donglin Academy	Donglin shuyuan 东林书院	Wuxi	6-524	Upload file
Zhaosi Hall	Zhaosi tang 昭嗣堂	Wuxi	6-525	Upload file
Zhao Yongxian Residence	Zhao Yongxian zhai 赵用贤宅	Changshu	6-526	Upload file
Zhang Pu Residence	Zhang Pu zhaidi 张溥宅第	Taicang	6-527	Upload file
Dongshan Houses	Dongshan minju 东山民居	Suzhou	6-528	Upload file
Yipu Garden	Yipu 艺圃	Suzhou	6-529	Upload file
Shanxi Merchants Hall	Quanjin guiguan 全晋会馆	Suzhou	6-530	Upload file
Huai'an Prefecture Yamen	Huai'an fu ya 淮安府衙	Huai'an	6-531	Upload file
Shijantang	Shijian tang 师俭堂	Wujiang	6-532	Upload file
Lotus Bridge and White Dagoba	Liánhuāqiáo hé Báitǎ 莲花桥和白塔	Yangzhou	6-533	Upload file
Wu Family Residence	Wu shi zhaisi 吴氏宅第	Yangzhou	6-534	Upload file
Daming Temple	Yangzhou Daming si 扬州大明寺	32°25′18″N 119°24′30″E Yangzhou	6-535	Upload file
Xiaopangu	Xiaopangu 小盘谷	Yangzhou	6-536	Upload file
Gaoyou Pawnshop	Gaoyou dangpu 高邮当铺	Gaoyou	6-537	Upload file
Gan Xi Residence	Gan Xi zhaidi 甘熙宅第	Nanjing	6-538	Upload file
Courtyard and Stone Carvings of the Second Spring under Heaven	Tianxia di-er quan tingyuan ji shike 天下第二泉庭院及石刻	Wuxi	6-821	Upload file
Former Residence of Yu Yue	Yu Yue jiuju 俞樾旧居	Suzhou	6-928	Upload file
Former Residence of Abing	A Bing guju 阿炳故居	Wuxi	6-929	Upload file
Former Central Stadium, Nanjing	Zhongyang tiyuchang 中央体育场	Nanjing	6-930	Upload file
Great Hall of the People	Guomin dahui tang 国民大会堂	32°02′45″N 118°47′16″E Nanjing	6-931	Upload file
Central University site	Zhongyang daxue 中央大学	32°03′28″N 118°47′20″E Nanjing	6-932	Upload file
Jinling University site	Jinling daxue jiuzhi 金陵大学旧址	Nanjing	6-933	Upload file
Jinling Women's University site	Jinling nüzi daxue jiuzhi 金陵女子大学旧址	Nanjing	6-934	Upload file
Chunzailou	Chunzai lou 春在楼	Suzhou	6-935	Upload file
Rong Family Plum Garden	Rong shi meiyuan 荣氏梅园	Wuxi	6-936	Upload file
Former Residence of Zhang Tailei	Zhang Tailei jiuju 张太雷旧居	Changzhou	6-937	Upload file
Former Residence of Liu Yazi	Liu Yazi jiuju 柳亚子旧居	Wujiang	6-938	Upload file
Former Residence of Zhu Ziqing	Zhu Ziqing jiuju 朱自清旧居	Yangzhou	6-939	Upload file
Nanjing Massacre mass grave	Qin Hua Rijun Nanjing datusha sinan tongbao congzangdi 侵华日军南京大屠杀死难同胞丛葬地	Nanjing	6-940	Upload file
Headquarters of the Reformed New Fourth Army	Xinsijun chongjian junbu jiuzhi 新四军重建军部旧址	Yancheng	6-941	Upload file
Site of the Government of the Jiangsu-Anhui Border Region	Su Wan bianqu zhengfu jiuzhi 苏皖边区政府旧址	Huai'an	6-942	Upload file
Birthplace of the Chinese People's Navy	Renmin haijun danshengdi 人民海军诞生地	Taizhou	6-943	Upload file

== See also ==
- Principles for the Conservation of Heritage Sites in China
