= Erquan Yingyue =

Erhu piece by Hua Yanjun

二泉映月
- (Erquan Ying Yue)
- music by Hua Yanjun
- English: Erquan Ying Yue
- Other name: Two springs reflect the moon
- Key: G minor
- Year: 1950
- Time: 4:29

"Erquan Yingyue" (Chinese: 二泉映月) is an erhu piece composed by Hua Yanjun. The name Erquan comes from Huiquan in Huishan, Wuxi, known as the "Second Spring Under Heaven," where Abing often performed.

== History ==
While performing on the streets, A Bing often improvised untitled pieces, and locals called them 'Yixin Qu'. In 1950, when Professor Yang Yinliu from the Central Conservatory of Music recorded the piece, everyone discussed naming the piece "Moon Reflected in Two Springs." The name Erquan comes from Huiquan in Huishan, Wuxi, known as the "Second Spring Under Heaven," which is where A Bing often performs his work. Next to this spring is Jichang Garden, the Qin residence where A Bing's biological mother resided; On the other side is the Hua Filial Son Shrine, where Abing's original name was Hua Yanjun, and he belonged to a major Hua clan in Dongting, Wuxi.

During the Cultural Revolution, Moon Reflected in the Second Spring was criticized as a form of "feudalism, capitalism, and revisionism". It was only after the Cultural Revolution ended that "Moonlight Reflected in Erquan" began to spread widely Since 1978. Renowned conductor Seiji Ozawa has visited China multiple times, conducting the China Central Symphony Orchestra and the Boston Symphony Orchestra in the United States in performing "Moon Reflected in the Second Spring".
