= Rugao High School =

School in Jiangsu, China

Rugao Middle School is a school in Rugao city, Jiangsu province, China. It occupies 80,000 square meters and owns many buildings, such as laboratory buildings, library, gym, administration building and so on. With the development of the economy, more and more modern teaching equipment has appeared. Now in every classroom, there are a computer and projecting apparatuses.

Rugao Middle School was included in the list of key middle schools in 1946, when China was in the Cold War. Since then, it has been awarded as one of the key middle schools in Jiangsu province and a national demonstration of the average high school level.

It has cultivated students who later attended prestigious national universities, for instance Peking University, Tsinghua University, and Shanghai Jiaotong University.
