= Xihui Park =

Park in Jiangsu, China

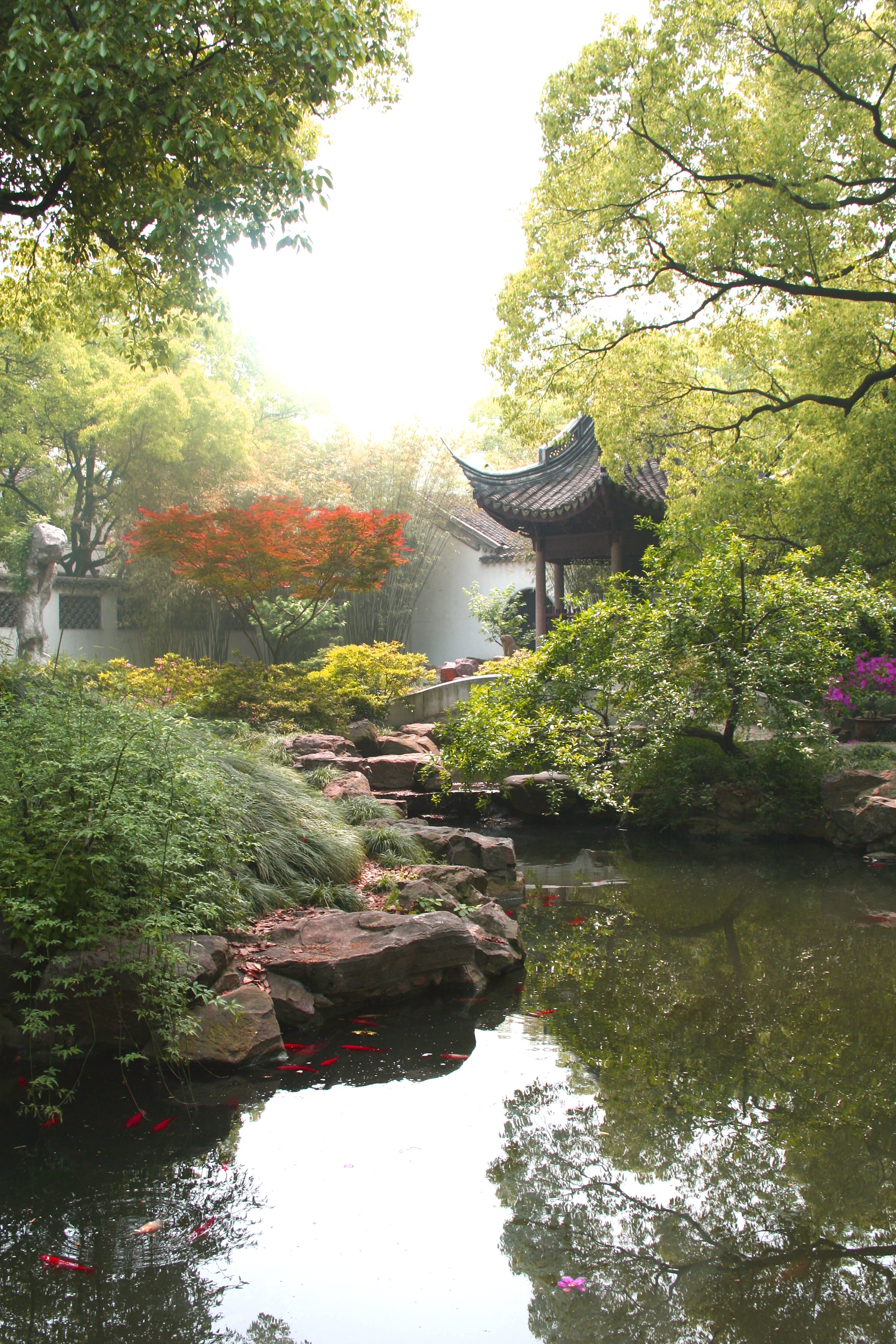
- Jichang Garden
- Traditional Chinese: 錫惠公園
- Simplified Chinese: 锡惠公园
- Literal meaning: Mt. Xi–Mt. Hui Public Park
Transcriptions
Standard Mandarin
- Hanyu Pinyin: Xīhuì Gōngyuán

Xihui Park is a key state park of China located west of Wuxi in eastern China's Jiangsu province. It was established in 1958 and commands historically famous views overlooking the city, the adjacent Grand Canal, and nearby Lake Tai. Its grounds include the Jichang Garden, the Second Spring under Heaven, the Dragon Light Pagoda, and a cable car connecting the park to the summit of Mount Hui.

Local legend purports that Xishan was once visited by the emperor Shi Huangdi.

== Name ==
The park is named for Mount Xi (t 錫山, s 锡山, Xīshān, lit. "Tin Hill") on its grounds and for nearby Mount Hui (lit. "Kindhearted Hill"), which is administered separately as the Huishan National Forest Park.

== Features ==
=== Garden ===
Jichang Garden is a famous traditional Chinese garden.

=== Spring ===
The Second Spring under Heaven was the inspiration for the blind erhu player Abing's most famous composition, the "Erquan Yingyue".

=== Pagoda ===
Dragon Light Pagoda (t 龍光塔, s 龙光塔, Lóngguāng Tǎ) is a seven-story brick-and-wood octagonal pagoda located at the crest of Xishan. It commands a traditional scenic view of nearby Lake Tai and the Grand Canal running through Wuxi, but a cable car between Xihui Park and the crest of Mount Hui (elev. 75 m or 246 ft) now offers a higher vantage point.

Constructed as a temple during the Ming dynasty, the original pagoda burnt during the Qing and was subsequently rebuilt. The pagoda's grounds were used as a "beggar's refuge" for the housing and training of Wuxi's indigent poor during the Republican period. As the city is named for the hill it stands on, the pagoda is sometimes used as a symbol of Wuxi.
