= Dragon Light Pagoda =

The Dragon Light Pagoda (Chinese: t 龍光塔, s 龙光塔, Longguang Ta) may refer to:

- Dragon Light Pagoda (Wuxi)
- Dragon Light Pagoda (Singapore)
