= History of the guqin =

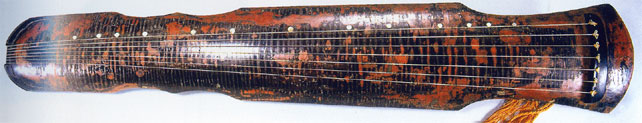
A famous Tang dynasty qin, "Jiu Xiao Huan Pei" 《九霄環佩》.

The history of the guqin, an ancient Chinese musical instrument, is a long one that spans 3,000 years. Although similar, it should not be confused with another Chinese zither instrument, the guzheng, which has bridges.

== Overview ==
=== Ancient origins ===
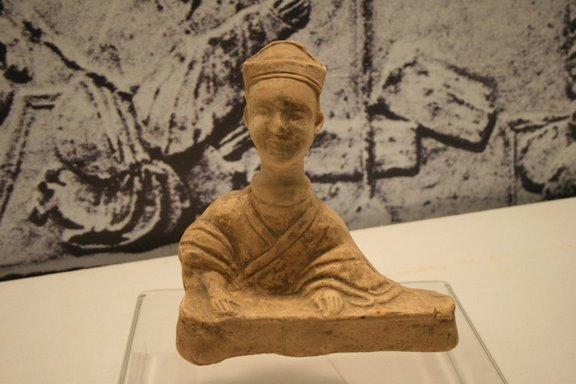
A ceramic figurine of a guqin player, from the Pengshan Tomb of Sichuan, dated Eastern Han dynasty (25–220 AD)

Legend has it that the qin, the most revered of all Chinese musical instruments, has a history of about 5,000 years. This legend states that the legendary figures of China's pre-history—Fuxi, Shennong and Yellow Emperor—were involved in its creation. Nearly almost all qin books and tablature collections published prior to the twentieth century state this as the actual origins of the qin, although this is now viewed as mythology. It is mentioned in Chinese writings dating back nearly 3,000 years, and examples have been found in tombs from about 2,500 years ago. Non-fretted zithers unearthed in tombs from the south show similar instruments that gradually became longer and had fewer strings, but they are not named in the tombs. Chinese tradition says the qin originally had five strings, but then two were added about 1,000 BCE, making seven. Some suggest that larger zithers with many strings gradually got smaller with fewer and fewer strings to reach seven. Whether the southern instruments can be called "qin," or simply its southern relatives, is questionable. The exact origins of the qin is still a very much continuing subject of debate over the past few decades.

The ancient form of the qin was shorter than that of today's and probably only played using open strings. This is because the surface of these early qins were not smooth like the modern qin, the strings were far away from the surface, had engravings on the surface (which would make sliding impossible) and did not mark the harmonic positions to be able to indicate to the player who would play them.

=== Development ===
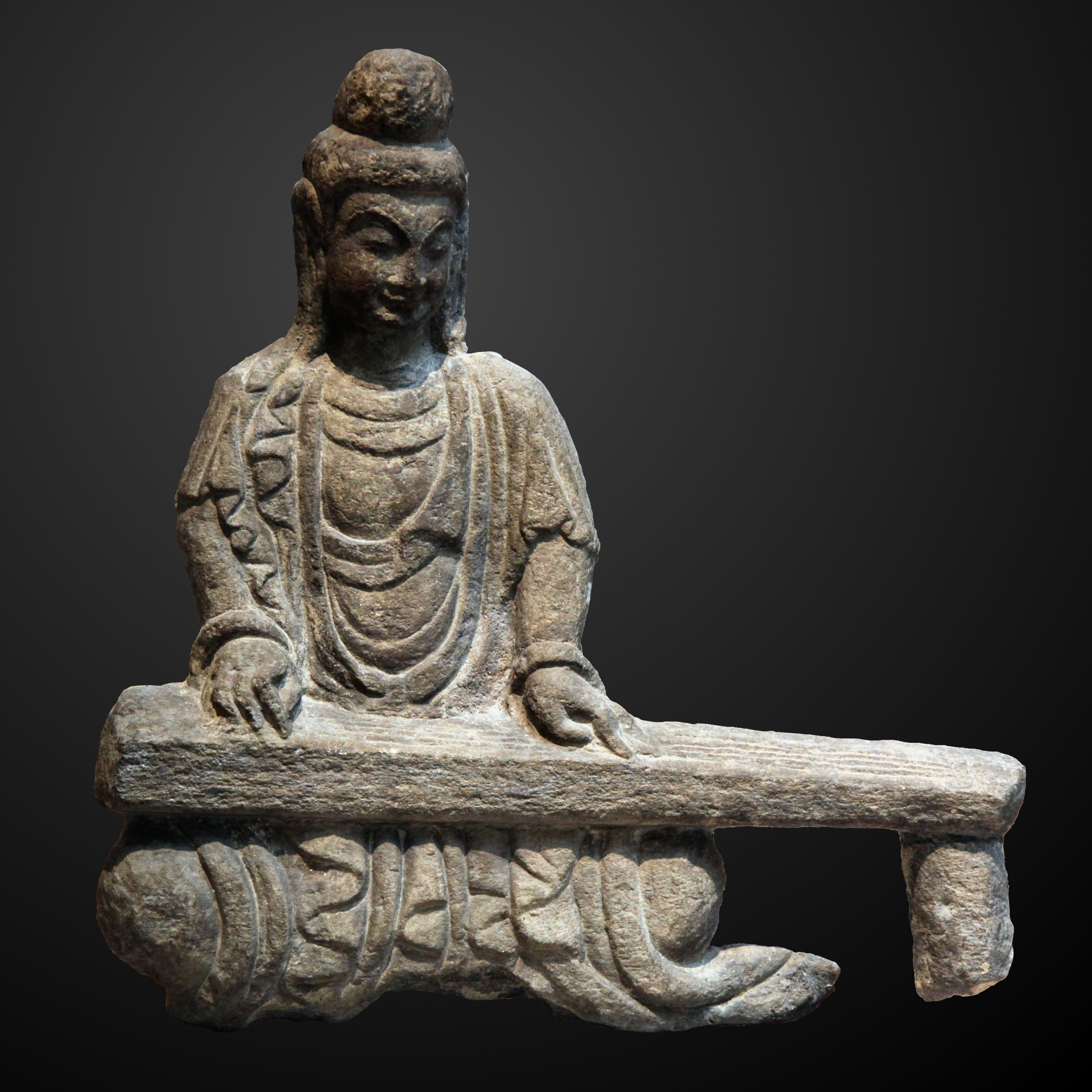
Rock carving of a bodhisattva playing a guqin, found in Shanxi, dated to the Northern Wei dynasty (386–534). Now displayed in the Guimet Museum, Paris.

The Chinese musicologist Yang Yinliu divided the history of guqin into three periods: the first is the pre-Qin period, the second from the Qin dynasty to Tang dynasty, the third from the end of Tang to the 20th century. It is believed that during the first period the qin became popular as part of the court orchestra and as an instrument of the elite.

In the second period, guqin music was influenced by Confucian ideology and Daoist philosophy, Central Asian music imported into the imperial court, as well as entertainment music of the Sui and Tang dynasty. During this period attempts were made to codify playing techniques and notation. Based on the detailed description in the essay "Qin Cao" 【琴操】 by Cai Yong (132–192), the standard form of the qin was most likely set around the late Han dynasty. The earliest surviving qin in this modern form, preserved in both China and Japan, have been reliably dated to the Tang dynasty. Many are still playable, the most famous perhaps being the one named "Jiuxiao Huanpei" 《九霄環佩/九霄环佩》, attributed to the famous late Tang dynasty qin maker Lei Wei (雷威). It is kept in the Palace Museum in Beijing. The earliest known piece of notated guqin music, Jieshi Diao Youlan, dates from this period.

In the third period, guqin compositions proliferated and the playing techniques were refined. The Song dynasty is considered the golden period of guqin music, with numerous poems and essays on guqin written by the literati, and many well-known pieces can be dated to this period. Treaties and handbooks were also written, documenting its music and playing techniques, and aesthetic consideration also became the most important aspect of guqin playing in this period. The Song dynasty was not only known for the proliferation of high-status literati qin players and audiences, but also for the emergence of a new kind of qin player called a “qin gentleman” (qinshi 琴士), who made a living by being patronized by literati who preferred to listen to qin performances and take qin lessons from men like themselves, as opposed to lower-status artists and entertainers.

=== Modern times ===
In 1977, a recording of "Liu Shui" 【流水】 (Flowing Water, as performed by Guan Pinghu, one of the best qin players of the 20th century) was chosen to be included in the Voyager Golden Record, a gold-plated LP recording containing music from around the world, which was sent into outer space by NASA on the Voyager 1 and Voyager 2 spacecraft. It is the longest excerpt included on the disc. In 2003, guqin music was proclaimed as one of the Masterpieces of the Oral and Intangible Heritage of Humanity by UNESCO.

== Mentions in Chinese literature ==
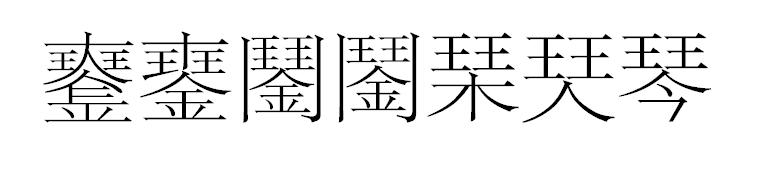
Ancient and modern variants of the character for the word qin, often found in old books

When consulting ancient and medieval Chinese texts, one will come across frequent references to the qin. Such references are particularly frequent in Classical Chinese poetry, such as the poetic verses of the ancient Shijing and certain poems of the Tang period.

=== Ancient poetry ===
In the Shijing 【詩經】 (Book of Songs), several poems mention the qin (with their numbers according to their order in the anthology):

- 「窈窕淑女， 琴瑟友之。」 "Fair and gentle is the maiden; Use qin and se to give her a friendly welcome..." [《關睢》 1]
- 「琴瑟在御， 莫不靜好。」 "The qin and se in your [the husband's] hands; Will emit their quiet pleasant tones..." [《女曰雞鳴》 82]
- 「我有嘉賓， 鼓瑟鼓琴。」 "I have fine guests; So I strum the se, strum the qin..." [《鹿鳴》 161]
- 「妻子好合， 如鼓琴瑟。」 "The love between mother and child; Is like the strumming of qin and se..." [《常棣》 164]

=== Tang poetry ===
In Tang Poetry, we have many mentions, including:

- 「主人有酒歡今夕， 請奏鳴琴廣陵客， 月照城頭烏半飛， 霜淒萬木風入衣， 銅鑪華燭燭增輝， 初彈淥稅後楚妃， 一聲已動物皆靜， 四座無言星欲稀， 清淮奉使千餘里， 敢告雲山從此始。」 "Our host brings wine, for merry-making tonight; And bids the guest from Guangling, to play upon the zither; Moonlight bathes the city walls, crows fly mid-air; Frost petrifies ten thousand trees, wind pierces our robes. But the copper stove gleams bright, and candles add their shimmer; First he plays Lu Water, then The Princess of Chu. As the first note trembles, all else falls silent; From the whole company not a word, till the stars begin to pale. The thousand miles to Qinghuai, I was sent by the Emperor's mandate; On such a night I venture to speak of, retiring to the mountains and the clouds." [A Zither Song : Li Qi, 《琴歌》 : 李頎]
- 「泠泠七弦上， 靜聽松風寒， 古調雖自愛， 今人多不彈。」 "Emotionless the mood of your 'seven-strings'; In the quiet, I sense the cool of the 'Wind through the pines'; I am one who loves the ancient tunes; There are few now who can play them." [Playing the Zither : Liu Zhangqing, 《彈琴》 : 劉長卿]
- 「蜀僧抱緑綺， 西下峨嵋峯， 爲我一揮手， 如聽萬壑松， 客心洗流水， 餘響入霜鐘， 不覺碧山暮， 秋雲暗幾重。」 "A monk from Shu, clasping a Luqi zither; Descends the west face of Emei peak. He sweeps his hand over the strings for me; And I seem to hear pines sigh in a thousand ravines; And a running stream, that washes the ache from my heart. The faint notes blend with the icy bells. I had not noticed the dusk on the green mountains: How many folds are hidden in the autumn clouds?" [On Hearing Jun, a Monk from Shu, Play the Zither : Li Bai, 《聽蜀僧濬彈琴》 : 李白]
- 「晚年惟好靜， 萬事不關心， 自顧無長策， 空知返舊林， 松風吹解帶， 山月照彈琴， 君問窮通理， 漁歌入浦深。」 "In my later years, I care only for quiet; The ten thousand affairs, no longer concern me. Communing with myself, I find no plan: I only know, I must return to the old woods. A pine wind, will loosen the girdle of my gown; A mountain moon, glitter on my zither. You question me about, success and failure? Listen — a fisherman's song drifting up the estuary!" [A Reply to Assistant Prefect Zhang : Wang Wei, 《酬張少府》 : 王維]
- 「獨坐幽篁裡， 彈琴復長嘯， 深林人不知， 明月來相照。」 "Sitting alone, in the hush of the bamboo; I thrum my zither, and whistle lingering notes. In the secrecy of the wood, no one can hear; Only the clear moon, comes to shine on me." [Hut Among the Bamboos : Wang Wei, 《竹里館》 : 王維]

The above poems are from 【唐詩三百首】 Tangshi Sanbai Shou (Three Hundred Tang Poems).

== Footnotes ==
1. Yin, Wei. Zhongguo Qinshi Yanyi 【中国琴史演义】. Pages 1–10.
2. United Nations Educational, Scientific and Cultural Organization (2004) The Art of Guqin Music (http://www.unesco.org/culture/intangible-heritage/masterpiece.php?id=65&lg=en, 29 July 2006)
3. Herdan, Innes (trans.). 300 Tang Poems 【英譯唐詩三百首】. Pages 128–129, 560-563 and 590–591.
