= Liu Zhangqing =

Chinese poet and politician

- 劉長卿
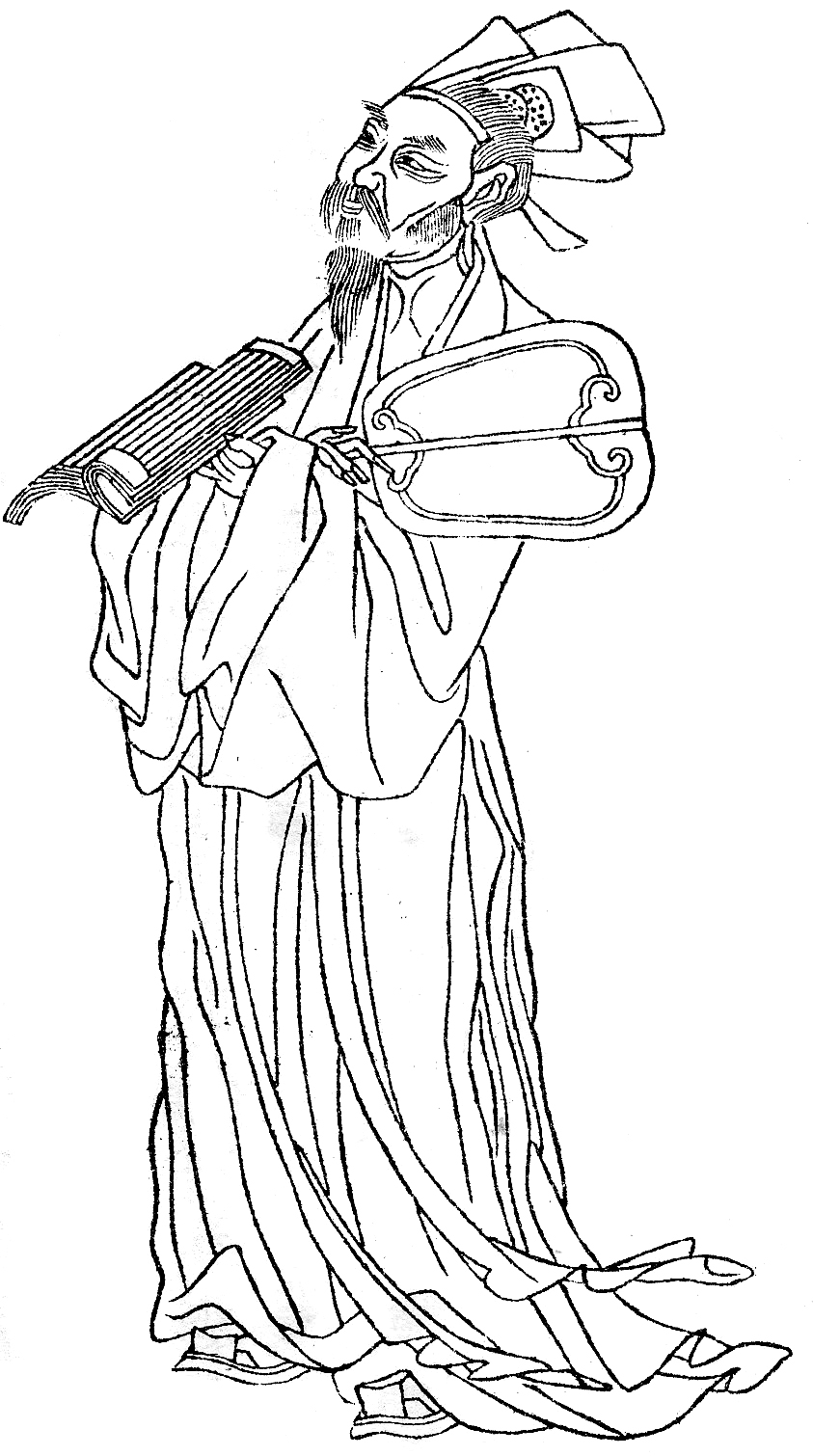
- Liu Zhangqing.
- Born: 709; Luoyang, Henan, China
- Died: 785 (aged 75–76); China
- Occupation(s): Poet, politician

Chinese name
- Traditional Chinese: 劉長卿
- Simplified Chinese: 刘长卿
Transcriptions
Standard Mandarin
- Hanyu Pinyin: Liú Zhǎngqīng
- Wade–Giles: Liu^{2} Chang^{4}-ch'ing^{1}

Wenfang
- Chinese: 文房
Transcriptions
Standard Mandarin
- Hanyu Pinyin: Wénfáng

Liu Zhangqing (Wade–Giles: Liu Chang-ch'ing; ca. 709–785), often read and Romanized as Liu Changqing, (Note: 長 can be pronounced both as cháng (long) and zhǎng (elder), while the former is more commonly used in Standard Chinese. In the context of Liu Zhangqing's name, the correct pronunciation should be zhǎng.) courtesy name Wenfang (文房), was a Chinese poet and politician during the Tang dynasty. Eleven of his poems are included in the popular anthology Three Hundred Tang Poems.

== Biography ==
Different sources place the year of Liu Zhangqing's birth as early as 709 and as late as 726. (Note: Ueki et al. (1999, p. 104) give "726?", Maruyama (1994) gives "725?", while World Encyclopedia gives "710?" and Britannica Kokusai Dai-Hyakkajiten gives 709. Daijirin does not give a date for his birth.) He came from the city of Xuancheng. Although his ancestral hometown was Hejian, he spent most of his youth in Luoyang, the eastern capital of the Tang dynasty. Liu obtained his Jinshi title around 750s. In 780, he was appointed governor of Suizhou in Henan province. Because of this, his contemporaries often referred to him as Liu Suizhou.

Like his birth, the year of his death is uncertain. One source says he died around 786. (Note: Ueki et al. (1999, p. 104) and Daijirin give "786?", Britannica Kokusai Dai-Hyakkajiten gives 785, World Encyclopedia gives "785?", while Maruyama (1994) gives "791?". Daijirin does not give a date for his death.)

== Poetry ==
During his lifetime, Liu's poems did not receive much praise, although he was one of the representative poets during the reign of Emperor Dezong. Later generations, however, have acknowledged his skill as a poet. Liu was especially skillful in writing of poems with 5 characters.

An example:

While Visiting on the South Stream the Taoist Priest Chang (尋南溪常山道人隱居)

一路經行處， Walking along a little path, ;
莓苔見履痕， I find a footprint on the moss.
白雲依靜渚， A while cloud low on the quiet lake
春草閉閒門。 Grasses that sweeten an idle door.
過雨看松色， A pine grown greener with the rain;
隨山到水源， A brook that comes from a mountain source –
溪花與禪意， And, mingling with Truth among the flowers,
相對亦忘言。 I have forgotten what to say.

== See also ==
- Guqin history (includes one poem with sound track)
- Huang Ruheng (a Ming Dynasty calligrapher of Liu)

== Works cited ==
- "Liu Zhangqing (Ryū Chōkei in Japanese)". Britannica Kokusai Dai-Hyakkajiten (in Japanese). Encyclopædia Britannica, Inc. 2014.
- "Liu Zhangqing (Ryū Chōkei in Japanese)". Daijirin (in Japanese). Sanseidō. 2006.
- Maruyama, Shigeru (1994). "Liu Zhangqing (Ryū Chōkei in Japanese)". Encyclopedia Nipponica (in Japanese). Shogakukan.
- Ueki, Hisayuki; Uno, Naoto; Matsubara, Akira (1999). "Shijin to Shi no Shōgai (Ryū Chõkei)". In Matsuura, Tomohisa (ed.). Kanshi no Jiten 漢詩の事典 (in Japanese). Vol. 1. Tokyo: Taishūkan Shoten. pp. 104–105. OCLC 41025662.
- Watson, Burton (1971). CHINESE LYRICISM: Shih Poetry from the Second to the Twelfth Century. New York: Columbia University Press. ISBN 0-231-03464-4
- "Liu Zhangqing (Ryū Chōkei in Japanese)". World Encyclopedia (in Japanese). Heibonsha. 1998.
