= Jiaoshan =

Hill in Zhenjiang, Jiangsu, China

Coordinates: 32°14′25″N 119°28′44″E

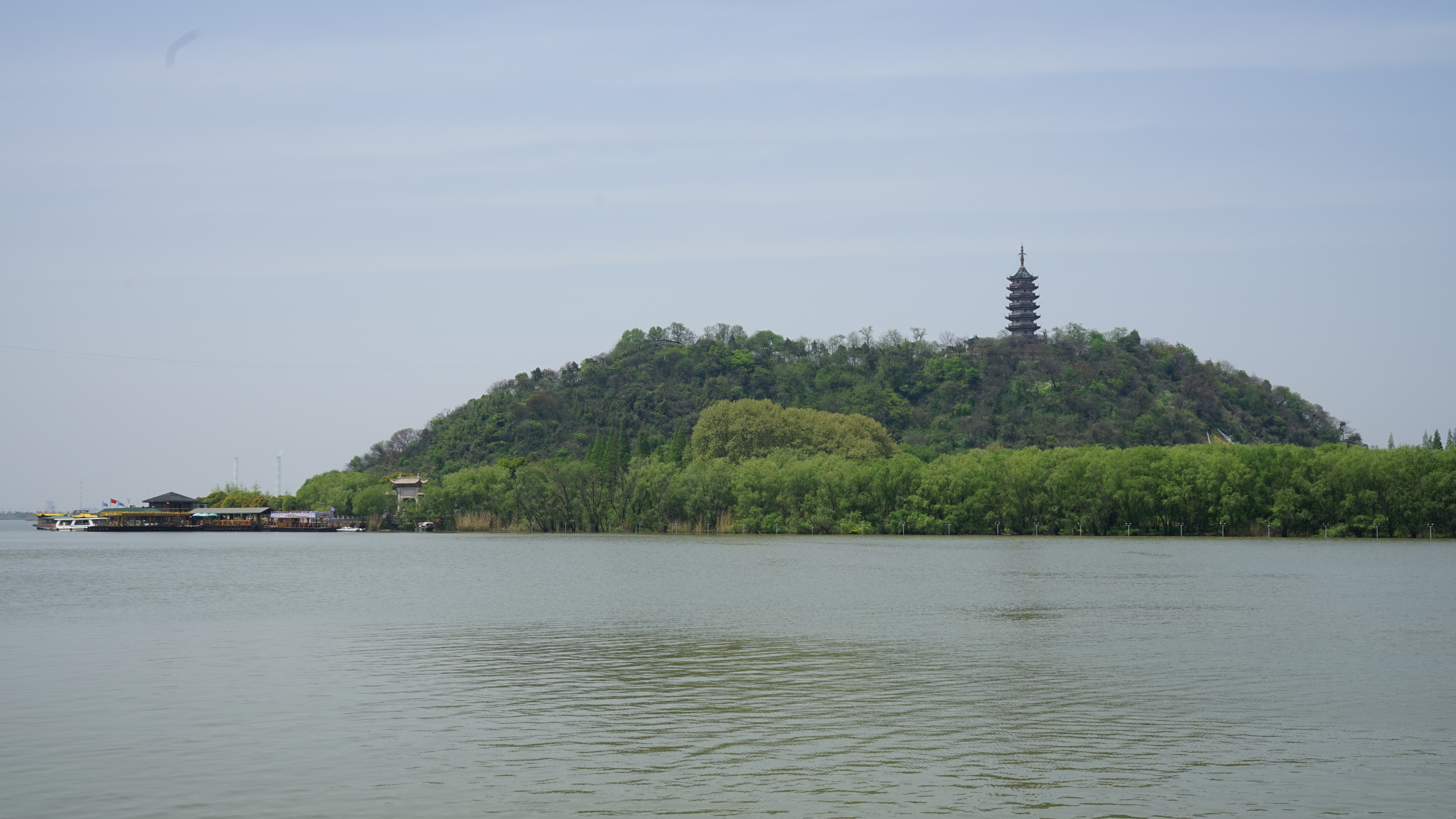

Jiaoshan (Chinese: 焦山, Jiāoshān) is a mountain in the city of Zhenjiang, in southwestern Jiangsu Province, People's Republic of China. It lies next to the Yangtze River.

It is a National AAAA-designated tourism area, located 71 meters (230 ft) above sea level.

== History ==
The area takes its name from Jiao Guang (焦光), who lived in the area in the 3rd century during the final years of the Han dynasty.

The Buddhist Dinghui Temple (定慧寺, also known as the Shanguo Temple, 山裹寺), is located in Jiaoshan.

=== Chinese steles ===
Jiaoshan is home to a large collection of more than four hundred ancient stone Chinese stele tablets — known as the Baomo Xuan (宝墨轩) and Jiaoshan Beilin (焦山碑林). One of the stele, the Yihe Ming (瘗鹤铭) was inscribed by the Han-era "Sage of Calligraphy" Wang Xizhi. These are a Major National Historical and Cultural Site in Jiangsu.
