= Baipu Middle school =

Jiangsu Baipu Middle School

Location
- Baipu town, Rugao, Jiangsu; China
- Coordinates: 32°14′6″N 120°45′45″E

Information
- Type: Comprehensive school
- Established: 1950
- Principal: Fan Jianyin (范建银)
- Staff: 230
- Teaching staff: 100
- Enrollment: 3600
- Campus size: 106,700 square metres (26.4 acres)
- Website: www.jsbpzx.net.cn

Jiangsu Baipu Middle School (Chinese: 江苏省白蒲中学) was established in the spring of 1950. It is located in Baipu town, in Rugao City, Jiangsu province, China, occupying about 106,700 square meters. There are fifty eight classes and three thousand and six hundred members in the school. Dining rooms, laboratories and gyms have been constructed.

Jiangsu Baipu Middle School is a comprehensive school consisting of junior and senior parts. In junior school, students are at an average of 16 years old while in senior one students are older than them, among 16 years old to 20 years old. They all have their own fixed classroom, one is on the left of Wenjin River and the other one is on the right.

There are 230 staffs in the school, and about 100 teachers have the title of senior and junior professional post. Every year there are over 150 published papers appearing in magazines.
