= Second Spring under Heaven =

Spring in China

Second Spring under Heaven 天下第二泉 Tiānxià Dìèr Quán
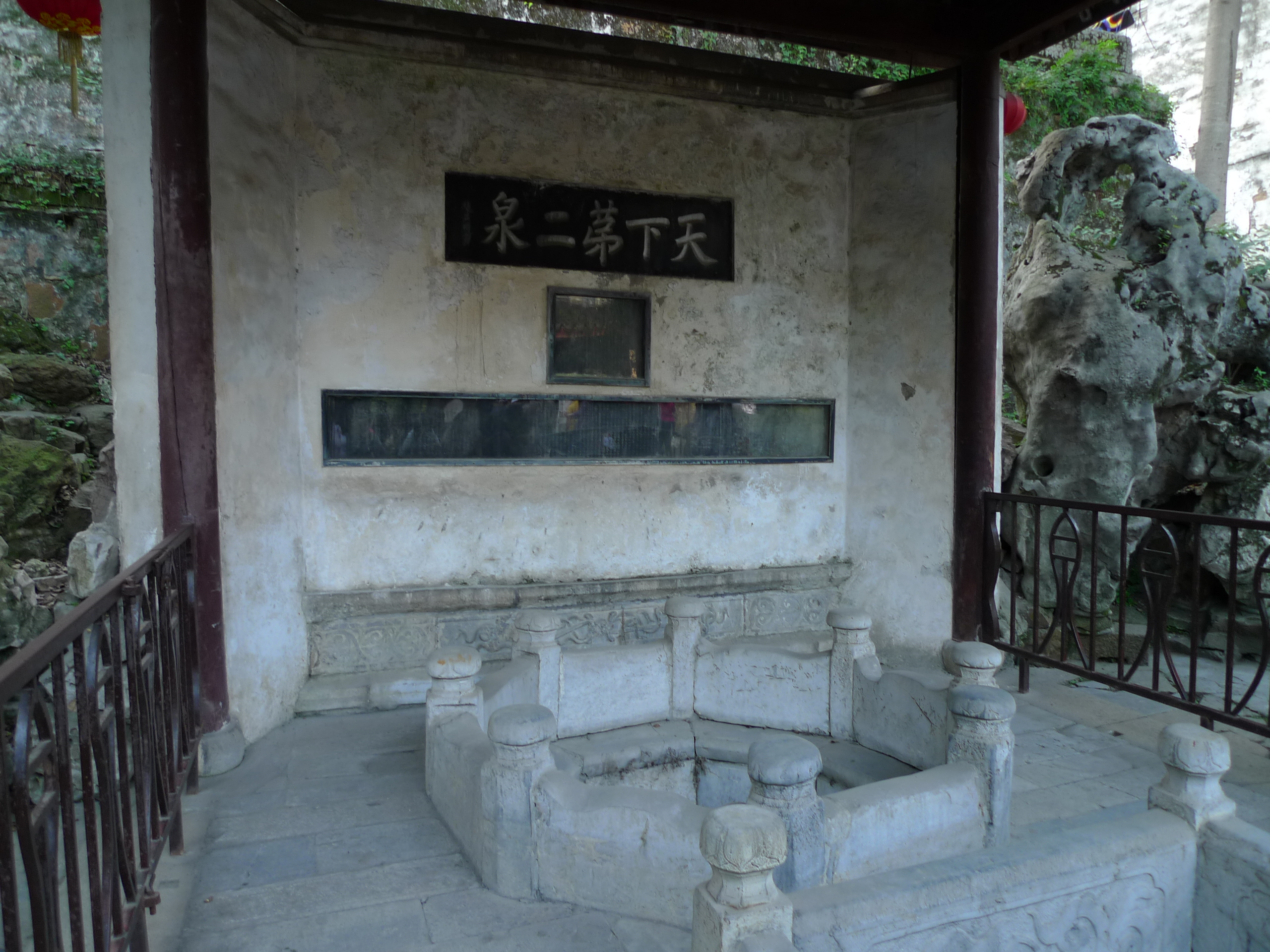
- The Second Spring
- Interactive map of Second Spring under Heaven 天下第二泉; Tiānxià Dìèr Quán
- Location: Xihui Park in Wuxi, Jiangsu, in China

The Second Spring or Second-best Spring under Heaven (Chinese: 天下第二泉, Tiānxià Dìèr Quán) is the name of a spring in Xihui Park at the foot of Mount Hui. The park is located in western Wuxi in eastern China's Jiangsu province.

== History ==
There are more than thirty springs located around Mount Hui. During the Tang dynasty, the mountain was considered holy. (Note: For instance, Dugu Ji, the district magistrate of Changzhou during the Tang, wrote: "At the foot of the holy mountain in Wuxi lie many springs.") Jing Cheng (styled Yuan Shen), a county magistrate for Wuxi, constructed improvements around its springs. The present-day Second Spring was one of those he improved, under the name Huishan Spring (惠山泉).

The present name derives from the Classic of Tea written by Lu Yu. In it, he divided all waters into 20 classes, ranking Huishan Spring's second in the world. The Song emperor Gaozong erected a pavilion over the spring after visiting to drink water from it. The placards proclaimed it the "Second Spring Pavilion" and "Source of Running Water". Su Shi, a famous Song-era poet, wrote several poems for the spring. Even after he moved to Hangzhou, he would write to his friend in Wuxi to send him water for tea. The present name featured on the pavilion was engraved by the celebrated Yuan-era calligrapher Zhao Mengfu.

== Architecture ==
The spring has three pools: an upper, middle, and lower. The upper pool is an octagon with water of the best quality. It has such a high surface tension that the water can brim several millimeters over a glass without spilling and the water is very clear and sweet. The middle square-shaped pool has the worst water quality. The lower rectangular pool is the largest and was excavated during the Song dynasty.

The pool wall features the head of a stone dragon carved by Yang Li in the 14th year of Hongzhi during the Ming Dynasty (AD 1501). The spring water runs out from the dragon's mouth into the pools. There are some Taihu rocks in front of the pools, forming a statue: the Avalokitesvara standing on the back of a bixi turtle. The Avalokitesvara statue has another of the dragon's daughter on the left and Shancai on the right side. At the bottom of the stone is an inscription of four characters by Hui Yan, which were originally part of the villa of Gu Kexue, the Director of the Board of Rites during the Ming dynasty. It was moved to its present location during the reign of the Qing dynasty's Qianlong Emperor. The large characters reading "Second Spring under Heaven" on the northern wall of the square pond are Wang Shu's.

== Legacy ==
Hua Yanjun, a famous folk musician also called Blind Abing, spread the fame of the Second Spring in his song The Moon Over a Fountain 二泉映月. Although the usual English translation does not clarify what "fountain" is meant, the more literal translation would be "The Moon Reflected in the Waters of the Second Spring."

== See also ==
- Tianxia
