= Zhu Meifang =

Chinese scientist

- 朱美芳
- Born: August 1965 (age 61); Rugao, Jiangsu, China
- Education: China Textile University
- Scientific career
- Fields: Materials Science
- Workplaces: Donghua University

Zhu Meifang (Chinese: 朱美芳; pinyin: Zhū Měifāng; born August 1965) is a Chinese materials scientist, former vice-president of Donghua University, and currently serving as its dean of School of Materials Science and Engineering.

== Career ==
After university, she taught there, where she was vice-president between September 2005 and December 2009. She works as dean of School of Materials Science and Engineering since September 2014.

== Honours and awards ==
- 2009 National Science Fund for Distinguished Young Scholars
- July 10, 2019, Academician of the Asia-Pacific Academy of Materials
- November 22, 2019 Member of the Chinese Academy of Sciences (CAS)
