= Stone sculptures of Southern Dynasty mausoleums =

Funerary in Jiangsu Province, China

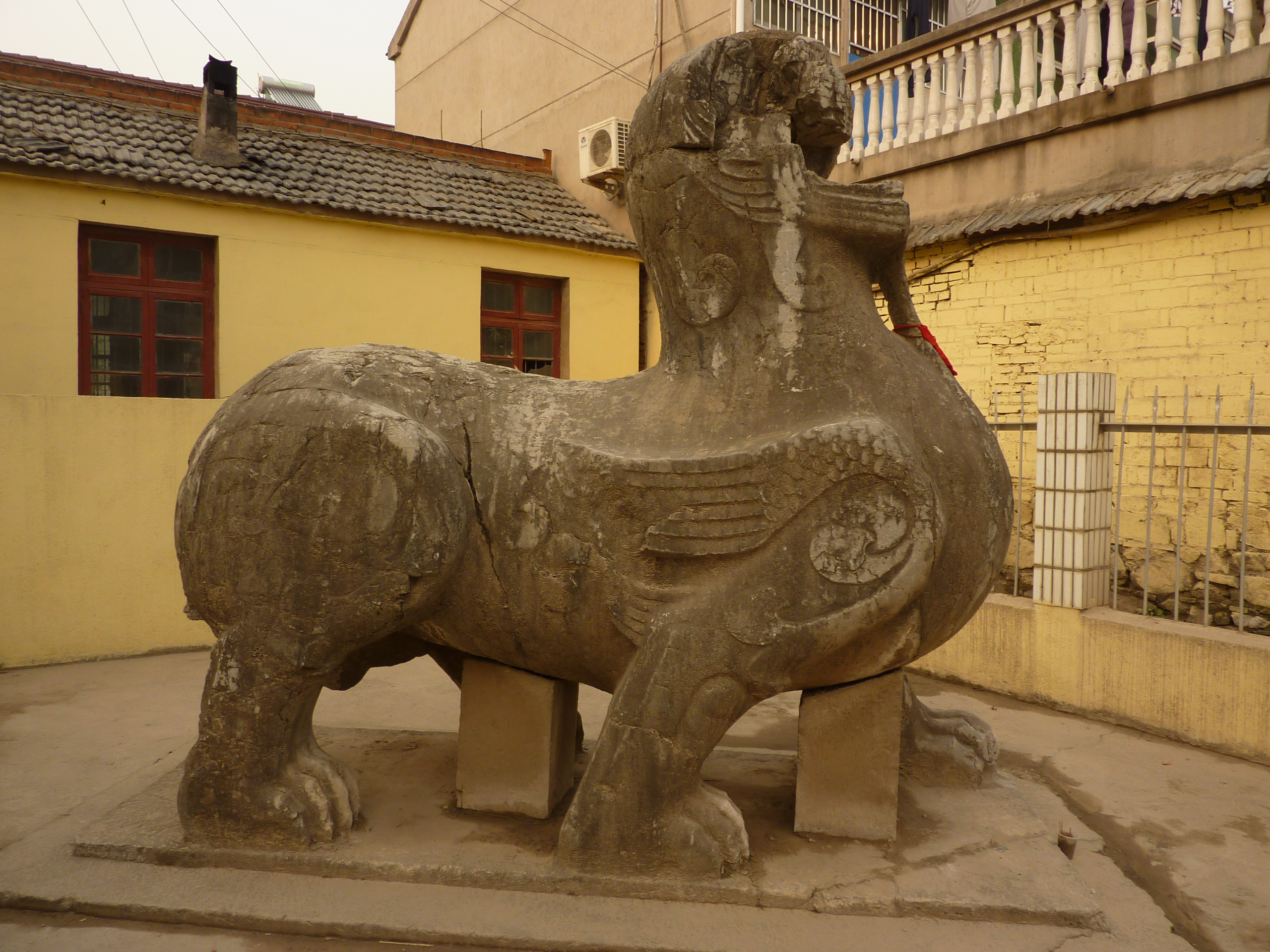
Qilin from the tomb of Emperor Wu of Liu Song, Qilin Town, Jiangning District.

The stone sculptures of Southern Dynasty mausoleums (Chinese: 南朝陵墓石刻; pinyin: Náncháo Língmù Shíkè) are several groups of stone sculptures in Jiangsu Province in eastern China.

The stone sculptures are located in four areas: Nanjing, Jiangning, Danyang, and Jurong. They are Major National Historical and Cultural Sites in Jiangsu. The mausoleums of the Six Dynasties period of the Southern Dynasties cover areas in Nanjing.

== Sculptures ==
These stone sculptures were first created in the Liu Song dynasty periods of the Southern Dynasties, about 1,500 years ago.

The vivid and elegant stone sculptures consist of: the Chinese unicorn (Qilin), Tianlu (a Chinese legendary animal), Bixie, stone columns, steles, and winged animals. They are the treasures of ancient stone art that reflect the cultural exchanges among China, Ancient Greece, and Ancient Persia.

A stone sculpture depicting Bixie is used as the city of Nanjing's icon.

== See also ==
- Major national historical and cultural sites (Jiangsu)
- Sculptures in China
