= Huishan National Forest Park =

Park in Wuxi, Jiangsu Province, China

Huishan National Forest Park in Wuxi, China

Huishan National Forest Park (Chinese: 惠山国家森林公园; pinyin: Huishan guojia senlin gongyuan) is a Chinese park in western Wuxi, Jiangsu Province, China. It is adjacent to Xihui Park.

It includes and is named for Mount Hui (惠山, Huìshān, lit. "Kindhearted Hill"). The Huishan National Forest Park lies three kilometers from Wuxi city. It was established in 1993 and covers an area of 93,333 hectares.

== Huishan Mountain ==
The park gets its name from the Huishan Mountain, which is a section of the larger Tianmushan Mountain. The park has numerous peaks, but the most prominent are the 328-meter-high Toumao Peak, Emao Peak, and Sanmao Peak. These peaks are collectively known as the Nine-Dragon Mountain. This area is endowed with many natural springs, and is specially renowned for its thirteen springs. The Huishan Mountain is widely regarded the first mountain in southern China.

== Reforestation ==
The Huishan National Forest Park area was one of the richest wildernesses in China in the 1950s. Back then, over five million trees stood in the area. But in the decades of China's feverish economic development and urban sprawl most of that wilderness was greatly exploited. Efforts to return the area to its former green glory were begun in 1982 by planting 370,000 trees. This massive reforestation project and subsequent developments have made the park one of the most-visited areas in southern China. It now boasts of four scenic zones: the Shimeng Scenic Zone; Emao-Peak Zone; Sanmao-Peak Zone; and Bieshang Plant Scenic Zone.

== See also ==
- Huishan Spring
