= Former British Consulate in Zhenjiang =

Historic building in Jiangsu Province, China

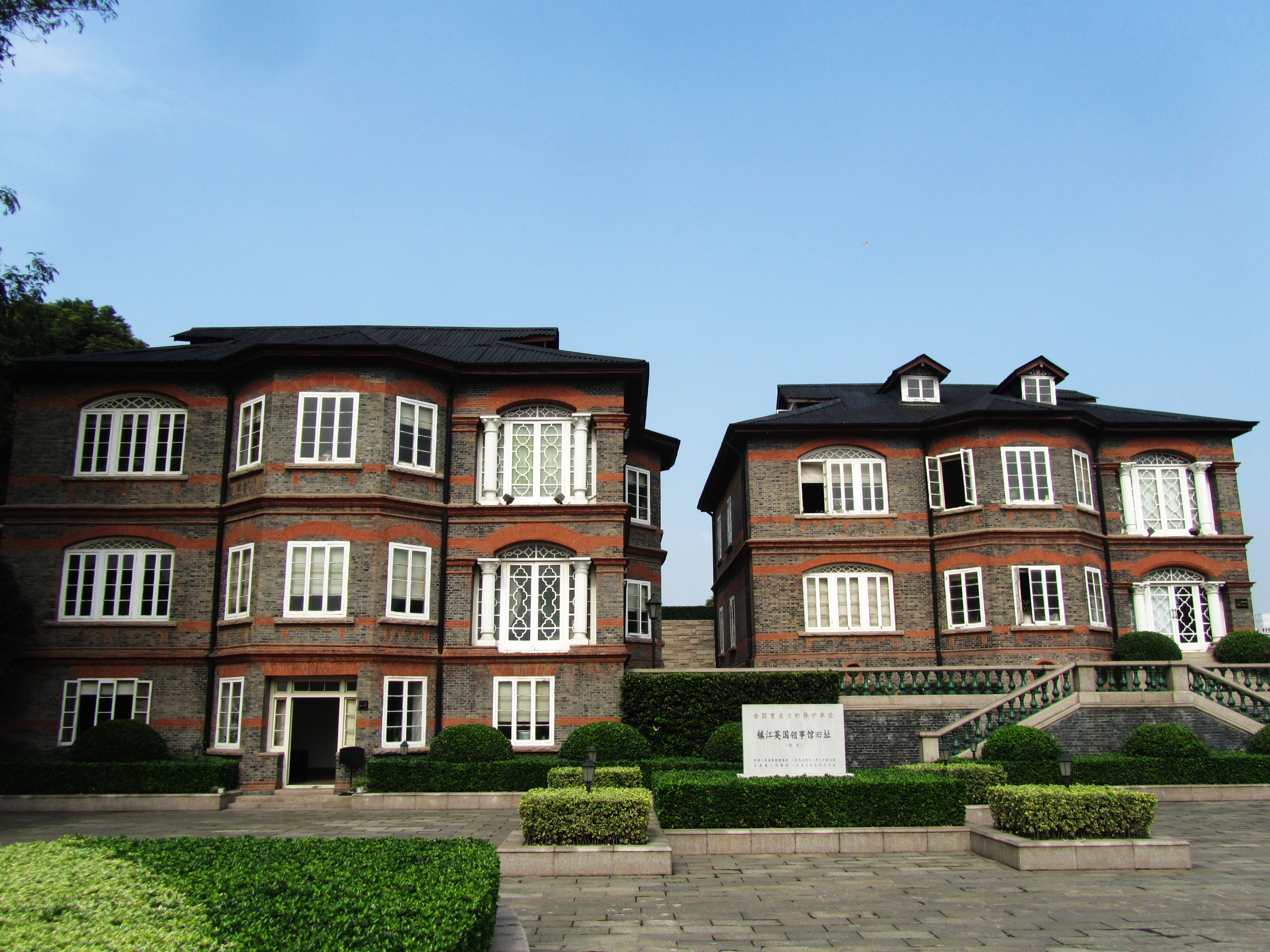
- Interactive map of the Former British Consulate in Zhenjiang area

General information
- Location: 53 Hillside, Xinjindu Old Street, Zhenjiang, Jiangsu Province, China
- Coordinates: 32.21567°N 119.42676°E
- Completed: 1864

The former British Consulate, is located at 53 Po Xijindu Ancient Street facing Daxi Road and Boxian Road, Zhenjiang, Jiangsu Province, China. In 1864, Britain constructed the consulate on Yuntai Mountain, which belonged to the British Concession in Zhenjiang at that time. In 1888, the British Consulate was burned down in local riots. From 1889 to 1890, it was rebuilt, occupying an area of 17 acres. Since the British Concession in Zhenjiang was officially returned to the Chinese government in 1929, Britain revoked the soldiers at the consulate in Zhenjiang, and turned it to the government. In 1958, the Zhenjiang Museum was established in the building.

== Architecture ==
As Zhenjiang was an important shipping and trade hub with a large number of emigrants in the late 19th century, the Former British Consulate in Zhenjiang is of high quality. Around the mountain are five well-arranged buildings, including an office building, chief consular residence, vice consular residence, staff quarters and clubs. To the north of the mountain and facing the Yangtze River is a triplex Municipal Council of the British Concession in Zhenjiang. The style of architecture is the gallery colonial style, which was quite popular among Britain's former colonies in India and Southeast Asia. In November 1996, the Former British Consulate in Zhenjiang was listed as a Major Site Protected for Its Historical and Cultural Value at the National Level by The State Council of the People's Republic of China.
