= Kongwang Mountain =

Mountain in Lianyungang, China

Coordinates: 34.5682°N 119.1683°E

Kongwang Mountain (Chinese: 孔望山), with a height of 129 meters, is located in the south of Haizhou district, Lianyungang city, Jiangsu Province, China. The name of Kongwang came from the story that the Confucius once climbed the mountain to watch the sea (although nowadays the sea is no longer visible from the mountain).

Kongwang Mountain is famous for the rock sculptures, which was sculpted in Han dynasty (late 2nd to early 3rd century).
