= Former Residence of the Weng Clan =

- 翁心存故居
- Interactive map of the Former Residence of the Weng Clan area

General information
- Location: No. 2, Weng Lane, Changshu, Jiangsu Province, China
- Coordinates: 31.64048°N 120.74165°E

The Former Residence of the Weng Clan (Chinese: 常熟翁氏故居; pinyin: Chángshú Wēngshì Gùjū, also called Former Residence of Weng Xincun) is located on the Weng Lane, Changshu, Jiangsu Province, China. It is a typical example of the gentry maisons in the regions south of the Yangtze River. The house was listed as a municipal cultural relics protection unit in 1982 with the name "the Former Residence of Wen Xincun". Its main hall, called "Caiyi Hall" (彩衣堂), was listed into the fourth group of National Key Cultural Relics Protection Units in 2001 and is now open to the public as the Memorial of Weng Tonghe.

== Original building ==
The residence dates from the Ming dynasty and originally belonged to the Sang Clan. It became Yan Cheng's property during the Longqing era (1567–1572) and underwent several changes of ownership afterwards. In the 13th year of the Daoguang era (1833) of the Qing dynasty, Weng Xincun (翁心存) bought the mansion from the Zhong family, and his son Weng Tonghe grew up here. It occupies a total area of 6,000 m^{2}, and the gross building area is about 3,000 m^{2}.

== Caiyi Hall ==
Caiyi Hall
- 彩衣堂
- Interactive map of the Caiyi Hall area

General information
- Location: No. 2, Weng Lane, Changshu, Jiangsu Province, China
- Coordinates: 31.64048°N 120.74165°E

Built in the late Ming dynasty and occupying an area of 235 m^{2}, the Caiyi Hall is the third hall along the central axis of the whole residence. Serving as the main hall, it was first called "Sengui" (森桂) and was renamed as "Conggui" (丛桂) " afterwards. When Weng Xincun rebuilt it, he changed its name to "Caiyi Hall". This name is taken from the story of Old Laizi and it carries the meaning that children should try to make their parents laugh by any means possible. The hall is 3 bays wide and features a "yingshan" (firm-mountain-sloped) roof (硬山顶) with nine rafters and "five purlins cross-beam". On either side of the hall stands a room and a roofed walkway connects it with other halls at its back. The traditional decorative colorings painted on the pillars are of high artistic value and they are considered masterpieces of the Suzhou style decorative paintings (苏式彩绘).
