= General Cliff Rock Paintings =

Petroglyphs in Jinping, Lianyungang

- Location in Jiangsu, China
- 34°32′10″N 119°07′47″E
- Type: Rock art
- Periods: Neolithic
- Location: Lianyungang, Jiangsu, China

History
- Built: c. 8000 BC

The General Cliff Rock Paintings or Jiangjunya Petroglyphs (simplified Chinese: 将军崖岩画; traditional Chinese: 將軍崖岩畫; pinyin: Jiāngjūn yá Yánhuà), also known as Jiangjunya Rock Paintings, are images carved into the rocks of the General Cliff (将军崖), located in Jinping, 14 kilometers far west from Lianyungang.

== Discovery and research ==
The site of the General Cliff Rock Paintings was discovered in 1979. In the 1980s, people found three petroglyphs of several square meters in the suburb of General Cliff in Lianyungang, Jiangsu, which were then hailed as "Oriental Book from Heaven" (东方天书) because of their obscure contents.

Many experts and scholars have confirmed that the rock paintings of the General Cliff are Neolithic works, which has become a consensus in Chinese historiography circle, but there are different speculations on the makers of these rock paintings, the time of production, the meanings of the images and the specific purposes.

One view is that the General Cliff Rock Paintings were made around 8000 BC, and are the oldest rock paintings ever discovered in China.

== Conservation ==
In 1988, the site of General Cliff Rock Paintings was included in the third batch of the list of Major Historical and Cultural Site Protected at the National Level by the State Council of the People's Republic of China.
