= Shuihui Garden =

Park in Rugao, China

Coordinates: 32°23′45.5″N 120°34′02.6″E

Shuihui Garden (Chinese: 水绘园; pinyin: Shuihui Yuan) is a park in the northeast of Rugao, Jiangsu, China, and was first built during the Ming dynasty by Mao Yiguan (冒一贯). It was finished in the Qing dynasty by Mao Pijiang (冒辟疆), who was Mao Yiguan's great-grandson. Shuihui Garden has been rebuilt and today is known as the former residence of Mao Pijiang and Dong Xiaowan (董小宛).

Shuihui Garden is famous for water flowing around the garden.

Shuihiu Garden lies in the north east of Rugao. The name, Shuihui Garden, means clear water.

== Attractions ==
Shuihui Garden was designed by using Mao design guidelines. For example, he took advantages of rivers to make the whole garden which was surrounded by water look like an ink picture.

- Several stone bridges
- Xiao San Wu Ting (小三吾亭)
- Bo Yan Yu (波烟玉), Han Bi Tang (寒碧堂)
- Huan Lei Feng (悬雷峰)
- Yi Mo Zhai (壹墨斋)
- Shui Ming Building (水明楼).
