= Rugao =

Rugao 如皋市
- County-level city
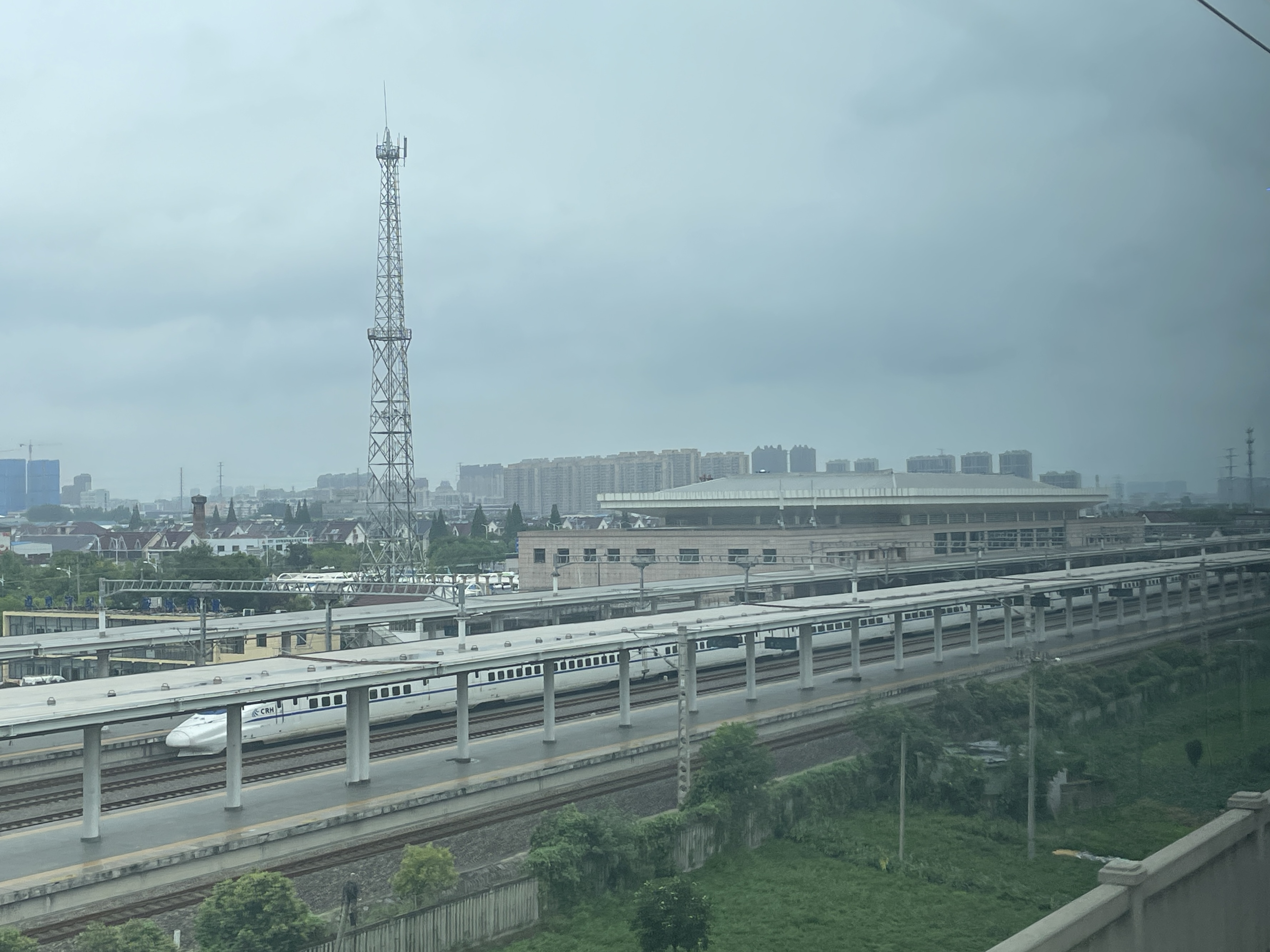

- Location in Jiangsu
- Coordinates: 32°14′46″N 120°35′28″E
- Country: People's Republic of China
- Province: Jiangsu
- Prefecture-level city: Nantong

Area
  - Total: 1,576.47 km^{2} (608.68 sq mi)

Population (2018)
  - Total: 1,241,700
  - Density: 787.65/km^{2} (2,040.0/sq mi)
- Time zone: UTC+8 (China Standard)
- Postal Code: 226500

Rugao
- Chinese: 如皋
Transcriptions
Standard Mandarin
- Hanyu Pinyin: Rúgāo
- Wade–Giles: Ju2-kao1

Rugao (Chinese: 如皋; pinyin: Rúgāo) is a county-level city under the administration of Nantong, Jiangsu, China, located in the Yangtze River Delta on the northern (left) bank of the river.

== History ==
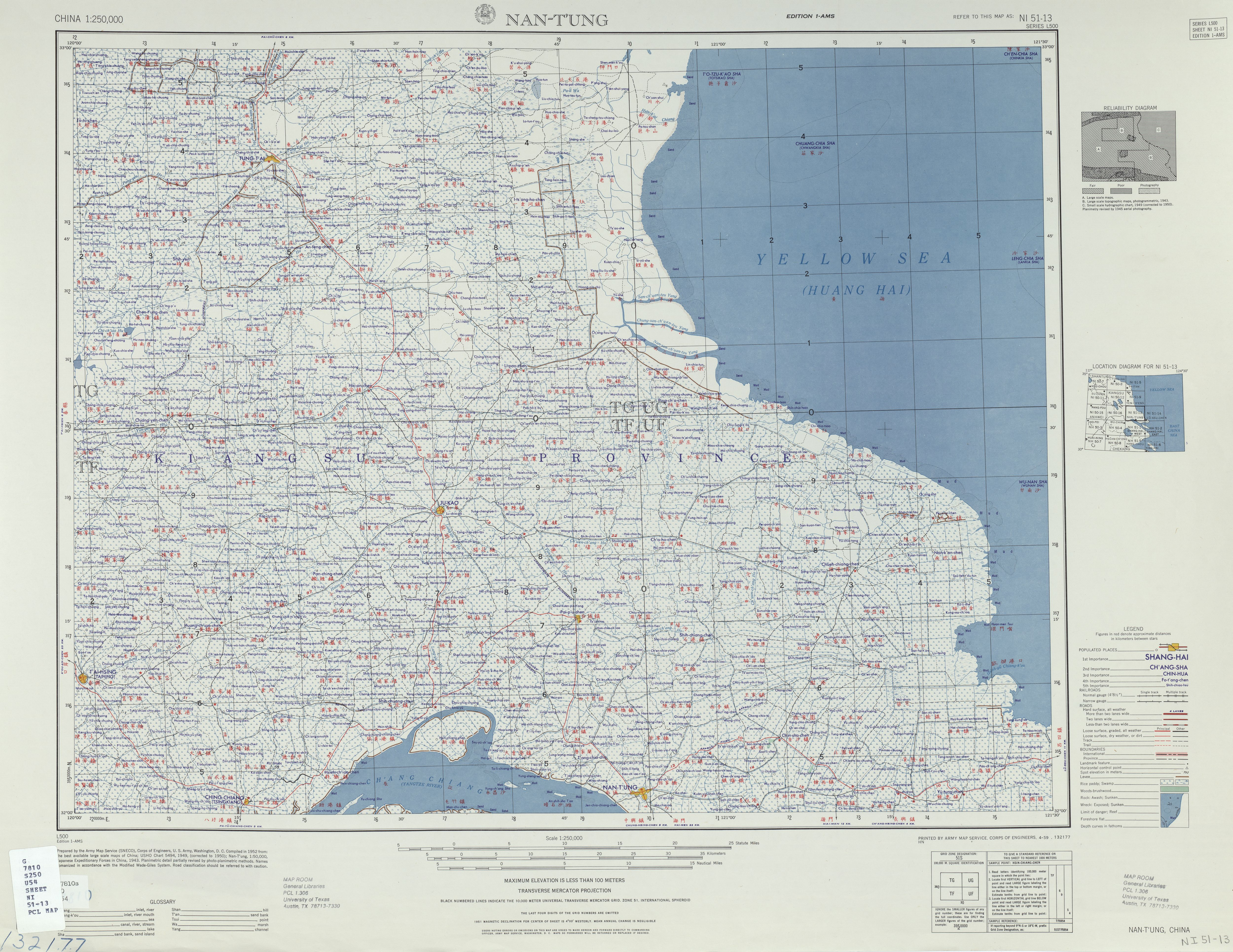
Map including Rugao (labeled as JU-KAO 如皋) (AMS, 1952)

In 411, the western part of then Hailing (Taizhou) was separated from the county to create Rugao county, which named after a coastal village. During the Sui dynasty, the county was merged into Ninghai county. Restored in 952, the county was transferred to then Tongzhou in 1724. Around the 1930s, Rugao was the most populous county in then Jiangsu province. Two county governments of the New Fourth Army were established in the then county: Ruxi (literally Western Rugao) and Rugao (1940–5, was renamed as Rudong by the CPC in November 1945), while the Tongzhou-Yangzhou Canal marked the boundary between the two regions, during the Second Sino-Japanese War. Ruxi succeed to the designation Rugao in 1945, the reshuffling of territory came true only in January 1949, when the CPC totally controlled the area. On 1 June 1990, with approval of the State Council, Rugao was turned into a county-level city, which went into effect in 1991.

== Administrative divisions ==
At present, Rugao City has one subdistrict and 19 towns.

1 subdistrict

- Rucheng (如城镇)

19 towns

- Chaiwan (柴湾镇)
- Xue'an (雪岸镇)
- Dongchen (东陈镇)
- Dingyan (丁堰镇)
- Baipu (白蒲镇)
- Linzi (林梓镇)
- Xiayuan (下原镇)
- Jiuhua (九华镇)
- Guoyuan (郭园镇)
- Shizhuang (石庄镇)
- Changjiang (长江镇)
- Wuyao (吴窑镇)
- Jiang'an (江安镇)
- Gaoming (高明镇)
- Changqing (常青镇)
- Banjing (搬经镇)
- Motou (磨头镇)
- Taoyuan (桃园镇)
- Yuanqiao (袁桥镇)

== Climate ==
Climate data for Rugao, elevation 8 m (26 ft), (1991–2020 normals, extremes 1958–present)
Month	Jan	Feb	Mar	Apr	May	Jun	Jul	Aug	Sep	Oct	Nov	Dec	Year
Record high °C (°F)	20.1 (68.2)	25.6 (78.1)	32.2 (90.0)	33.0 (91.4)	36.7 (98.1)	37.0 (98.6)	39.5 (103.1)	38.9 (102.0)	36.8 (98.2)	36.4 (97.5)	29.1 (84.4)	23.8 (74.8)	39.5 (103.1)
Mean daily maximum °C (°F)	7.1 (44.8)	9.4 (48.9)	14.0 (57.2)	20.1 (68.2)	25.4 (77.7)	28.4 (83.1)	31.6 (88.9)	31.1 (88.0)	27.3 (81.1)	22.5 (72.5)	16.5 (61.7)	9.8 (49.6)	20.3 (68.5)
Daily mean °C (°F)	2.7 (36.9)	4.6 (40.3)	8.7 (47.7)	14.4 (57.9)	19.8 (67.6)	23.7 (74.7)	27.5 (81.5)	27.0 (80.6)	23.0 (73.4)	17.4 (63.3)	11.3 (52.3)	5.0 (41.0)	15.4 (59.8)
Mean daily minimum °C (°F)	−0.6 (30.9)	0.9 (33.6)	4.5 (40.1)	9.4 (48.9)	14.9 (58.8)	20.0 (68.0)	24.2 (75.6)	24.0 (75.2)	19.5 (67.1)	13.2 (55.8)	7.1 (44.8)	1.3 (34.3)	11.5 (52.8)
Record low °C (°F)	−11.2 (11.8)	−12.1 (10.2)	−8.3 (17.1)	−2.2 (28.0)	3.5 (38.3)	10.0 (50.0)	15.0 (59.0)	16.1 (61.0)	8.9 (48.0)	−0.3 (31.5)	−5.4 (22.3)	−13.4 (7.9)	−13.4 (7.9)
Average precipitation mm (inches)	50.9 (2.00)	49.0 (1.93)	74.5 (2.93)	64.6 (2.54)	92.1 (3.63)	156.0 (6.14)	206.4 (8.13)	177.0 (6.97)	91.7 (3.61)	54.5 (2.15)	56.9 (2.24)	36.7 (1.44)	1,110.3 (43.71)
Average precipitation days (≥ 0.1 mm)	9.2	9.0	10.2	9.2	10.4	11.6	13.1	13.2	8.9	7.2	8.1	7.1	117.2
Average snowy days	2.9	2.6	0.7	0	0	0	0	0	0	0	0.2	0.7	7.1
Average relative humidity (%)	76	76	75	75	76	80	83	84	81	78	77	74	78
Mean monthly sunshine hours	125.3	127.4	155.3	178.3	182.2	135.5	170.1	186.6	167.3	169.3	140.3	142.2	1,879.8
Percentage possible sunshine	39	41	42	46	43	32	39	46	46	49	45	46	43
Source: China Meteorological Administration all-time extreme temperature

== Economy ==
In 2017, Rugao formed a joint venture with Steve Saleen and his business partner Charlie Wang (Xiaolin Wang, in Chinese), creating a company named "Jiangsu Saleen Automotive Technology" (Chinese: 赛麟汽车) in Rugao, with Charlie Wang as Chairman, CEO, and majority owner of the company. Charlie Wang had been CEO of GreenTech Automotive, before it went bankrupt. Only Nantong Jiahe, a state-owned shareholder, invested in the joint venture–it invested CNY3.4 billion (US$481.3 million) and owned 34% of the company; the other four shareholders of the company were shell companies controlled by Wang. The company was to produce and distribute vehicles in China for the Chinese market. CEO Wang said he wanted to turn the company into a brand rivaling Porsche.

The company's only mass-produced model that it sold was the low-end pure electric microcar called the "MaiMai", with a maximum speed of 100 km/h, which was introduced in 2019. However, only 31 had been sold as of May 2022. It had been built at a cost of CNY 5 billion (US$751 million). In February 2020, the company's Rugao factory was closed.

The Chinese government said that Charlie Wang embezzled nearly $1 billion in state funds. Wang then absconded to the United States. The Nantong Intermediate People's Court put the company up for auction on May 30, 2022, including the company's uncompleted production facility in Rugao that was supposed to be completed in 2019 and be able to produce 150,000 cars per year.

== Education ==
- Baipu Middle school (1950)

== Tourism ==
- Shuihui Garden
- Lingwei Taoist Temple
- Red Army Memorial Museum

== Notable people ==
- Li Yu, playwright, novelist and publisher
- Henry Lee, criminologist
- Huang Beijia, writer
- Xiaowei Zhuang, biophysicist
- Zhu Meifang, materials scientist
