= Abing =

Chinese Taoist musician (1893–1950)

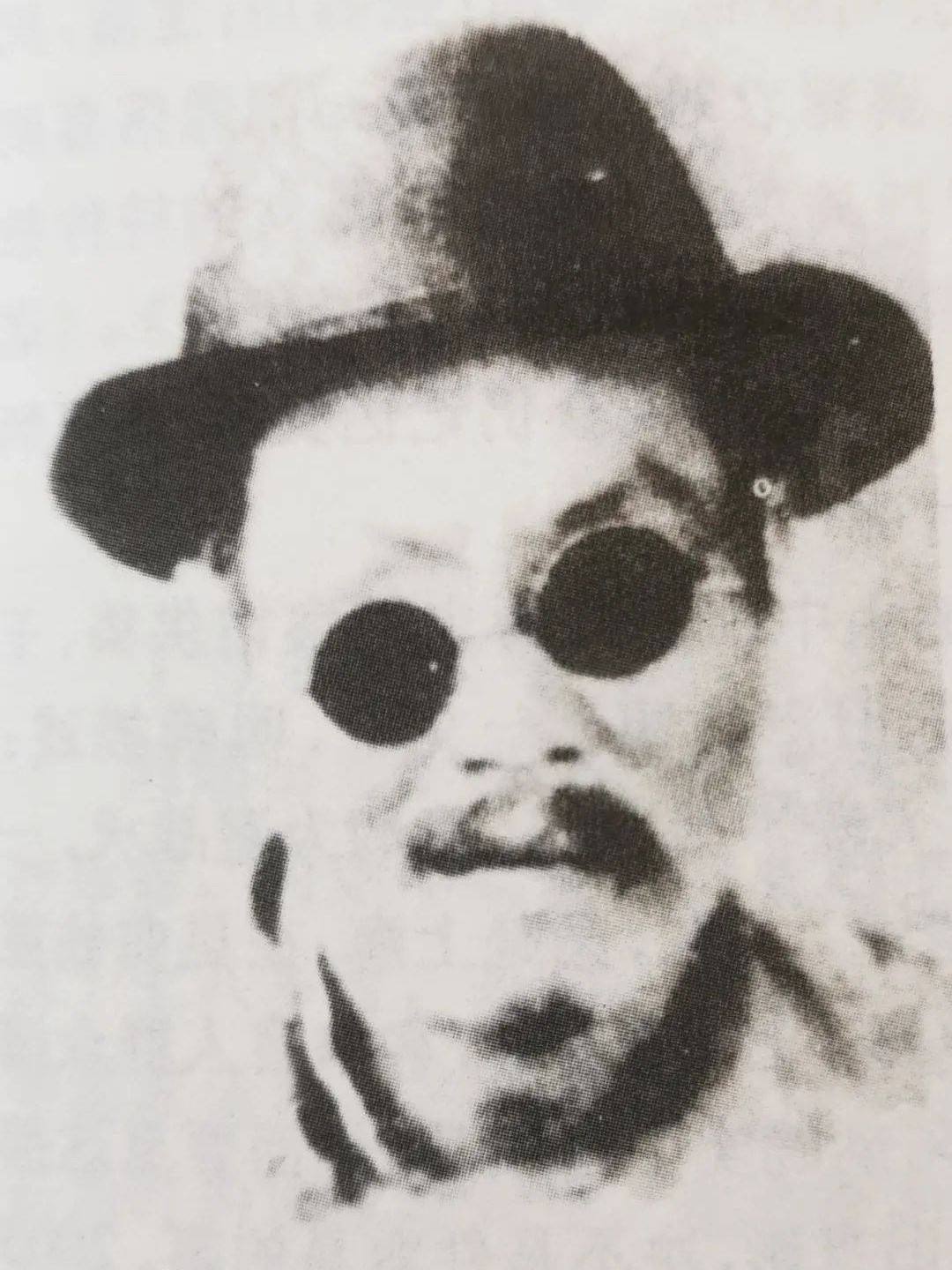
- This is the only extant photograph of Abing, taken from his identity card during the Japanese occupation of Wuxi. The original is now at the Abing Ancestral House Museum in Wuxi.
- Born: Hua Yanjun; 20 August 1893 or 3 November 1898 (Note: Abing's exact birth date is debated. Musicologist Yang Yinliu asserts it to be 20 August 1893, which he claims was supported by Abing's personal testimony. Conversely, musicologist Xu Yihe has argued for the date 3 November 1898, which he claims accords with the testimony of Abing's neighbors, and a now-lost "memorial tablet", purportedly destroyed amidst the Cultural Revolution. See Stock 1996a, pp. 52–53 for further information on this dispute.); Wuxi, Jiangsu province, China
- Died: 4 December 1950 (aged 52–57)
- Occupation: Musician

Abing (Chinese: 阿 炳; pinyin: Ābǐng; 20 August 1893 or 3 November 1898 – 4 December 1950), born Hua Yanjun (simplified Chinese: 华 彦 钧; traditional Chinese: 華彥鈞; pinyin: Huá Yànjūn) was a blind Chinese musician specializing in the erhu and pipa.

== Early life ==
Abing was born as Hua Yanjun on either 20 August 1893 or 3 November 1898, in the eastern Chinese city of Wuxi, Jiangsu province. His father Hua Qinghe was a Taoist priest and musician. His mother was a widow, and her remarriage to a priest was resented by her family; she remained depressed and died a year after Abing's birth. Abing was raised by extended family until the age of eight, when he went to live with his father at the temple. Abing was the name used by his family. He was given the official name Hua Yanjun at this time and sent to school.

Abing's father was proficient in a number of musical instruments and Taoist religious music. His father trained him in drums from the age of 10. Abing began learning the dizi at age 12, then the erhu, undergoing a rigorous set of training, such as playing the flute with weights attached to the end of the flute to increase the power of his wrist. At age 17, Abing first performed in religious ceremonies, and won acclaim for his musical talent, presentation, and voice.

In 1914, upon the death of his father, Abing took charge of the temple along with his cousin. However, badly run operations at the temple, and an opium addiction, drove Abing into poverty.

== Career ==
At the age of 34, he contracted syphilis and progressively lost sight in both his eyes. He became homeless and earned a living as an itinerant street performer. In 1939, he married Dong Cuidi (董 催 弟), a country widow in Jiangyin.

After his marriage, Abing performed every afternoon in a public square in Wuxi. He became famous for incorporating topical issues into his music and songs, especially the war with Japan. After the performance, he would walk through the city's streets, playing the erhu. This was a period of prolificacy for Abing, and his most famous composition, "Erquan Yingyue", was performed in this period.

After the Japanese takeover of Wuxi, Abing travelled to Shanghai, while his wife went to her home village. In Shanghai, Abing played music for a kunqu opera company. In 1939, he returned to Wuxi and his old routine. However, his musical current affairs commentary also irked the authorities, and after 1945 he was prohibited from singing about news items at his usual place of performance. In 1947, Abing experienced a severe bout of lung disease. He stopped performing, and earned a living repairing huqin.

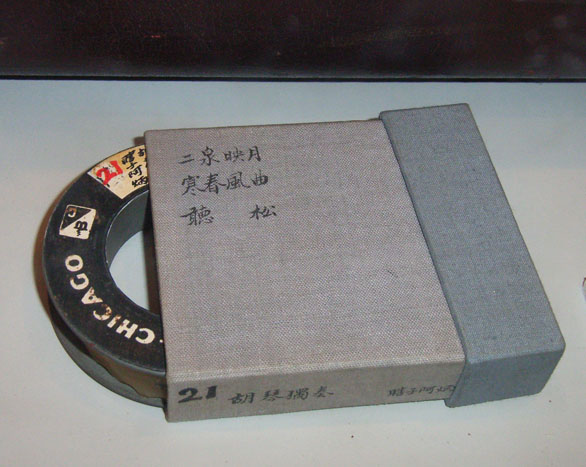
A reel of wire records, from the only extant collection of recordings of Abing's music

In the summer of 1950, two professors of the Central Conservatory of Music, Yang Yinliu and Cao Anhe, both Wuxi natives, travelled to Wuxi to record Abing. By this time, Abing had not performed for almost three years. After three days' practice, and in two sessions, three erhu pieces and three pipa pieces were recorded. However, Abing's favourite piece, Meihua Sannong, was not recorded when the team ran out of blank records.

The recording brought Abing wider acclaim, and in September he was offered a teaching position with the Central Conservatory of Music. However, he was by this time too ill to accept, and died on 4 December 1950. He was buried in the graveyard of the temple where he was born. His wife also died three months later.

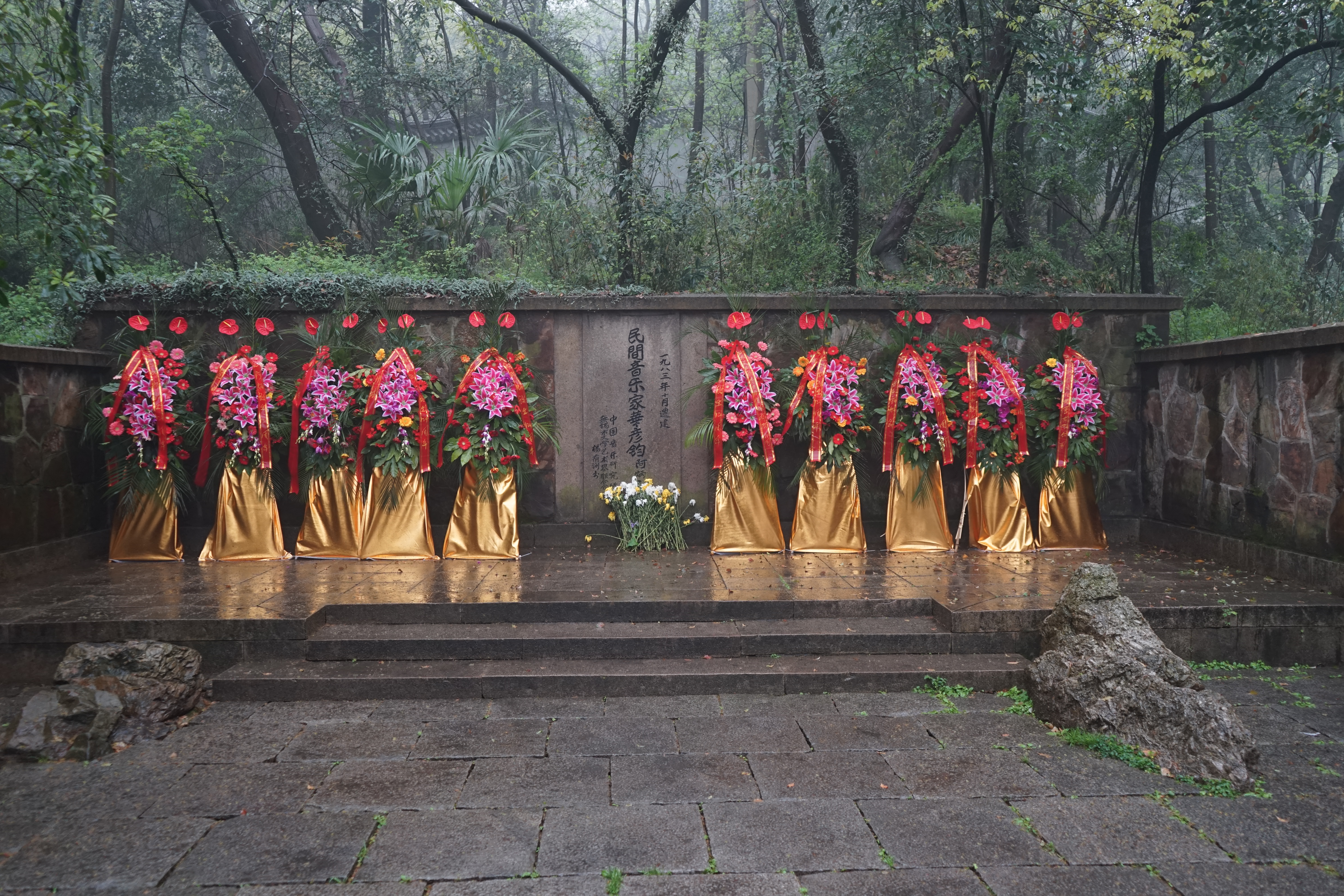
Abing's tomb in Xihui park

== Influence ==
Modern recording of Erquan Yingyue, by Zhang Peijian

Abing's most famous piece is entitled Erquan Yingyue (二泉映月, English: The Moon's Reflection on the Second Spring), which is named after a spring in Wuxi (which is today part of Xihui Park). It is still played as a standard erhu piece, although it necessitates a special set of strings that are tuned lower than normal erhu strings.

He was only recorded very late in his life, but despite the scarcity of documentation of his music, he is nevertheless considered to be one of the most important Chinese musicians of the 20th Century.

His signature pieces have become classics of Chinese erhu and pipa music, such as "Erquan Yingyue."

His music can be heard on The Norton Recordings, ninth edition.

Abing's family home in Wuxi was destroyed by floodwaters in 1991, but rebuilt in 1993 and is now a memorial to Abing and his music.
