= Yang Yinliu =

Chinese musicologist (1899–1984)

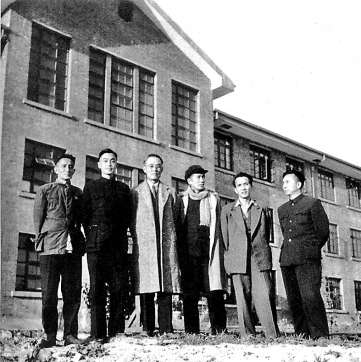
Hong Kong: From left to right: Yang Yinliu, Li Yuanqing, Tan Shuzhen, He Luting, Li Ling, Lu Ji, 1954

Yang Yinliu (simplified Chinese: 杨荫浏; traditional Chinese: 楊蔭瀏; pinyin: Yáng Yìnliú; 10 November 1899 – 25 February 1984) was a Chinese musicologist. Among the leading scholars of Chinese music, "his deep historical knowledge and practical musicianship assure his seminal influence on Chinese music study today." Yinliu's monumental Draft History of Chinese Music (中国古代音乐史稿; Zhongguo gudai yinyue shi gao) was published in 1981.

== Life and career ==
He was the editor of the Zhongguo Yinyue Cidian (中国音乐词典, Dictionary of Chinese Music). He was born in Wuxi, Jiangsu, and was a professor at Central Conservatory of Music in Beijing.

One part of his research was dedicated to the Chinese folk musician Hua Yanjun (Abing) (华彥君- 阿炳, ca. 1893–1950).
