= Jichang Garden =

Garden in Xihui Park, Wuxi, China

Coordinates: 31.581863°N 120.266143°E

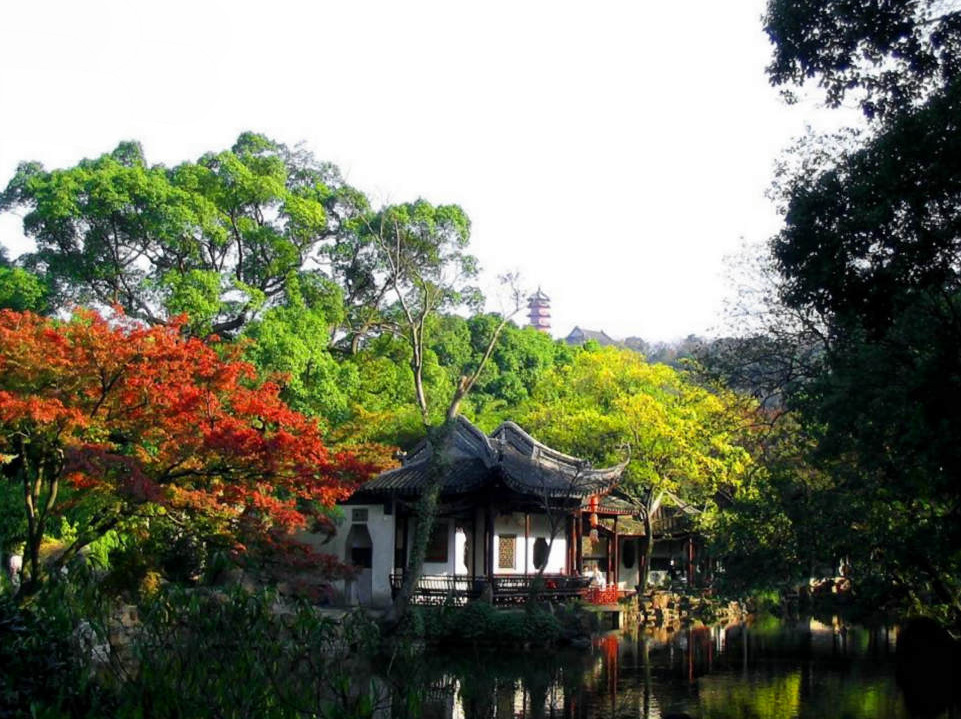
Jichang Yuan

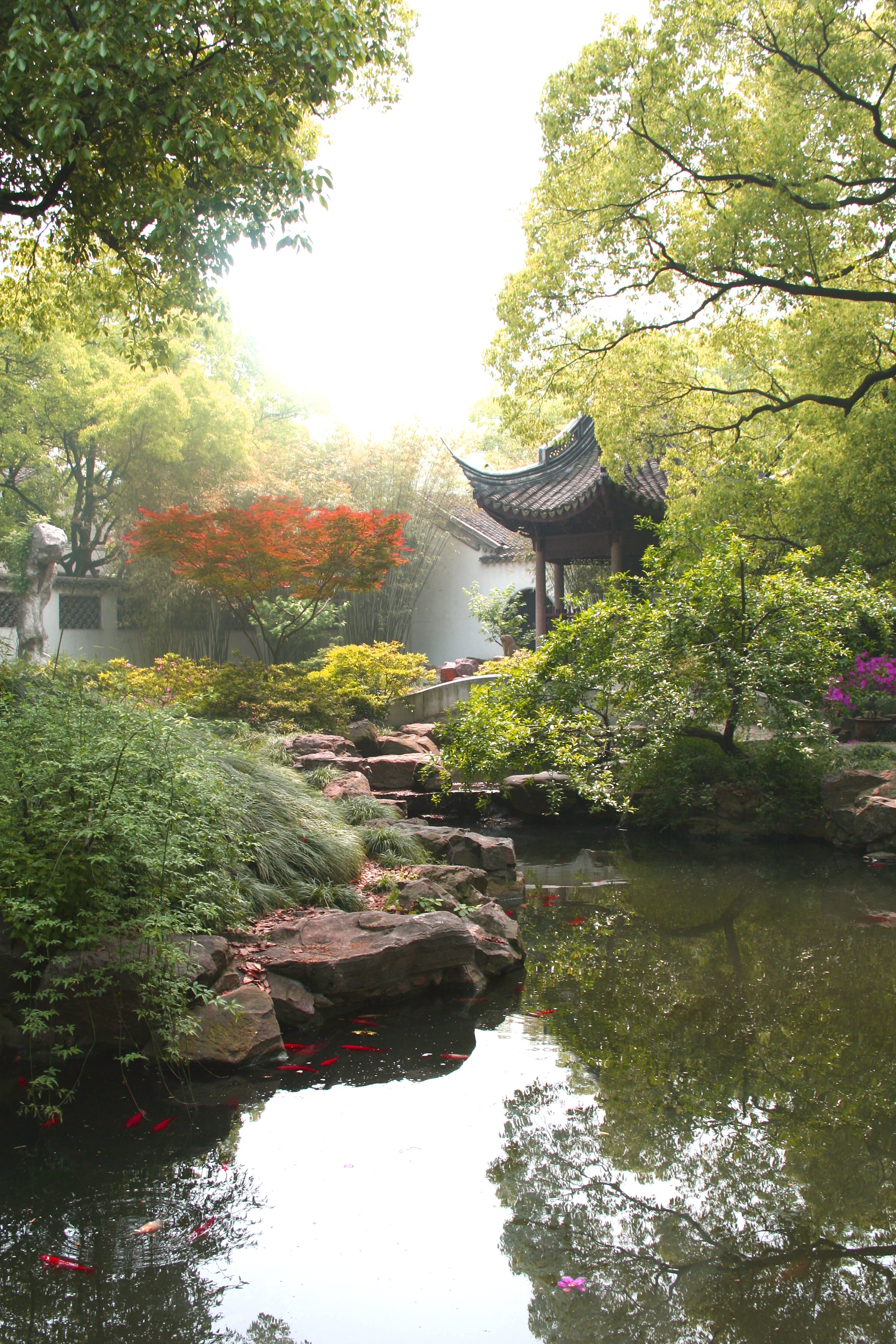

Jichang Garden (Chinese: 寄畅园) is located inside Xihui Park, east side of Huishan, east side of western suburban of Wuxi, Jiangsu Province, China. It is close to Huishan Temple. Jichang Garden is a famed Chinese classical garden in South China, and it was claimed as a national protected location of historical and cultural relics on 13 January 1988. Xiequ Garden (谐趣园) inside the Summer Palace and Guo Ran Da Gong (廓然大公) (or, Double-Crane House 双鹤斋) in Yuanming Yuan in Beijing both imitated Jichang Garden.

== History ==
Jichang Yuan is also called "Qin Yuan" (秦园). The site used to be two monasteries, called "Nan Yin" (南隐) and "Ou Yu" (沤寓). During the Zhengde era (1506–1521) of the Ming dynasty, former director of Nanjing military department, Qin Jin (秦金), purchased monastery "Ou Yu" of Huishan Temple. Qin was a metropolitan graduate in 1493 and also the descendant of Qin Guan, a famous lyricist in the Northern Song dynasty. He expanded it on the basis of old monastery, upraising hills, excavating ponds, planting flowers and trees, building houses, and transforming it to a garden. He named it "Feng Gu Xing Wo" (凤谷行窝), or literally, "Peripatetic Nest of Phoenix Valley". A lot of ancient plants grew in the garden, and there lied a hummock in hind part. This hummock was uplifted in 1445 by the governor of Jiangnan, Zhou Cheng (周忱), in order to alter the geomancy of Huishan Temple. As the garden was founded, Qin Jin wrote a poem "Move to reside in the famed mountain at late age, build an eccentric nest for myself. Winding creeks run around lonesome stones, colossal pine trees foster greenish vines. Gliding birds were seen on the hilltop, few passengers were spotted in the secluded lane. Have a dream in melodious sounds of springs, what a fortune to listen to the fairy jingle." (名山投老住，卜筑有行窝。曲涧盘幽石，长松育碧萝。峰高看鸟渡，径僻少人过。清梦泉声里，何缘听玉珂。) After the death of Qin Jin, the garden was inherited by his family nephew Qin Han and his son, the treasurer of Jiangxi, Qin Liang. In the summer of 1560, Qin Han himself built another garden at the hillside of Huishan, also called "Feng Gu Shan Zhuang" (凤谷山庄), or "Villa of Phoenix Valley".

After the death of Qin Liang, the garden was owned by his nephew, right vice director of court of censors and governor of Huguang, Qin Yao. Qin Yao was a member of Donglin party. In 1591, Qin Yao was deprived of positions because his master, Zhang Juzheng was indicted. He returned to Wuxi in a gloomy mood thus resorted to the picturesque garden to buoy himself up. He borrowed a verse from Wang Xizhi, "Resort to the supremacy of mountains and waters to attain the pleasure." (寄畅山水荫), and changed the name to Jichang Yuan (寄畅园). In the Wanli era of the Ming dynasty, there are 20 noted scenic spots in the garden, and Qin Yao bestowed poems on each of them.

Towards the end of the Shunzhi era and beginning of the Kangxi era of the Qing dynasty, Qin Yao's great grandson Qin Dezao (秦德藻) renovated the garden. He invited the famed garden designer Zhang Lian (张涟) and his nephew Zhang Shi (张轼) to devotedly plan the reconstruction, rearrange hills and waters and dredge springs and pile rockeries. As a result, the sceneries became even more arresting. The Kangxi and Qianlong emperors each came to South China six times in their lifetime, and Jichang Garden was the sine qua non site to stop by every time. This is the heyday of the garden. In the early Yongzheng era during the intermitted period, however, Qin Dezao's first grandson, Qin Daoran, was implicated into the conflicts of authorities and imprisoned. Consequently, the garden was confiscated and its southwestern corner area was excised to build women's chastity shrine (贞节祠) of Wuxi County. In 1736, Qin Daoran's 3rd son, Qin Huitian won a third place in the imperial examination, and was recruited to the South Study Room (南书房) of the emperor. The next year, he made an appeal for his father, and Daoran was released and the garden returned. The richest descendant in Qin's family, Qin Dezao's grandson, offspring of his second wife, Qin Ruixi donated 3,000 silver taels. The aged garden was renovated according to the original plan, and the donor's commitment was applauded.

In 1746, the family gathered and concluded that "rather being maintained primarily for leisure, the garden should erect a family shrine in order for it to last for ever." (惟是园亭究属游观之地，必须建立家祠，始可永垂不朽). Therefore, the "Jiashu Hall" (嘉树堂) in the garden was converted to "Double Filial Affection Shrine" (双孝祠), and Jichang Garden became the property of family shrine, thus also called "Filial Garden" (孝园). In 1751, the Qianlong Emperor visited South China for the first time, and designated Jichang Garden as a resting site. He was very impressed by the beauty of the garden, and brought a painting of it back to Beijing. He ordered to build a "Huishan Garden" on northeast side of Longevity Hill in the Summer Palace, which is now known as the "Xiequ Yuan". During the Xianfeng and Tongzhi eras of the Qing dynasty, most buildings in the garden were ruined in the war, and it was renovated to very little extent later. In 1952, the descendants of Qin's family donated this private garden to the government, and it was protectively refurbished since then. The original chastity shrine was incorporated back into the garden and now became a group of small pavilions called "Bingli Hall" (秉礼堂). Other buildings, such as "Jiu Long Tu Shi", "Jiashu Tang", "Mei Pavilion", and "Ling Fan House", were also rebuilt.

== See also ==
- Gardens in Jiangsu Province
- List of Chinese gardens
