= List of presidents of Tsinghua University =

Chief administrator of Tsinghua University in Beijing, China

The president of Tsinghua University is the chief administrator of Tsinghua University, a national public research university in Beijing, China. After 1992, each president of Tsinghua University is appointed by and is responsible to the Central Committee of the Chinese Communist Party and the State Council, who delegate to him or her the day-to-day running of the university.

The university's current president is Li Luming, who assumed the office in December 2023.

== Presidents of Tsinghua University ==
Period	Year	Photo	President (English name)	President (Chinese name)	Alma mater	Ref
Tsinghua College	February 1911 - April 1912		Zhou Ziqi	周自齐	Columbia University	
Tsinghua College	April 1912 - October 1912		Tang Guoan	唐国安	Yale University	
Tsinghua College	October 1912 - August 1913		Tang Guoan	唐国安	Yale University	
Tsinghua School
Tsinghua School	August 1913 - October 1913		Zhao Guocai	赵国材	St. John's University, Shanghai; Cornell University; University of Wisconsin System	
Tsinghua School	August 1913 - January 1918		Zhou Yichun	周诒春	St. John's University, Shanghai; Cornell University; Yale University	
Tsinghua School	January 1918 - July 1918		Zhao Guocai	赵国材	St. John's University, Shanghai; Cornell University; University of Wisconsin System	
Tsinghua School	January 1918		Fan Yuanlian	范源濂	Tokyo Normal College	
Tsinghua School	April 1918 - January 1920		Zhang Yuquan	张煜全	Yale University; University of California; Peiyang University; University of Tokyo	
Tsinghua School	30 January 1920		Luo Zhongyi	罗忠诒	University of Cambridge	
Tsinghua School	February 1920 - August 1920		Yan Heling	严鹤龄	St. John's University, Shanghai; Columbia University	
Tsinghua School	August 1920 - April 1922		Jin Bangzheng	金邦正	Cornell University; Lehigh University	
Tsinghua School	October 1921 - April 1922		John Wong-Quincey	王文显	University of London; Yale University	
Tsinghua School	April 1922 - May 1924		Cao Yunxiang	曹云祥	St. John's University, Shanghai; Yale University; University of London	
Tsinghua School	May 1924 - January 1928		Cao Yunxiang	曹云祥	St. John's University, Shanghai; Yale University; University of London	
Tsinghua School	January 1928 - April 1928		Yan Heling	严鹤龄	St. John's University, Shanghai; Columbia University	
Tsinghua School	April 1928 - June 1928		Ying-Hsing Wen	温应星	Virginia Military Institute; United States Military Academy	
Tsinghua School	June 1928		Stewart Yui	余日宣	Huachung University; Princeton University; University of Wisconsin System	
Tsinghua School	June 1928 - September 1928		Mei Yiqi	梅贻琦	Worcester Polytechnic Institute	
National Tsinghua University	August 1928 - May 1930		Luo Jialun	罗家伦	Peking University; Princeton University; Columbia University; University of London; Humboldt University of Berlin; University of Paris	
National Tsinghua University	June 1930		Qiao Wanxuan	乔万选	Tsinghua University; Columbia University; University of Wisconsin System	
National Tsinghua University	April 1931 - October 1931		Wu Nanxuan	吴南轩	University of California	
National Tsinghua University	July 1931 - September 1931		Weng Wenhao	翁文灏	Catholic University of Leuven (1834–1968)	
National Tsinghua University	September 1931 - December 1931		Ye Qisun	叶企孙	Tsinghua University; University of Chicago; Harvard University	
National Tsinghua University	October 1931 - July 1937		Mei Yiqi	梅贻琦	Worcester Polytechnic Institute	
Changsha Temporary University	August 1937 - February 1938		Mei Yiqi	梅贻琦	Worcester Polytechnic Institute	
National Southwestern Associated University	May 1938–July 1946		Mei Yiqi	梅贻琦	Worcester Polytechnic Institute	
National Tsinghua University	August 1946–December 1948		Mei Yiqi	梅贻琦	Worcester Polytechnic Institute	
Tsinghua University	December 1948–May 1949		Feng Youlan	冯友兰	Peking University; Columbia University	
Tsinghua University	May 1949–June 1952		Ye Qisun	叶企孙	Tsinghua University; University of Chicago; Harvard University	
Tsinghua University	June 1952–October 1952		Liu Xianzhou	刘仙洲	University of Hong Kong	
Tsinghua University	December 1952–June 1966		Jiang Nanxiang	蒋南翔	Tsinghua University	
Tsinghua University	9 June 1966–January 1972		Red Guards	文化大革命工作组等		
Tsinghua University	25 January 1969–January 1972		Zhang Rongwen	张荣温		
Tsinghua University	January 1972–October 1976		Chi Qun	迟群		
Tsinghua University	April 1977–June 1978		Liu Da	刘达	Beijing period of Fu Jen Catholic University	
Tsinghua University	June 1978–May 1983		Liu Da	刘达	Beijing period of Fu Jen Catholic University	
Tsinghua University	May 1983–October 1988		Gao Jingde	高景德	Northwestern Polytechnical University	
Tsinghua University	October 1988–January 1994		Zhang Xiaowen	张孝文	Tsinghua University	
Tsinghua University	January 1994–April 2003		Wang Dazhong	王大中	Tsinghua University; RWTH Aachen University	
Tsinghua University	April 2003–February 2012		Gu Binglin	顾秉林	Tsinghua University; Aarhus University	
Tsinghua University	February 2012–March 2015		Chen Jining	陈吉宁	Tsinghua University; Brunel University London; Imperial College London	
Tsinghua University	March 2015–February 2022		Qiu Yong	邱勇	Tsinghua University	
Tsinghua University	February 2022–December 2023		Wang Xiqin	王希勤	Tsinghua University	
Tsinghua University	December 2023–		Li Luming	李路明	Tsinghua University	

== Communist Party Secretaries of Tsinghua University ==
Period	Year	Photo	Communist Party Secretary (English name)	Communist Party Secretary (Chinese name)	Alma mater	Ref
Tsinghua University	March 1949 - March 1950		Peng Peiyun	彭珮云	Nanjing University; Tsinghua University	
Tsinghua University	March 1950 - September 1953		He Dongchang	何东昌	National Southwestern Associated University	
Tsinghua University	September 1953 - May 1956		Yuan Yongxi	袁永熙	Communist University of the Toilers of the East	
Tsinghua University	May 1956 - January 1972		Jiang Nanxiang	蒋南翔	Tsinghua University	
Tsinghua University	10 January 1970 - January 1972		Yang Dezhong	杨德中		
Tsinghua University	January 1972 - October 1976		Chi Qun	迟群		
Tsinghua University	April 1977 - July 1982		Liu Da	刘达	Beijing period of Fu Jen Catholic University	
Tsinghua University	July 1982 - February 1984		Lin Ke	林克	Anti Japanese Military and Political University	
Tsinghua University	February 1984 - September 1988		Li Chuanxin	李传信	National Southwestern Associated University; Tsinghua University	
Tsinghua University	September 1988 - September 1995		Fang Huijian	方惠坚	Tsinghua University	
Tsinghua University	September 1995 - February 2002		He Meiying	贺美英		
Tsinghua University	February 2002 - December 2008		Chen Xi	陈希	Tsinghua University	
Tsinghua University	December 2008 - November 2013		Hu Heping	胡和平	Tsinghua University	
Tsinghua University	December 2013 - February 2022		Chen Xu	陈旭	Tsinghua University	
Tsinghua University	February 2022 -		Qiu Yong	邱勇	Tsinghua University	
