= Wang Dazhong =

Chinese nuclear reactor engineer

- 王大中

President of Tsinghua University
- In office January 1994 – April 2003
- Party Secretary: Fang Huijian; He Meiying
- Preceded by: Gu Binglin
- Succeeded by: Zhang Xiaowen

Personal details
- Born: 2 March 1935 (age 91) Changli County, Hebei, Republic of China
- Party: Chinese Communist Party
- Education: Tsinghua University; RWTH Aachen University
- Scientific career
- Fields: Nuclear reactor
- Workplaces: Tsinghua University

Wang Dazhong (Chinese: 王大中; pinyin: Wáng Dàzhōng; born 2 March 1935) is a Chinese nuclear reactor engineer who was president of Tsinghua University, and an academician of the Chinese Academy of Sciences.

== Biography ==
Wang was born in Changli County, Hebei, on 2 March 1935. during the Republic of China. After graduating from Tianjin Nankai High School in 1953, he enrolled in Tsinghua University, where he majored in nuclear reactor. After university, he stayed at the university and worked in the Nuclear Energy Institute. In 1980, he pursued advanced studies in Federal Germany, earning a doctor's degree from RWTH Aachen University in 1982.

He returned to China in October 1982 and continued to work at Tsinghua University as deputy director of the Nuclear Energy Institute. He moved up the ranks to become its president in 1994, a position at vice-ministerial level.

== Contributions ==
Wang participated in the construction of the shielding test reactor "No. 200" with a power of 2000 kW, which is the first nuclear reactor independently designed and built in China. In 1985, he decided to choose the route of shell integrated natural circulation water-cooled reactor and planned to build a 5 MW low-temperature nuclear heating reactor, which is the first integrated natural circulation water-cooled reactor in the world. In 1995, he presided over the construction of "Tsinghua No. 200" 10MW high temperature gas cooled experimental reactor, which is the world's first modular spherical bed high temperature gas cooled reactor and marks that China has mastered the key core technology of modular spherical bed high temperature gas cooled reactor.

== Honours and awards ==
- 1993 Member of the Chinese Academy of Sciences (CAS)
- 3 November 2021 Highest Science and Technology Award
- 2022 Asian Scientist 100, Asian Scientist

Educational offices
| Preceded by Gu Binglin | President of Tsinghua University; 1994–2003 | Succeeded by Zhang Xiaowen |
