= Poropuntius =

Scientific classification
- Kingdom: Animalia
- Phylum: Chordata
- Class: Actinopterygii
- Order: Cypriniformes
- Family: Cyprinidae
- Subfamily: Cyprininae
- Genus: Poropuntius; H. M. Smith, 1931

Type species
- Poropuntius normani H. M. Smith, 1931

Genus of fishes

Poropuntius is a genus of cyprinid fish found mainly in freshwater habitats of South Asia and Yunnan in China, but P. burtoni is from Southeast Asia. Several species have highly restricted ranges and are threatened, and one species, P. speleops is a cavefish.

== Species ==
These are the currently recognized species in this genus:

- Poropuntius alloiopleurus (Vaillant, 1893)
- Poropuntius anlaoensis Hoàng, Phạm & Trần, 2024
- Poropuntius burtoni (Mukerji, 1933)
- Poropuntius carinatus (H. W. Wu & R. D. Lin, 1977)
- Poropuntius chonglingchungi (T. L. Tchang, 1938)
- Poropuntius clavatus (McClelland, 1845)
- Poropuntius cogginii (B. L. Chaudhuri, 1911)
- Poropuntius deauratus (Valenciennes, 1842)
- Poropuntius exiguus (H. W. Wu & R. D. Lin, 1977)
- Poropuntius faucis (H. M. Smith, 1945)
- Poropuntius fuxianhuensis (Y. H. Wang, D. D. Zhuang & L. C. Gao, 1982)
- Poropuntius genyognathus T. R. Roberts, 1998
- Poropuntius hampaloides (Vinciguerra, 1890)
- Poropuntius hathe T. R. Roberts, 1998
- Poropuntius heterolepidotus T. R. Roberts, 1998.
- Poropuntius huangchuchieni (T. L. Tchang, 1962)
- Poropuntius kontumensis (Chevey, 1934)
- Poropuntius krempfi (Pellegrin & Chevey, 1934)
- Poropuntius laoensis (Günther, 1868)
- Poropuntius margarianus (J. Anderson, 1879)
- Poropuntius melanogrammus T. R. Roberts, 1998
- Poropuntius opisthopterus (H. W. Wu, 1977)
- Poropuntius schanicus (Boulenger, 1893)
- Poropuntius shanensis (Hora & Mukerji, 1934)
- Poropuntius speleops (T. R. Roberts, 1991)
- Poropuntius tawarensis (M. C. W. Weber & de Beaufort, 1916)
