= Tchang Tchung-Lin =

Chinese ichthyologist and zoologist (1897–1963)

- 张春霖
- Born: February 1897; Kaifeng, Henan, Qing dynasty
- Died: September 27, 1963 (aged 66); Beijing, China
- Other name: Zhang Chunlin
- Occupations: Ichthyologist, educator
- Known for: Pioneering research on Chinese freshwater and marine fishes

Academic background
- Education: National Southeastern University; University of Paris
- Academic advisor: Bing Zhi

Academic work
- Institutions: Jingsheng Institute of Biology; Beijing Normal University; Institute of Zoology, Chinese Academy of Sciences
- Notable works: Report on the Fish Survey of the Yellow Sea and Bohai Sea (1955); Fishes of the South China Sea (1962); Fishes of the East China Sea (1963); Chinese Carp (1933)
- Influenced: Cheng Qingtai, Li Sizhong, Zheng Ciying, Niu Manjiang and others

The Tchunglinius tchangii is named after him

Tchang Tchung-Lin (Chinese: 张春霖; February 1897 – 27 September 1963), also known as Zhang Chunlin, was a Chinese ichthyologist, zoologist and educator of Mongolian ethnicity. Born in Kaifeng, Henan, he was one of the principal pioneers of modern Chinese ichthyology, alongside Wu Xianwen and Chu Yuan-ting.

Tchang was a founding member of the Zoological Society of China and the Chinese Society of Oceanology and Limnology, and was among the pioneers of biological education in China. His research covered freshwater fish taxonomy, marine fish surveys and zoogeography. He played a leading role in organising systematic investigations of China's marine fish fauna during the 1950s and early 1960s. His publications on the fishes of the Yellow Sea, Bohai Sea, South China Sea and East China Sea became important references for subsequent ichthyological research in China.

== Biography ==
=== Early life and education ===
Tchang was born in February 1897 in Kaifeng, Henan, during the Qing dynasty. He was of Mongolian ethnicity and studied under the zoologist Bing Zhi, who encouraged him to pursue higher education and helped him obtain opportunities to study at university.

In 1922, Tchang moved to Nanjing and began working as an assistant in the biology department of National Southeastern University. In July of that year, he enrolled in its agricultural programme. He graduated in June 1926 with a bachelor's degree in agriculture and subsequently became an assistant at the Biological Research Institute of the Science Society of China.

In August 1928, Tchang went to France to pursue advanced studies in ichthyology at the University of Paris. He studied under the French zoologist Louis Roule and also worked as a researcher at the National Museum of Natural History in Paris. He received a Doctor of Science degree from the University of Paris in October 1930.

=== Academic career ===
After returning to China in 1931, Tchang joined the Jingsheng Institute of Biology in Beiping (present-day Beijing), where he worked as a technical researcher and head of the zoological specimen department.

He simultaneously held teaching and academic positions at several educational institutions, including Peking University, Beijing Normal University, the Sino-French University and China University in Beiping. He also served as dean of the Faculty of Science at Peking University.

From the summer of 1947 until the end of 1951, he served as a professor at Beijing Normal University and at one point also headed its biology department.

In early 1952, Tchang joined the Chinese Academy of Sciences' Committee for Zoological Specimen Organisation. The organisation was reorganised as the Institute of Zoology in 1957. He served as a research fellow and head of its fish research division, leading research on fish taxonomy and classification until his death.

Tchang died in Beijing on 27 September 1963.

== Scientific contributions ==
=== Freshwater fish taxonomy ===
Before the establishment of the People's Republic of China, Tchang primarily studied the taxonomy and distribution of Chinese freshwater fishes.

His early publications included Two New Species of Chinese Cyprinidae (1929), which was among the earliest taxonomic papers independently published by a Chinese ichthyologist describing new fish species. His research helped establish the foundations of modern fish taxonomy in China.

In 1933, he published Chinese Carp, an important monograph on the taxonomy of Chinese cyprinid fishes. It was among the earliest comprehensive academic works on the subject written by a Chinese ichthyologist.

Tchang also contributed to the study of freshwater fish distribution in China. His research helped develop an understanding of the geographical distribution and classification of fish populations in the country's major river systems.

=== Marine fish surveys ===
After the establishment of the People's Republic of China, Tchang increasingly concentrated on marine ichthyology.

Beginning in 1951, he led fish research at the Institute of Zoology of the Chinese Academy of Sciences. He advocated a comprehensive investigation of China's coastal and offshore fish resources to provide scientific information for marine fisheries and national resource management.

Working with his former student Cheng Qingtai at the Qingdao Marine Biology Research Laboratory of the Chinese Academy of Sciences, and collaborating with Chu Yuan-ting of Shanghai Fisheries College, Tchang organised and coordinated systematic marine fish surveys during the 1950s and early 1960s.

These investigations covered four major marine regions: Bohai Sea, Yellow Sea, East China Sea and South China Sea. The results were published in several major reference works, including Report on the Fish Survey of the Yellow Sea and Bohai Sea (1955), Fishes of the South China Sea (1962) and Fishes of the East China Sea (1963).

These publications provided an important overview of China's marine fish fauna and laid the groundwork for subsequent marine fish volumes of the Fauna Sinica series. They continued to be important reference works for Chinese marine ichthyology.

=== Education and scientific organisations ===
Tchang was an important figure in the development of zoological and biological education in modern China. Throughout his academic career, he trained and influenced numerous researchers who subsequently became prominent in ichthyology, zoology and related biological disciplines.

Among the scholars associated with his academic influence were Cheng Qingtai, Li Sizhong, Zheng Ciying, Shi Bainan, Wang Xiangting, Niu Manjiang, Sun Ruyong and Zheng Guangmei.

He was also one of the founders of the Zoological Society of China and the Chinese Society of Oceanology and Limnology, contributing to the establishment of professional scientific organisations in China.

== Selected publications ==
=== Books and monographs ===
- Chinese Carp (中国鲤类志). Jingsheng Institute of Biology, Beiping, 1933.
- Vertebrate Taxonomy (脊椎动物分类学), 1936.
- Palaeozoic Fossil Ichthyology (古生代化石鱼类学), 1950.
- Evolution of Fishes (鱼类的演化), 1951.
- Evolution of Mammals (哺乳类的演化), 1952.
- Systematic Monograph of Chinese Carps (中国系统鲤类志), 1959.
- Monograph of Chinese Catfishes (中国鲇类志), 1960.

=== Edited works ===
- Illustrated Guide to Common Fishes of the Yellow Sea and Bohai Sea (黄渤海习见鱼类图说). Science Press, 1954.
- Report on the Fish Survey of the Yellow Sea and Bohai Sea (黄渤海鱼类调查报告), 1955. This was the first ichthyological monograph published in the People's Republic of China after its establishment in 1949.
- Fishes of the South China Sea (南海鱼类志), 1962.
- Fishes of the East China Sea (东海鱼类志), 1963.
- Chinese Animal Atlas: Fishes (中国动物图谱：鱼类), first edition, five fascicles. Tchang contributed to the preparation and authorship of this series.

== Fish taxa described by Tchang ==
Tchang described numerous new fish species and other taxa during his career, particularly among the Cypriniformes and Siluriformes. His work contributed substantially to the classification of Chinese freshwater fishes.

Selected taxa attributed to his taxonomic work include:

- Parasinilabeo assimilis (異鰾鰍鮀), 1929
- Percocypris pingi (鲈鲤), 1930
- Megalobrama pellegrini (厚颌鲂), 1930
- Xenocypris fangi (方氏鲴), 1930
- Schizothorax prenanti (齐口弓鱼), 1930
- Procypris rabaudi (岩原鲤), 1930
- Triplophysa acuticephala (尖头高原鳅), 1931
- Chanodichthys mongolicus (汪氏近红鲌), 1932
- Cyprinus pellegrini (大头鲤), 1933
- Cyprinus yunnanensis (云南鲤), 1933
- Garra poilanei, 1933
- Acheilognathus omeiensis (峨眉鱊), 1934
- Pseudobagrus kiangsiensis (开封拟鲿), 1934
- Sinogastromyzon tonkinensis and related taxa, 1935

Note: Historical scientific names and current accepted combinations may differ. Taxonomic authorship and synonymy should be checked against current specialist databases before publication.

== Fish named in his honour ==
Several fish taxa have been named in honour of Tchang, reflecting his contributions to ichthyology.

- Acrossocheilus tchangi (张氏繐唇鲃), described in 1935.
- Lepturichthys tchangi (张氏薄鳅), described in 1936.
- Percocypris tchangi (张氏鲈鲤), described in 1936.
- Glyptothorax tchangi (张氏褶鮡), described in 1937.
- Hemiculter tchangi (张氏䱗), described in 1942.
- Phoxinus tchangi (张氏鱥), described in 1988.
- Gobio tchangi, described in 2015.
- Tchunglinius tchangii, a fossil fish taxon described in 2015.
