= Poropuntius carinatus =

Conservation status
- Least Concern (IUCN 3.1)

Scientific classification
- Kingdom: Animalia
- Phylum: Chordata
- Class: Actinopterygii
- Order: Cypriniformes
- Family: Cyprinidae
- Genus: Poropuntius
- Species: P. carinatus

Binomial name
- Poropuntius carinatus H. W. Wu & R. D. Lin, 1977

Species of fish

Poropuntius carinatus is a species of ray-finned fish in the genus Poropuntius from the upper Mekong drainage in Yunnan, Laos, Thailand and probably Myanmar.
