= Juda Refined Salt Company =

Chinese chemical company

The Juda Refined Salt Company (Chinese: 久大精盐公司)was established in 1914 in Tanggu (now part of Binhai, Tianjin) by Fan Xudong and his associates.

== History ==
In 1911, after returning to China from Japan, where he had studied chemistry at Kyoto University, Fan Xudong resolved to establish a modern Taiwan industry. In 1913, he conducted an on-site survey of Tanggu and concluded that the area was suitable for the development of the salt and alkali industry due to its proximity to the Changlu Salt Fields and convenient access to raw materials.

Former Juda Refined Salt Company Building
- 原久大精盐公司大楼
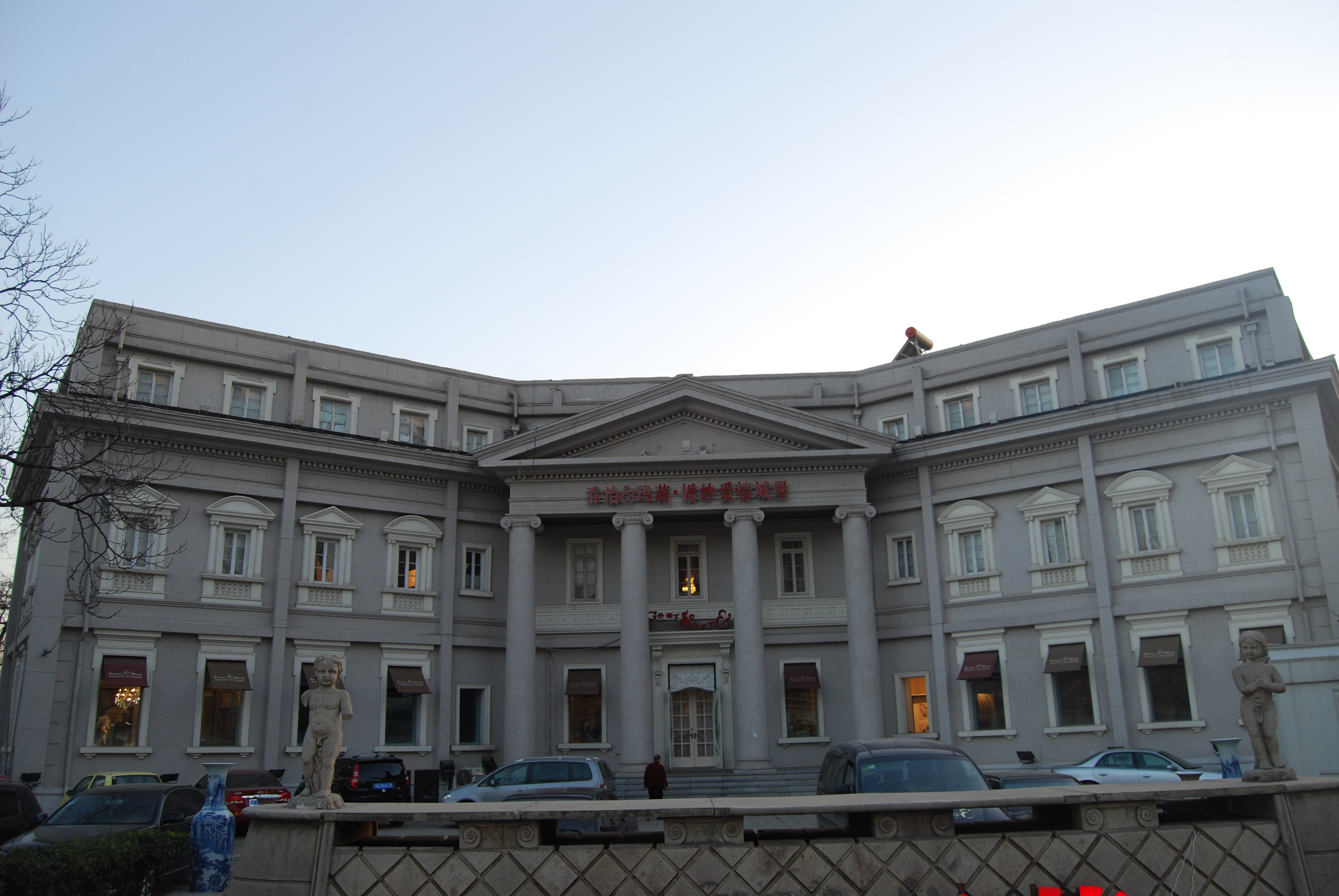

General information
- Location: Tianjin, Tianjin Heping, Tianjin
- Year built: 1920

With the support of his elder brother Fan Yuanlian, then Minister of Education of the Republic of China, as well as associates such as Liang Qichao, the Juda Refined Salt Company was jointly initiated by Fan Xudong, Jing Taobai, Hu Ruitai, Li Jiyun, Hu Senlin, Fang Jilin, and Huang Daxian, with additional sponsorship from Liang Qichao, Fan Yuanlian, Li Sihao, Wang Jiaxiang, Liu Kuiyi, Chen Guoxiang, Zuo Shuzhen, Li Mu, Qian Jinsun, and others. The company applied for registration on July 20, 1914, and was officially approved on September 22 of the same year, establishing a refined salt plant in Tanggu.

The company's shareholders also included prominent military and political figures such as Li Yuanhong, Cao Kun, Cai E, and Feng Yuxiang. On 6 April 1916, the Juda Refined Salt Plant commenced operations. On 11 September of the same year, the first shipment of refined salt was transported from Tanggu to Tianjin for sale, and was subsequently distributed to Hunan, Hubei, Anhui, Jiangxi, and other provinces. During its early years of operation, the plant produced approximately five tons of refined salt per day and generated annual profits of roughly 500,000 to 600,000 yuan. Following the expansion of its eastern plant in 1919, annual production exceeded 60,000 tons.

The establishment of the Juda Refined Salt Plant provided the raw materials, technical expertise, and financial foundation for the later creation of the Yongli Alkali Works, and played an important role in the formation of an industrial system capable of “transforming salt into alkali.”

In November 1947, Hu Shih was elected as a director of the company and later served as its chairman.

== Commemoration ==
After relocating to Zigong, Sichuan, in July 1938, Jiuda Refined Salt Company established the "Jiuda Salt Industry Company Zigong Model Salt Factory." Following the founding of the People's Republic of China, it was placed under local management and became one of the first companies to undergo joint Public–private joint management, establishing the "Joint Public-Private Zigong Jiuda Salt Industry Co., Ltd." After several changes, when Zigong's salt industry underwent restructuring in March 1991, it reverted to the name "Jiuda," establishing Sichuan Jiuda Salt Industry (Group) Company, which has led the Zigong salt industry ever since. In 2011, the Chinese television series "Boiling the Sea" commemorated the centenary of the 1911 Revolution and highlighted the founding of the Chinese national chemical industry by industrialists such as Fan Xudong, Hou Debang, and Li Zhuchen, representing companies like Jiuda Refined Salt, Tianjin Alkali Plant, and the Huanghai Chemical Industry Research Institute.

== Related Works ==
- 赵津, Zhaojin. “永久黄”团体档案汇编:永利化学工业公司专辑 [Collected Archival Materials of the “Yong–Jiu–Huang” Group: Volume on Yongli Chemical Industry Company] (in Chinese). Tianjin: Tianjin People's Publishing House. ISBN 7-80515649-2.
