= Poropuntius chonglingchungi =

Conservation status
- Critically endangered, possibly extinct (IUCN 3.1)

Scientific classification
- Kingdom: Animalia
- Phylum: Chordata
- Class: Actinopterygii
- Order: Cypriniformes
- Family: Cyprinidae
- Genus: Poropuntius
- Species: P. chonglingchungi

Binomial name
- Poropuntius chonglingchungi (T. L. Tchang, 1938)

Synonyms
- Barbus chonglingchungi Tchang, 1938; Barbodes chonglingchungi (Tchang, 1938); Barbodes lacustris Wu, 1977; Puntius pachygnathus Wang, Zhuang & Gao, 1982

Species of fish

Poropuntius chonglingchungi is a species of ray-finned fish in the genus Poropuntius. The species is only known from Fuxian Lake in Yunnan; it enters streams for spawning. It has been impacted by introduced species, the loss of spawning habitat, and over-fishing. It has not been recorded since the 1980s; IUCN considers it as Critically Endangered and possibly extinct.
