= Poropuntius cogginii =

Scientific classification
- Kingdom: Animalia
- Phylum: Chordata
- Class: Actinopterygii
- Order: Cypriniformes
- Family: Cyprinidae
- Genus: Poropuntius
- Species: P. cogginii

Binomial name
- Poropuntius cogginii (B. L. Chaudhuri, 1911)

Synonyms
- Barbus cogginii Chaudhuri, 1911; Barbodes cogginii (Chaudhuri, 1911); Barbodes daliensis H. W. Wu & R. D. Lin, 1977; Poropuntius daliensis (Wu & Lin, 1977); Barbus gregorii Norman, 1923; Barbus susanae Banister, 1973; Barbus yunnanensis Fowler, 1958

Species of fish

Poropuntius cogginii is a species of ray-finned fish in the genus Poropuntius. It is endemic to Lake Erhai in Dali, Yunnan.
