= Jin Bangzheng =

- 金邦正
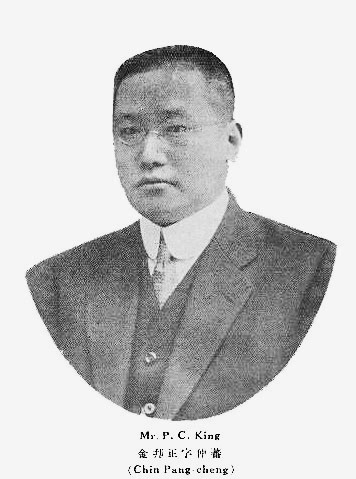
- Jin Bangzheng

President of Tsinghua University
- In office August 1920 – April 1922
- Preceded by: Yan Heling
- Succeeded by: John Wong-Quincey

Personal details
- Born: 1886 Yi County, Anhui, Qing Empire
- Died: 1946 (aged 59–60) Beijing, Republic of China
- Parent: Jin Qing'ci
- Education: Cornell University; Lehigh University
- Occupation: Educator, industrialist

Jin Bangzheng (Chinese: 金邦正; pinyin: Jīn Bāngzhèng; Wade–Giles: Chin Pang-cheng; 1886–1946), or P. C. King, courtesy name Zhongfan (Chinese: 仲藩), was a Chinese educator and industrialist who served as president of Tsinghua University from August 1920 to April 1922.

== Biography ==
Jin was born in Yuting Town of Yi County, Anhui, in 1886, to Jin Qing'ci (Chinese: 金庆慈; ?-1905), an official in the Qing government. His elder brother Jin Bangping (Chinese: 金邦平) was an official and industrialist in the late Qing dynasty and the early Republic of China. He primarily studied at old-style private schools in both Tianjin and Beijing cities. After graduating from Nankai High School, he was sent abroad to study at the expense of the Qing government. He pursued advanced studies in the United States, first earning a master's degree in silviculture from Cornell University and then bachelor's degree in science from Lehigh University in 1914. He helped initiation of the Science Society of China with Ren Hongjun, Yang Xingfo, Guo Tanxian, etc.

He returned to China after graduation and worked as a teacher in universities and colleges. In 1920 he was appointed president of Tsinghua University, and held that office until April 1922. Then he founded the Yaohua Flat Glass Factory in Qinhuangdao, Hebei. Later he was manager of Shanghai Commercial Saving Bank in Beijing. He died in 1946.

Educational offices
Preceded by Yan Heling (严鹤龄)	President of Tsinghua University; 1920–1922	Succeeded by John Wong-Quincey (王文显)
