= Ye Qisun =

Chinese physicist (1898–1977)

Ye Qisun 叶企孙
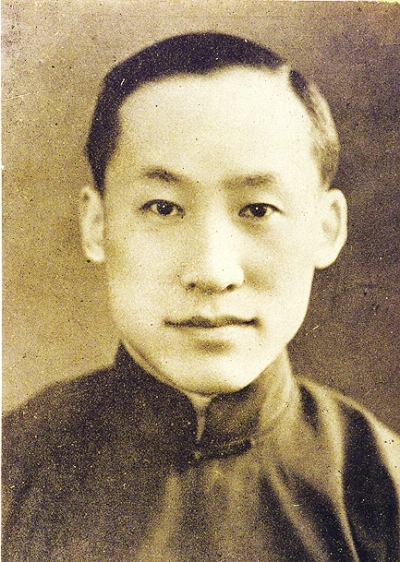
- Born: 16 July 1898; Shanghai, Qing dynasty China
- Died: 13 January 1977 (aged 78); Beijing, People's Republic of China
- Education: Tsinghua University; University of Chicago; Harvard University
- Known for: Ye Qisun Prize
- Scientific career
- Fields: Physics
- Doctoral advisor: William Duane
- Notable students: Tsung-Dao Lee

Ye Qisun (simplified Chinese: 叶企孙; traditional Chinese: 葉企孫; Wade–Giles: Yeh Ch'i-sun; July 16, 1898 – January 13, 1977), also named Ye Hongjuan (叶鸿眷), was a Chinese physicist and one of the founders of modern physics in China.

== Education ==
Ye's family had a very strong educational background. His great-grandfather served in a government office during the Qing Dynasty and contributed official records for an edition of Shanghai History. His grandfather Ye Jiazhen (叶佳镇) worked in The Imperial College. His father Ye Jingyun (叶景澐) was a successful candidate in the imperial examinations at the provincial level, and was designated as the headmaster of Jingye School (敬业学堂), as well as a Chinese professor at Tsinghua University and the chairman of the Shanghai Education Association.

In 1907, Ye attended Jingye School, where his father had served as headmaster. In 1911, he was admitted to Tsinghua University, graduating in 1918. He later traveled to America to study physics at the University of Chicago and Harvard University. In 1923, he obtained his doctorate in physics at Harvard, under the supervision of William Duane. Mr. Duane, Ye and H. Palmer successfully posted the academic article A re-measurement of the Radiation constant, h, by means of X-Rays at National Academy of Sciences.

After traveling to Europe, he became an associate professor of physics at the National Southeastern University in Nanjing (later Nanjing University) in April 1924.

== Teaching ==
=== Before Sino-Japanese War ===
In 1924, he became part of the faculty at National Southeast University as an assistant professor and joined the Chinese Science Association. He was then recruited by Tsinghua University in 1925 and became a full professor in 1926. He brought his students Chung-Yao Chao and Ruwei Shi to the university.

In 1926, he founded the department of physics at Tsinghua and became its first chair. In 1929, the university created the school of science, and Ye became the dean as well as one of the seven core senior executive administrators of the university. From 1926 to 1937, he hired Xiong Qinglai, Wu Youxun, Sa Bendong, Zhang Zigao, Huang Ziqing, Zhou Peiyuan, Chung-Yao Chao and Ren Zhigong to be professors at Tsinghua, agreeing to pay Wu Youxun a higher salary than his own. Additionally, Ye supported Xiong Qinglai's approval of Hua Luogeng to teach at Tsinghua, despite the latter only having a middle school diploma. Later Ye recommended Hua to the University of Cambridge.

=== During WWII and the Chinese Civil War ===
During the Sino-Japanese War, Ye and his student Xiong Dazhen transferred assets from Tsinghua University to the National Southwestern Associated University. Ye was supposed to send Xiong to graduate schools in Germany, but Xiong insisted on joining the military in the effort against Japanese invasion. Consequently, Xiong joined the Jizhong Communist Anti-Japanese Areas, led by General Lü Zhengcao. Xiong taught bomb technology and bought wireless utilities through Ye's network, significantly resolving the shortage of weapons suffered by the Eighth Route Army. Xiong later died in the Chinese Civil War.

Ye went to National Southwestern Associated University to continue teaching physics as the chair of the university's department of physics. In 1946, he recommended Tsung-Dao Lee to study abroad in the United States, although Lee had not yet graduated. Lee subsequently won the Nobel Prize in Physics in 1957.

=== After the founding of the People's Republic of China ===
In 1949, Ye came back to Beijing after the Chinese Civil War. After three years he moved to teach at Peking University. Ye was elected as a member of the Chinese Academy of Sciences in 1955. He was also a founder of the Chinese Physical Society.

Ye asked the government to clarify the death of Xiong Dazhen, foreshadowing the Cultural Revolution. During the Cultural Revolution, Lü Zhengcao was persecuted. Ye was implicated in a case involving Xiong and was persecuted as well. Ye suffered from continued abuse and developed mental health issues. In 1969, he was released back to Peking University, but was still isolated as "a suspect of a Central Bureau of Investigation and Statistics agent".

When his student Qian Sanqiang met him and attempted to greet him, Ye asked his student to leave him to avoid potentially implicating Qian. Other than Qian, Zhao Yuanren, Ren Zhigong, Lin Jiaqiao, Dai Zhenduo, Chen Ning Yang requested visits with him, but received refusals from the government.

In 1975, his isolation was ended and his students Chen Daisun, Wu Youxun, Wang Zhuxi and Qian Weichang were finally able to visit him. Ye died on January 13, 1977.

=== Awards ===
In 2000, the Chinese Physical Society established five prizes, namely the Hu Gangfu prize, Rao Yutai prize, Ye Qisun prize, Wu Youxun prize and Wang Ganchang prize in recognition of five pioneers of modern physics in China. The Ye Qisun Prize is awarded to physicists involved in Condensed matter physics.

== Contribution ==
Ye Qisun was a renowned Chinese physicist and one of the founders of modern physics in China.

Many famous scientists, such as Zhao Yuanren, Ren Zhigong, Lin Jiaqiao, Dai Zhenduo, Chen Ning Yang, Chen Daisui, Wu Youxun, Wang Zhuxi, Tsung-Dao Lee, Qian Sanqiang, Chien Wei-zang were his students. In 1999, Chinese government awarded 23 founding fathers of Chinese space program as "Fathers of Two Bombs (atomic bomb and hydrogen bomb) and One Star (artificial satellite)". Over half of them used to be his students; therefore, Ye was generally hailed as "the master of masters".
