= Poropuntius exiguus =

Scientific classification
- Kingdom: Animalia
- Phylum: Chordata
- Class: Actinopterygii
- Order: Cypriniformes
- Family: Cyprinidae
- Genus: Poropuntius
- Species: P. exiguus

Binomial name
- Poropuntius exiguus (H. W. Wu & R. D. Lin, 1977)

Synonyms
- Barbodes exigua Wu & Lin, 1977

Species of fish

Poropuntius exiguus is a species of ray-finned fish in the genus Poropuntius that is endemic to Lake Erhai in China. It has not been recorded since the 1970s and it is possibly extinct.
