= Mei Yiqi =

Chinese-born politician, physicist, and academic administrator (1889–1962)

Mei Yi-chi
- 梅貽琦
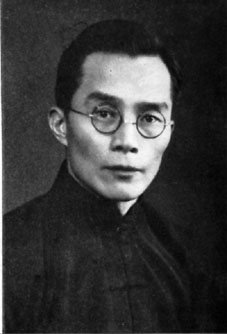

Minister of Education of the Republic of China
- In office 19 July 1958 – 1 March 1961
- Preceded by: Zhang Qiyun
- Succeeded by: Huang Jilu
- In office 22 December 1948 – 21 March 1949
- Preceded by: Zhu Jiahua
- Succeeded by: Chen Hsueh-ping (acting); Han Lih-wu

Chairman of Atomic Energy Council
- In office 19 July 1958 – 1 March 1961
- Preceded by: Zhang Qiyun
- Succeeded by: Li Ximou (acting)

President of National Tsing Hua University
- In office September 1956 – 19 May 1962
- Preceded by: New position
- Succeeded by: Chen Ke-chung (acting)
- In office 14 October 1931 – 15 December 1948
- Preceded by: Ye Qisun
- Succeeded by: Feng Youlan

Personal details
- Born: 29 December 1889 Tianjin, Qing China
- Died: 19 May 1962 (aged 72) Taipei, Taiwan
- Party: Kuomintang
- Spouse: Han Yonghua
- Children: 5
- Parent: Mei Bochen
- Education: Nankai School; Worcester Polytechnic Institute (BS)
- Occupation: Politician, physicist, educator

Chinese name
- Traditional Chinese: 梅貽琦
- Simplified Chinese: 梅贻琦
Transcriptions
Standard Mandarin
- Hanyu Pinyin: Méi Yìqí
- Wade–Giles: Mei I-ch'i

Yuehan
- Chinese: 月涵
Transcriptions
Standard Mandarin
- Hanyu Pinyin: Yuèhán

Mei Yiqi or Mei Yi-chi (Chinese: 梅貽琦; 29 December 1889 – 19 May 1962), courtesy name Yuehan (Chinese: 月涵), was a Chinese educator who served as the president of National Tsinghua University between 1931 and 1948, making him the university's longest serving president. He also served two separate terms as Ministry of Education of the Republic of China, from 1948 to 1949 and from 1958 to 1961.

== Biography ==
Mei was born in Tianjin on 29 December 1889, to a merchant family. His father Mei Bochen (Chinese: 梅伯忱) was a small merchant. His ancestral home in Wujin District, Changzhou, Jiangsu Province. In 1904, at the age of 15, he attended Nankai School, becoming a student of Zhang Boling. He completed secondary study at Baoding Higher School. In August 1909, he was sent to the U.S. as one of the first group of Boxer Indemnity Scholarship Program students. He attended Lawrence Academy in Groton, Massachusetts from 1909-1910. He received his bachelor's degree in electrical engineering from the Worcester Polytechnic Institute.

He returned to China after graduation in 1914 and worked at YMCA in Tianjin for a year. In autumn of that same year, he became an instructor in physics and mathematics at National Tsing Hua University (now Tsinghua University), where he was elected President in 1931. Under Mei's leadership, the university retained and recruited a host of top talents to its faculty. As of 1946, nearly half of the faculty members held PhD degrees, and over 90% studied abroad, including graduates from Harvard, MIT, Cornell, Chicago, and Columbia of the United States. Mei valued liberal education as much as science and technology, a perspective shaped by his observation of the U.S. education system.

In 1937 after the Japanese invasion, most of the faculty and students in Beijing fled southwest. On 4 May 1938, the National Southwestern Associated University opened in Kunming, Yunnan, a merger of Peking, Nankai, and the National Tsing Hua University. Mei was appointed the chief administrator. Mei's leadership and generosity helped to keep the school alive through the dark years of the Sino-Japanese war. He oversaw the rebuilding and reopening of the campus in Beijing on 10 October 1946, and served as president until 12 December 1948.

In December 1948, he flew out of Beijing on a Kuomintang plane as the civil war heated up. He was appointed Ministry of Education of the Republic of China, but held the position for only one year. After the defeat of the Kuomintang by the Communists in Chinese Civil War in 1949, Mei left China and spent six years in the US, working with the China Foundation (中华文化教育基金会) who managed the Boxer Indemnity fund that supported 4000 Chinese students financially.

Mei became the first president of the National Tsing Hua University in Hsinchu in 1955, and was appointed Minister of Education of Taiwan in 1958. In February 1962, he was elected an academician of the Academia Sinica.

On 19 May 1962, he died of cancer at National Taiwan University Hospital, in Taipei, Taiwan.

== Families ==
Mei married Han Yonghua (Chinese: 韓詠華) in 1919 in Tianjin. The couple had one son and four daughters: Mei Zutong (Chinese: 梅祖彤), Mei Zufen (Chinese: 梅祖芬), Mei Zuyan (Chinese: 梅祖彥), Mei Zubin (Chinese: 梅祖彬) and Mei Zushan (Chinese: 梅祖杉). Mei Yiqi was the brother of Mei Yi-pao (Chinese: 梅貽寶), and uncle of Mei Tsu-lin.

== Works ==
- 梅貽琦西南聯大日記 [Diary of Mei Yi-chi in National Southwestern Associated University] (in Chinese). Zhong Hua Book Company. 2018. ISBN 9787101131857.
- 中國的大學 [Universities and Colleges in China] (in Chinese). Beijing: Beijing Institute of Technology Press. 2012. ISBN 9787564059446.
- 梅貽琦自述 [Autobiography of Mei Yi-chi] (in Chinese). Anhui: Anhui literature and Art Publishing House. 2013. ISBN 9787539643670.

== Legacy ==
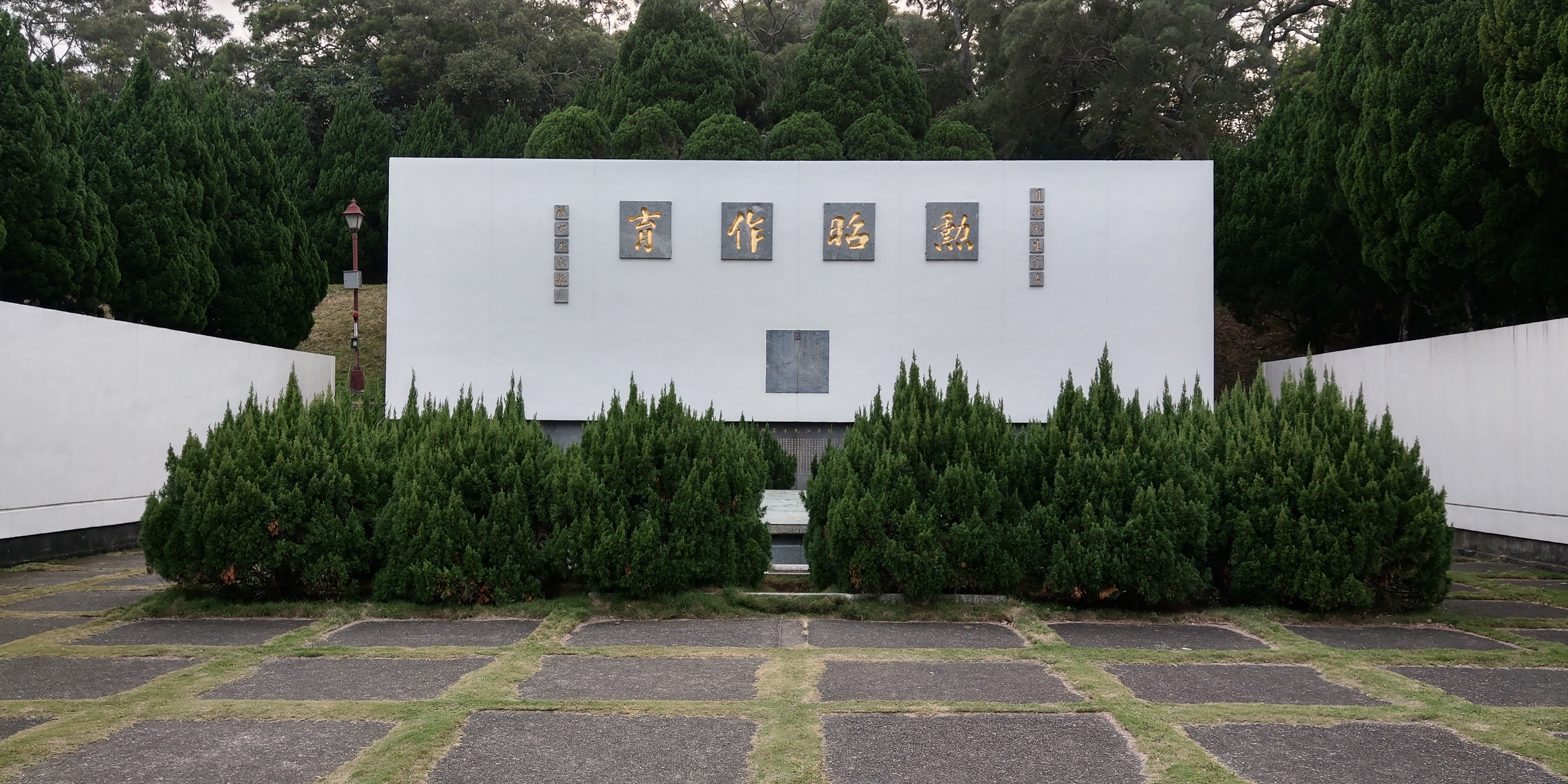
Garden of Mei

At his inauguration as Tsinghua University's president on December 3, 1931, Mei delivered one of the most famous quotes: "A university is not defined by its grand buildings, but by its great masters." He himself was never called a "master," but during his tenure, he recruited many masters to campus and nurtured numerous masters for future generations. Mei was highly regarded by faculties, students, and alumni of both the Tsinghua University at Beijing, and the National Tsing Hua University in Taiwan. He was being remembered as the "Eternal President". Mei was buried in National Tsing Hua University campus, his tomb was named "Garden of Mei" (Chinese: 梅園).

Government offices
Preceded by Zhu Jiahua	Minister of Education of the Republic of China; 1948–1949	Succeeded by Chen Xueping (陳雪屏)
Preceded by Zhang Qiyun	Minister of Education of the Republic of China; 1958–1961	Succeeded by Huang Jilu (黃季陸)
Preceded by Zhang Qiyun	Chairman of Atomic Energy Council; 1958–1962	Succeeded by Li Ximou (acting) (李熙謀)
Educational offices
Preceded by Wen Yingxing (溫應星)	Supervisor of Tsinghua School; 1928–1928	Succeeded by Luo Jialun
Preceded by Ye Qisun (acting)	President of National Tsinghua University; 1931–1948	Succeeded by Feng Youlan
New title	President of National Tsing Hua University in Hsinchu City; 1956–1962	Succeeded by Chen Kezhong (acting) (陳可忠)
New title	Chairman of Institute of Geophysics, National Central University; 1962–1962	Succeeded by Pu Xuefeng (浦薛鳳)
