= Science Society of China =

Former science organization in China (1914–1960)

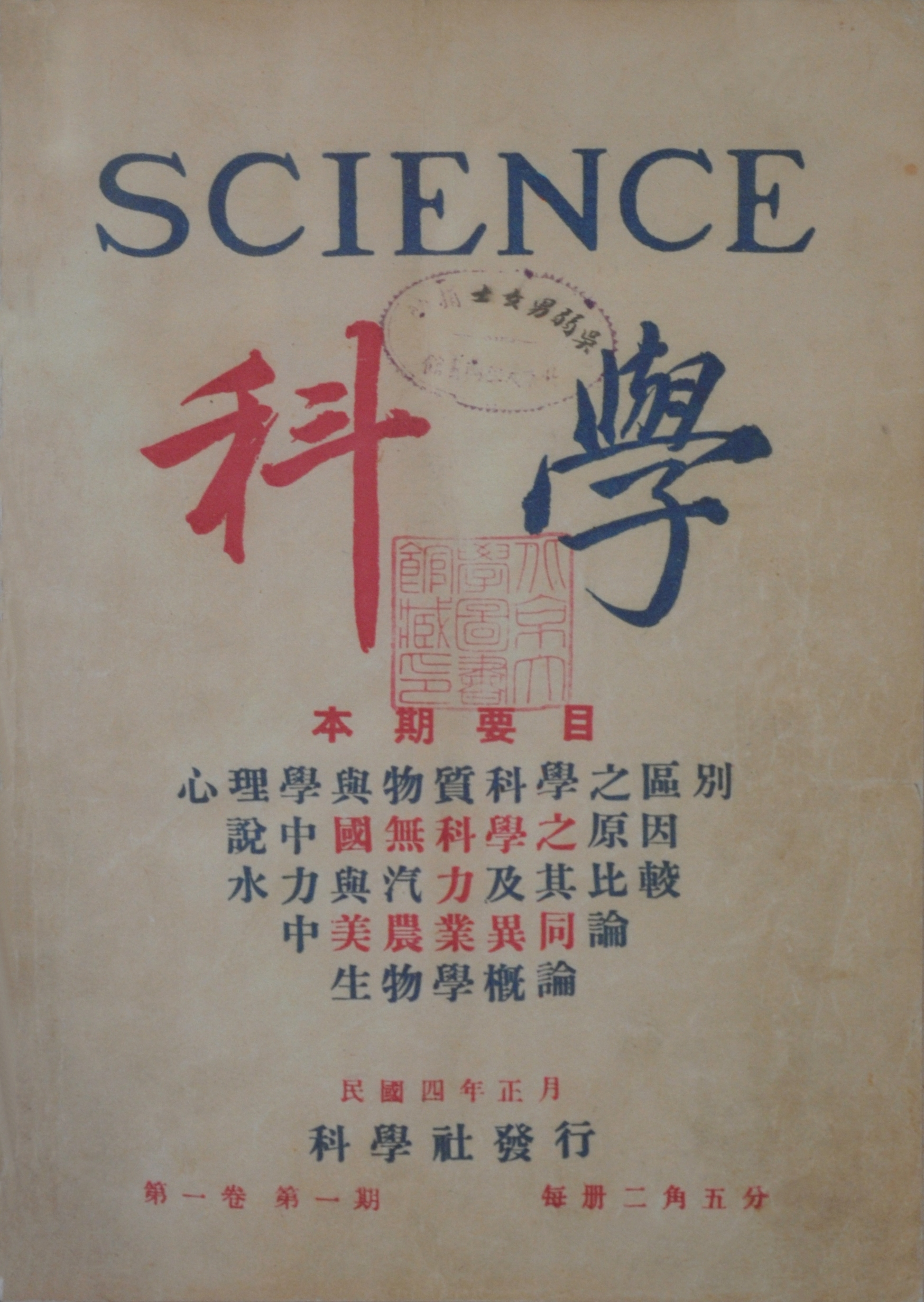
Science magazine Vol. 1 No. 1, published in 1915

The Science Society of China (simplified Chinese: 中国科学社; traditional Chinese: 中國科學社; 1914–1960) was the first comprehensive civil scientific organization in modern China, and the largest and most influential scientific society in the country during the first half of the 20th century. It was founded in 1914 by a group of Chinese students at Cornell University, including H. C. Zen (Ren Hongjun), P. C. King (Bing Zhi), Zhou Ren, H. C. Yang (Yang Xingfo), Hu Mingfu, Y. R. Chao (Zhao Yuanren), Guo Tanxian, Zhang Yuanshan, and Jin Bangzheng. Modeled on the American Association for the Advancement of Science (AAAS), the Society declared its mission as "advocating science, promoting industry, standardizing terminology, and disseminating knowledge."

The Society was the leading scientific organization in China prior to the establishment of the government-sponsored Academia Sinica (1928) and Chinese Academy of Sciences (1949). Its members constituted what scholars have called China's "first generation of scientists," who drove the institutionalization of science and technology, founded multiple research disciplines, and cultivated a scientific culture in China. The Society's journal Science (科学), established in 1915, was the first comprehensive Chinese-language science monthly and remained in continuous publication for over half a century.

== Historical background ==
In the late 19th and early 20th centuries, China's defeat in the First Sino-Japanese War (1894–1895) and the subsequent national crisis sparked a "science to save the nation" (科学救国) movement among Chinese intellectuals. The Qing dynasty and later the early Republic of China government sent large numbers of students abroad to the United States, Japan, and Europe, many of whom pursued engineering and natural sciences. However, China at the time had no systematic civil scientific organization and lacked a comprehensive periodical for disseminating modern scientific knowledge to the general public. It was in this institutional vacuum that overseas Chinese students began planning an academic organization modeled on Western scientific societies.

== Founding and early development ==
In 1914, nine Chinese students at Cornell University founded the "Science Society" (科学社), taking the American Association for the Advancement of Science as their organizational model and its journal Science as the template for their own publication. The founding members were Ren Hongjun (H. C. Zen), Bing Zhi (P. C. King), Zhou Ren, Hu Mingfu, Zhao Yuanren (Y. R. Chao), Yang Xingfo (H. C. Yang), Guo Tanxian, Zhang Yuanshan, and Jin Bangzheng.

In January 1915, the first issue of Science (科学) was published in Shanghai. The inaugural editorial declared that "science and democracy" were the twin foundations for China's renewal and that the journal's mission was "to spread the world's latest scientific knowledge." Later that year, the organization was renamed the "Science Society of China," and Ren Hongjun became its first president.

As the founding members gradually returned to China after completing their studies, the Society moved its headquarters to Nanjing in 1918, operating from Nanjing Higher Normal School (later National Southeastern University).

== Major activities and institutions ==
=== Publishing ===
Science (科学) was the core publication of the Society. For decades it introduced Chinese readers to the latest developments across all fields of natural science—physics, chemistry, biology, geology, and others—and played a vital role in standardizing Chinese scientific terminology. The Society also launched Science Pictorial (科学画报) for popular audiences and Science Translations (科学译丛), further expanding the reach of scientific knowledge in China.

=== Biological Laboratory ===
In 1922, Bing Zhi (P. C. King) and Hu Xiansu (H. H. Hu) established the Science Society of China Biological Laboratory in Nanjing—the first modern pure-science research institution in China. The laboratory had both zoological and botanical divisions and, from 1925 to 1942, published the Contributions from the Biological Laboratory of the Science Society of China, which featured internationally recognized research.

=== Fan Memorial Institute of Biology ===
In 1928, Bing Zhi and Hu Xiansu founded the Fan Memorial Institute of Biology (静生生物调查所) in Beijing, named in memory of Fan Yuanlian (Fan Jing-sheng), a former Chinese Minister of Education. The institute focused on the systematic survey and taxonomic study of plant and animal resources in northern and southern China. It published the Bulletin of the Fan Memorial Institute of Biology intermittently from 1929 to 1948. The institute later evolved into the present-day Institute of Zoology and Institute of Botany of the Chinese Academy of Sciences.

=== Libraries ===
The Society established scientific libraries in several cities for use by members and the general public. The most notable was the Mingfu Library (明复图书馆) in Shanghai, named in memory of the founding member Hu Mingfu, who died young. The building, the Former site of the Science Society of China and Mingfu Library, survives to the present day.

=== Assistance in founding Academia Sinica ===
In 1928, with members of the Science Society of China serving as the core academic cadre, Academia Sinica (中央研究院) was formally established in Nanjing as the highest national academic research institution of the Republic of China. The establishment of Academia Sinica marked the transition of scientific research in China from civil initiative to state institution.

== Dissolution ==
After the founding of the People's Republic of China in 1949, the Chinese Academy of Sciences (CAS) and the China Association for Science and Technology (CAST) were successively established, assuming functions that had previously been performed by civil scientific organizations. The Society's journals, libraries, research equipment, and other assets were gradually transferred to CAS, Science Press, the Shanghai Science Popularization Association, the Shanghai Library, and other state and local institutions. The Science Society of China formally dissolved in 1960, after approximately 45 years of existence.

== Legacy and historical significance ==
The founders and participants of the Science Society of China were a group of intellectuals who shared the conviction that science could save the nation. They not only translated and disseminated modern Western scientific knowledge but also, at both the ideological and practical levels, advanced the institutionalization of science and technology in China. Their work laid the foundation for the establishment of multiple modern academic disciplines, the development of higher education, and the formation of a national scientific research system.

The student group associated with the Science Society and its journal Science has been recognized by scholars as China's "first generation of scientists." The journal Science continued publication for over half a century, systematically introducing international advances across the natural sciences while cultivating public awareness of and interest in science—making it a landmark publication in the history of modern Chinese science.

== See also ==
- Science (journal)
- Academia Sinica
- Chinese Academy of Sciences
- Former site of the Science Society of China and Mingfu Library
- History of science and technology in the People's Republic of China
- History of science and technology in China
