= Poropuntius opisthopterus =

Conservation status
- Data Deficient (IUCN 3.1)

Scientific classification
- Kingdom: Animalia
- Phylum: Chordata
- Class: Actinopterygii
- Order: Cypriniformes
- Family: Cyprinidae
- Genus: Poropuntius
- Species: P. opisthopterus

Binomial name
- Poropuntius opisthopterus (H. W. Wu, 1977)

Synonyms
- Barbodes opisthoptera Wu, 1977

Species of fish

Poropuntius opisthopterus is a species of ray-finned fish in the genus Poropuntius which has been recorded from a single locality in the drainage of the Salween (known as the Nujiang in China) in Yunnan. This species may be threatened by the building of dams.
