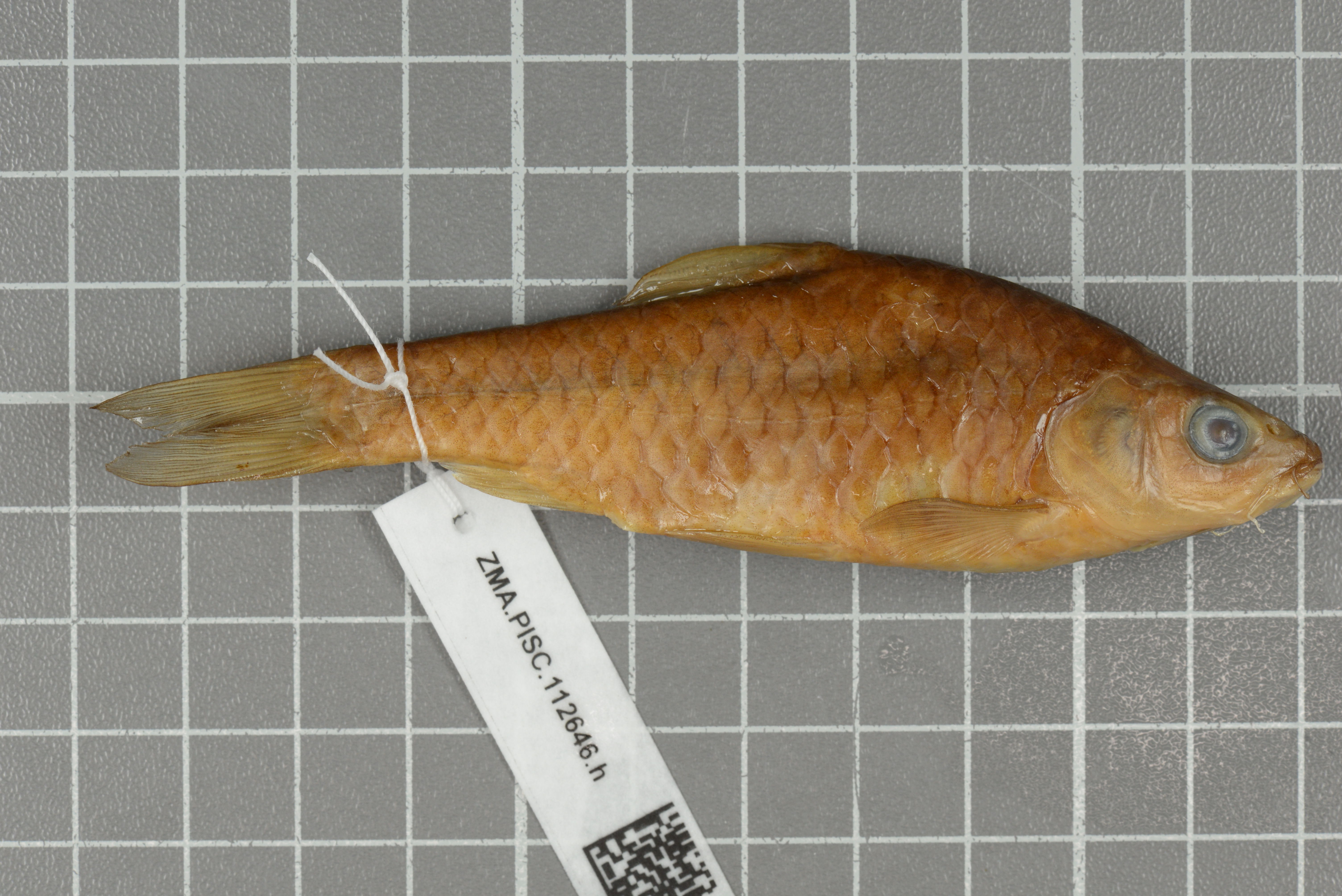

Conservation status
- Critically Endangered (IUCN 3.1)

Scientific classification
- Kingdom: Animalia
- Phylum: Chordata
- Class: Actinopterygii
- Order: Cypriniformes
- Family: Cyprinidae
- Genus: Poropuntius
- Species: P. tawarensis

Binomial name
- Poropuntius tawarensis (M. C. W. Weber & de Beaufort, 1916)

Synonyms
- Puntius tawarensis Weber & de Beaufort, 1916

= Poropuntius tawarensis =

Species of fish

Poropuntius tawarensis is a species of cyprinid fish. It endemic to Lake Tawar in Aceh Province, northern Sumatra, Indonesia.
