= Poropuntius laoensis =

Conservation status
- Least Concern (IUCN 3.1)

Scientific classification
- Kingdom: Animalia
- Phylum: Chordata
- Class: Actinopterygii
- Order: Cypriniformes
- Family: Cyprinidae
- Genus: Poropuntius
- Species: P. laoensis

Binomial name
- Poropuntius laoensis (Günther, 1868)

Synonyms
- Barbus laoensis Günther, 1868; Barbus bantamensis Rendahl, 1920; Acrossocheilus bantamensis (Rendahl, 1920); Poropuntius bantamensis (Rendahl, 1920); Lissochilus aluoiensis H. D. Nguyen, 1997

Species of fish

Poropuntius laoensis is a species of ray-finned fish in the genus Poropuntius from the Mekong in Myanmar, Thailand, Laos and Vietnam. It is found in clear forested streams and is not found in large rivers. Id does not persist in impoundments and is not known to migrate. It feeds mainly on insect larvae.
