= Poropuntius shanensis =

Conservation status
- Data Deficient (IUCN 3.1)

Scientific classification
- Kingdom: Animalia
- Phylum: Chordata
- Class: Actinopterygii
- Order: Cypriniformes
- Family: Cyprinidae
- Genus: Poropuntius
- Species: P. shanensis

Binomial name
- Poropuntius shanensis (Hora & Mukerji, 1934)

Synonyms
- Barbodes shanensis (Hora & Mukerji, 1934); Barbus shanensis Hora & Mukerji, 1934; Puntius shanensis (Hora & Mukerji 1934)

Species of fish

Poropuntius shanensis is a species of ray-finned fish in the genus Poropuntius which is found in rivers, streams, and possibly in swampy areas in Myanmar where it is found in Inle Lake and in Hsipaw. It has also been recorded from the drainage of the Salween in Yunnan. It can be found in local markets and is fished for by subsistence fisheries.
