= Poropuntius kontumensis =

Conservation status
- Data Deficient (IUCN 3.1)

Scientific classification
- Kingdom: Animalia
- Phylum: Chordata
- Class: Actinopterygii
- Order: Cypriniformes
- Family: Cyprinidae
- Genus: Poropuntius
- Species: P. kontumensis

Binomial name
- Poropuntius kontumensis (Chevey, 1934)

Synonyms
- Cyclocheilichthys kontumensis Chevey, 1934; Poropuntius kontumensis rasorius T. R. Roberts, 1998; Acrossocheilus yalyensis V. H. Nguyễn, 2002

Species of fish

Poropuntius kontumensis is a species of ray-finned fish in the genus Poropuntius. This species is native to Cambodia and Viet Nam. Its species named after Kontum.
