= Poropuntius faucis =

Conservation status
- Least Concern (IUCN 3.1)

Scientific classification
- Kingdom: Animalia
- Phylum: Chordata
- Class: Actinopterygii
- Order: Cypriniformes
- Family: Cyprinidae
- Genus: Poropuntius
- Species: P. faucis

Binomial name
- Poropuntius faucis (H. M. Smith, 1945)

Synonyms
- Puntius faucis Smith, 1945

Species of fish

Poropuntius faucis is a species of ray-finned fish in the genus Poropuntius which occurs in hill streams in the upper Chao Phraya basin in northern Thailand.
