= Zhou Ren =

Chinese materials engineer and metallurgist

- 周仁
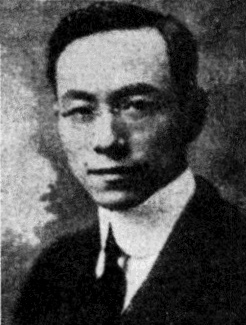
- Zhou Ren
- Born: August 5, 1892; Jiangning County, Jiangsu, Qing China
- Died: December 3, 1973 (aged 81); Shanghai, China
- Education: Cornell University
- Spouse: Nie Qibi
- Scientific career
- Fields: Metallurgy; Ceramics
- Workplaces: Academia Sinica; Chinese Academy of Sciences

Chinese name
- Chinese: 周仁
Transcriptions
Standard Mandarin
- Hanyu Pinyin: Zhōu Rén

Zijing
- Chinese: 子兢
Transcriptions
Standard Mandarin
- Hanyu Pinyin: Zǐjīng

Zhou Ren (Chinese: 周仁; pinyin: Zhōu Rén; 5 August 1892–3 December 1973) was a Chinese materials engineer and metallurgist. He was an educator and one of the founders of the Science Society of China, a major science organization in the 20th century before the establishment of the Communist State.

He was an academician of the Academia Sinica and the Chinese Academy of Sciences. He was also a delegate to the 1st, 2nd and 3rd National People's Congress.

== Biography ==
=== Early life and education ===
Zhou was born in Jiangning County, Jiangsu, on August 5, 1892. After graduating from the Jiangnan Higher School, he arrived in the United States in 1910 at the age of 18 to begin his education at Cornell University in Ithaca, New York.

=== Republic of China ===
He returned to China after graduation and worked as an engineer in a construction company under the recommendation of Shi Liangcai, the chief editor of Shen Bao. He was a professor of Nanjing Higher Normal School from 1917 to 1979. In 1919 he was hired as the chief engineer of Sichuan Steelmaking Plant, serving until 1921. In 1922, he moved to Shanghai as dean of National Chiao Tung University, he remained there until 1927. After a short period (1927–1928) of teaching students at National Central University, he went to the Academia Sinica, where he served as director of Institute of Engineering. Zhou was elected a fellow of the Academia Sinica in 1948.

=== People's Republic of China ===
Zhou remained in China after the defeat of the Nationalists over the Communists in the Chinese Civil War. After the founding of the Communist State, Zhou successively served as president of Laboratory of Engineering Experiment of Chinese Academy of Sciences (CAS), Institute of Metallurgy and Ceramics of CAS, Shanghai Metallurgy Institute, Shanghai Institute of Silicate Chemistry and Engineering, and Shanghai University of Science and Technology. He became an academician of the Chinese Academy of Sciences in 1955.

In 1966, Mao Zedong launched the ten-year Cultural Revolution, Zhou suffered political persecution in the massive socialist movement, the Red Guards searched his house and confiscated his property. They put Zhou in isolation and under investigation, where he was mistreated and tortured. Zhou died on December 3, 1973, aged 82.

== Personal life ==
Zhou married Nie Qibi (聂其璧; 1901–1990), the youngest daughter of Nie Jigui (聂辑椝; 1855–1911), an official and the son-in-law of Qing dynasty statesman, military general, and Confucian scholar Zeng Guofan (1811–1872). The couple had two sons and a daughter.

Zhou's elder sister Zhou Jun (周峻) was the third wife of Cai Yuanpei, an exceptional educator, esperantist, president of Peking University, and founder of the Academia Sinica.
