= Poropuntius hampaloides =

Conservation status
- Data Deficient (IUCN 3.1)

Scientific classification
- Kingdom: Animalia
- Phylum: Chordata
- Class: Actinopterygii
- Order: Cypriniformes
- Family: Cyprinidae
- Genus: Poropuntius
- Species: P. hampaloides

Binomial name
- Poropuntius hampaloides (Vinciguerra, 1890)

Synonyms
- Barbus hampaloides Vinciguerra, 1890; Poropuntius scapanognathus T. R. Roberts, 1998

Species of fish

Poropuntius hampaloides is a species of ray-finned fish in the genus Poropuntius which is found in the Salween drainage of southern Myanmar.
