= Poropuntius margarianus =

Conservation status
- Data Deficient (IUCN 3.1)

Scientific classification
- Kingdom: Animalia
- Phylum: Chordata
- Class: Actinopterygii
- Order: Cypriniformes
- Family: Cyprinidae
- Genus: Poropuntius
- Species: P. margarianus

Binomial name
- Poropuntius margarianus (J. Anderson, 1879)

Synonyms
- Barbus margarianus Anderson, 1879; Barbodes margarianus (Anderson, 1879)

Species of fish

Poropuntius margarianus is a species of ray-finned fish in the genus Poropuntius which is found in an eastern tributary of the Irrawaddy River in Yunnan and Myanmar.
