= Poropuntius genyognathus =

Conservation status
- Least Concern (IUCN 3.1)

Scientific classification
- Kingdom: Animalia
- Phylum: Chordata
- Class: Actinopterygii
- Order: Cypriniformes
- Family: Cyprinidae
- Genus: Poropuntius
- Species: P. genyognathus

Binomial name
- Poropuntius genyognathus T. R. Roberts, 1998

Species of fish

Poropuntius genyognathus is a species of ray-finned fish in the genus Poropuntius from the lower Salween and Tenasserim river drainages in southeastern Myanmar and from Peninsular Thailand.
