= Poropuntius anlaoensis =

Scientific classification
- Kingdom: Animalia
- Phylum: Chordata
- Class: Actinopterygii
- Order: Cypriniformes
- Family: Cyprinidae
- Genus: Poropuntius
- Species: P. anlaoensis

Binomial name
- Poropuntius anlaoensis Hoàng, Phạm & Trần, 2024

Species of fish

Poropuntius anlaoensis, the Anlao brook barb, is a species of freshwater ray-finned fish belonging to the family Cyprinidae, the family which includes the carp, barbs, minnows and related fishes. This species was first formally described in 2024 from the southern Annam ecoregion of Viet Nam and it may be endemic to the coastal slopes of the Annamite Cordillera.
