= Fan Yuanlian =

Chinese educator (1875–1927)

- 范源濂
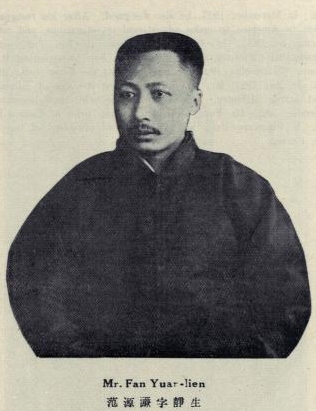
- Fan Yuanlian

President of Beijing Normal University
- In office July 1923 – September 1924
- Preceded by: Li Jianxun
- Succeeded by: Zhang Yihui

Minister of Education
- In office August 1920 – December 1921
- Preceded by: Fu Yuefen
- Succeeded by: Ma Linyi (Acting)
- In office July 1915 – November 1917
- Preceded by: Wu Kaisheng (Acting)
- Succeeded by: Yuan Xitao (Acting)
- In office July 1912 – July 1913
- Preceded by: Cai Yuanpei
- Succeeded by: Liu Guanxiong

Minister of Internal Affairs
- In office January 1917 – July 1917

President of Tsinghua University
- In office January 1918 – April 1918
- Preceded by: Zhao Guocai
- Succeeded by: Zhang Yuquan

Personal details
- Born: 1875 Xiangyin County, Hunan, Qing Empire
- Died: 1927 (aged 51–52) Tianjin, Republic of China
- Party: Kuomintang
- Relations: Fan Xudong (brother)
- Education: Tokyo Normal College; Hosei University

Fan Yuanlian (Chinese: 范源濂; pinyin: Fàn Yuánlián; Wade–Giles: Fan Yuan-lien; 1875 – 23 December 1927), courtesy name Jingsheng (Chinese: 靜生), was a Chinese educator and politician who served three separate terms as minister of Education of the Republic of China, from July 1912 to July 1913 and from July 1915 to November 1917, and briefly from August 1920 to December 1921. He also served as president of Tsinghua University from January 1918 to April 1918 and president of Beijing Normal University between July 1923 and September 1924. He was the founding father of Nankai University.

== Biography ==
Fan was born in Xiangyin County, Hunan in 1875, during the late Qing dynasty. He had a younger brother named Fan Xudong (Chinese: 范旭東; 1883–1945). He attended the Qingquan School (Chinese: 清泉學校). After graduating from the School of Current Affairs (Chinese: 時務學堂) in Changsha in 1898, he moved to Japan to commence graduate studies, where he studied at Datong School (Chinese: 大同學校), Tokyo Normal College, Hongwen Academy, and Hosei University. During this period he befriended Yang Du.

Fan returned China in 1904 and one year later he founded Tsinghua School with other educators in Beijing. He established the Zhibian School (Chinese: 殖邊學校) in Beijing in 1909 with friends like Liang Qichao and Zhang Dongsun. It offered free classes and was capable of issuing diplomas.

After establishment of the Republic of China in 1912, he was appointed vice-minister of Education in Tang Shaoyi's cabinet. In July of that same year, he succeeded Zhao Bingjun as the minister. He resigned in July 1913 and relocated to Shanghai as chief editor of Zhong Hua Book Company.

In the winner of 1915, he participated in the Anti-Yuan Shikai Movement. In July, he was named vice-minister of Education in Duan Qirui's cabinet. He put Cai Yuanpei forward as president of Tsinghua University. Fan concurrently served as minister of Internal Affairs between January 1917 and July 1917. In 1917, he became a supporting member of the Science Society of China. In November 1917, he went to the United States on a countryside education investigation. In 1919 he founded Nankai University with Zhang Boling in Tianjin. In August 1920 he was appointed Ministry of Education, but having held the position for only three months. Then he went to the United States again and did a countryside education investigation. In July 1923, Beijing National Higher Normal School was renamed Beijing Normal University, Fan was unanimously chosen as its first president.

On 23 December 1927, he died of illness in Tianjin. Senior members of the Science Society commemorated him in the name of the Fan Memorial Institute of Biology, which established the Bulletin of the Fan Memorial Institute of Biology.
