= Poropuntius schanicus =

Conservation status
- Data Deficient (IUCN 3.1)

Scientific classification
- Kingdom: Animalia
- Phylum: Chordata
- Class: Actinopterygii
- Order: Cypriniformes
- Family: Cyprinidae
- Genus: Poropuntius
- Species: P. schanicus

Binomial name
- Poropuntius schanicus (Boulenger, 1893)

Synonyms
- Puntius schanicus Boulenger, 1893

Species of fish

Poropuntius schanicus is a species of ray-finned fish in the genus Poropuntius. It is found in Salween Basin.
