= Hua Luogeng Park =

Park in Jintan, Jiangsu, China

Coordinates: 31°44′29″N 119°34′38″E

Hua Luogeng Park (Chinese: 华罗庚公园) is a park in the center of Jintan city, Jiangsu province, China, which was built in 1911 during the Qing dynasty, originally as the private Yayue Garden. It is named after the mathematician Hua Luogeng. The park covers approximately five hectares and has three gates. Access to the park is free.

== Names ==
The park has had several names over the years. In 1928, to commemorate the third anniversary of the death of Sun Yat-sen (Sun Zhongshan), the park was renamed Zhongshan Park. During the Cultural Revolution, the park was renamed People's Park.

== Features ==
The park has a large sculpture of Hua near the entrance in an open space. It was built in 1986, a year after Hua's death. Hua is revered as the "pride of Jintan".

A big clock was built at the turn of the century, representing a new beginning of a new century. There is a river with a small pavilion in the centre. A restored section of the old city wall is located in the park. In the west side of the park, there is a pool with a fountain, lined with sculptures.
