= Xiong Qinglai =

Chinese mathematician (1893–1969)

- 熊庆来
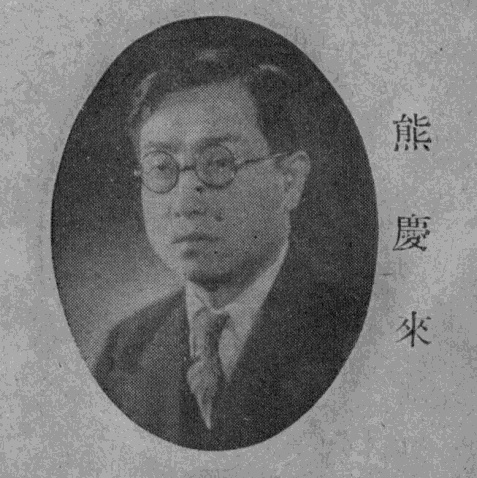
- Born: October 20, 1893; Mile County, Yunnan
- Died: February 3, 1969 (aged 75)

Xiong Qinglai, or Hiong King-Lai (simplified Chinese: 熊庆来; traditional Chinese: 熊慶來; pinyin: Xióng Qìnglái; Wade–Giles: Hsiung Ch'ing-lai, October 20, 1893 – February 3, 1969), courtesy name Dizhi (迪之), was a Chinese mathematician from Yunnan. He was the first person to introduce modern mathematics into China, and served as an influential president of Yunnan University from 1937 through 1947. A Chinese stamp was issued in his honour.

== Biography ==
Xiong was born in Xizhai village (nowadays named Qinglai village to honour him) of Mile County, Yunnan province. He was the son of Xiong Guodong (熊国栋), a government official in Zhaozhou.

In 1907, Xiong accompanied his father to Kunming and enrolled in the Yunnan Higher School for preparatory studies. After two years, he began studying English and French. In 1911, he entered the Yunnan Provincial Institute of Higher Learning.

At the age of sixteen, Xiong Qinglai followed his parents' instructions and married Jiang Juyuan (b. 1893). The couple had 5 children.

In 1913, Xiong was successfully selected and funded by Yunnan provincial government to study mining in Belgium. However, following German invasion of Belgium in 1914, Xiong embarked on a journey to Paris, France where he enrolled at Lycée St Louis, focusing on mathematics. After completing his studies at Lycée St Louis in 1915, Xiong began his undergraduate studies at the University of Grenoble later that year. He then moved to Paris, where he continued his studies in mathematics, analytical mechanics, physics, and astronomy at the Faculty of Science in Paris (Faculté des sciences de Paris). He further pursued his education at the University of Montpellier and the University of Marseille. In 1920, Xiong was awarded a Master of Science degree by the University of Montpellier.

In the spring of 1921, Xiong first returned to Kunming, China, where he took up teaching positions at the Kunming Yunnan Industrial School and the Yunnan Road School. Xiong then relocated to Nanjing in September 1921, upon acceptance of Kuo Ping-Wen' s invitation to establish a Department of Mathematics at the National Southeastern University (Later renamed National Central University and Nanjing University). During his tenure as professor of mathematics at the National Southeastern University, Xiong wrote more than ten textbooks on geometry, calculus, differential equations, mechanics, etc. It was the first endeavor in history to introduce modern mathematics in Chinese textbooks.

In the autumn of 1925, Xiong Qinglai briefly taught at Northwestern University for one semester before returning to Southeast University in the following spring. In the autumn of 1926, he received an invitation from Cao Yunxiang and Ye Qisun to join the mathematics department at Tsinghua University as a professor, teaching advanced courses in calculus, differential equations, and analytical functions. Xiong became the head of the Department of Mathematics in 1928 and later the Dean of Science in 1930, replacing Ye Qisun.

During this time, after reading Hua Luogeng's paper in the Shanghai Journal of Science, Xiong invited him to join Tsinghua University as an assistant in the library and meanwhile studying undergraduate courses. Xiong influenced the path of Hua Luogeng, who later became another prominent mathematician.

In September 1932, Xiong attended the International Congress of Mathematicians in Zurich, Switzerland. He then travelled to Paris for a year of research and published two papers in 1933: "Sur les fonctions méromorphes dans le cercle-unite" and "Sur les fonctions méromorphes d'ordre infini." Xiong took a leave of absence from Tsinghua University for 2 years in pursuit of his research. In 1934, Xiong completed his main thesis Sur les fonctions entières et les fonctions méromorphes d'ordre infini and second thesis La théorie de Lebesgue et ses applications fondamentales. The theses were examined by Émile Borel (President), Arnaud Denjoy and Georges Valiron and approved in June 1934.

Returning to Beijing in 1934, Xiong continued his role as a professor and head of the Department of Mathematics at Tsinghua University. In July 1935, he became one of the founders of the Chinese Mathematical Society in Shanghai and served as a member of its first board of directors.

In 1937, Xiong took up the role of President of Yunnan University in Kunming. Under his leadership, the university underwent significant improvements, expanding to five schools with 18 departments, along with special training courses and laboratories by 1939.

In March 1949, Xiong was instructed by the Department of Education to attend a UNESCO conference in Paris, after which he stayed in France to engage in mathematical research. In 1950, he published Sur une extension du second théorème fondamental de R Nevanlinna and Sur les fonctions méromorphes et leurs dérivées. However, in the same year, he suffered a cerebral haemorrhage that paralyzed the right side of his body.

Between 1953 and 1955, Xiong produced an impressive research output, publishing twelve papers. In 1957, Xiong published a book titled "Sur les fonctions méromorphes et les fonctions algébroïdes, extensions d'un théorème de M R Nevanlinna", upon Henri Villat' s kindly request.

Xiong declined Chen Lifu's offer to go to Taiwan. In 1956, Hua Loo-Keng conveyed an invitation from Premier Zhou Enlai for Xiong to return to the People's Republic of China. He accepted and returned to Beijing in June 1957. Upon returning to China, Xiong Qinglai worked at the Institute of Mathematics of the Chinese Academy of Sciences. Over the following eight years, he published over 20 papers and actively mentored graduate students and young scholars.

Xiong was labeled a "reactionary academic authority" during the period of Cultural Revolution and was persecuted to death in 1969, at the age of 76. He was rehabilitated in 1978.

On 20 November 1992, China Post issued a stamp commemorating Xiong Qinglai as part of the third set of its "Modern Chinese Scientists" stamp series (serial number 1992-19). 76 million copies were printed.
