= Poropuntius speleops =

Conservation status
- Vulnerable (IUCN 3.1)

Scientific classification
- Kingdom: Animalia
- Phylum: Chordata
- Class: Actinopterygii
- Order: Cypriniformes
- Family: Cyprinidae
- Genus: Poropuntius
- Species: P. speleops

Binomial name
- Poropuntius speleops (T. R. Roberts, 1991)

Synonyms
- Barbus speleops Roberts, 1991; Puntius speleops (Roberts, 1991)

Species of fish

Poropuntius speleops is a vulnerable species of ray-finned fish in the genus Poropuntius. It is found only in underground streams in a single cave in the Phu Khieo Wildlife Sanctuary in Thailand. Like other cavefish, it has reduced pigmentation and eyes. It is threatened by poaching for food and the aquarium trade, although the population is stable.
