= Hua's lemma =

Mathematical estimate for exponential sums

In mathematics, Hua's lemma, named for Hua Loo-keng, is an estimate for exponential sums.

It states that if P is an integral-valued polynomial of degree k, $\varepsilon$ is a positive real number, and f a real function defined by

$$f(\alpha)=\sum_{x=1}^N\exp(2\pi iP(x)\alpha),$$

then

$$\int_0^1|f(\alpha)|^\lambda d\alpha\ll_{P, \varepsilon} N^{\mu(\lambda)}$$,

where $(\lambda,\mu(\lambda))$ lies on a polygonal line with vertices

$$(2^\nu,2^\nu-\nu+\varepsilon),\quad\nu=1,\ldots,k.$$
