= Poropuntius hathe =

Conservation status
- Data Deficient (IUCN 3.1)

Scientific classification
- Kingdom: Animalia
- Phylum: Chordata
- Class: Actinopterygii
- Order: Cypriniformes
- Family: Cyprinidae
- Genus: Poropuntius
- Species: P. hathe

Binomial name
- Poropuntius hathe T. R. Roberts, 1998

Species of fish

Poropuntius hathe is a species of ray-finned fish in the genus Poropuntius. It is a poorly known species and it is thought to be restricted to tributaries of the lower Salween basin in western Thailand and eastern Myanmar.
