= Stedman barb =

Conservation status
- Near Threatened (IUCN 3.1)

Scientific classification
- Kingdom: Animalia
- Phylum: Chordata
- Class: Actinopterygii
- Order: Cypriniformes
- Family: Cyprinidae
- Subfamily: Cyprininae
- Genus: Poropuntius
- Species: P. clavatus

Binomial name
- Poropuntius clavatus (McClelland, 1845)

Synonyms
- Barbus clavatus McClelland, 1845; Systomus clavatus McClelland, 1845; Poropuntius clavatus (McClelland, 1845); Puntius clavatus (McClelland, 1845); Puntius clavatus clavatus (McClelland, 1845); Barbus compressus Boulenger, 1893; Barbus liui Fowler, 1958

Species of fish

The Stedman barb (Poropuntius clavatus) is a species of cyprinid fish native to India and Bangladesh in the Ganges River basin where it occurs in foothill streams and rivers. This species can reach a length of 24 centimetres (9.4 in) TL. It is of minor importance to local commercial fisheries.
