= Erica Jen =

American applied mathematician

- Born: 1952
- Died: November 12, 2023 (aged 70–71)
- Citizenship: United States
- Education: Yale University; Beijing University
- Occupation: Applied Mathematician
- Years active: 1983 - 2023

Erica Jen (Chinese: 任峻瑞; Rén Jùnrùi; circa 1952 – November 12, 2023) was an American applied mathematician. She was a researcher at Los Alamos National Laboratory, a faculty member at the University of Southern California, and a scientific director and faculty member at the Santa Fe Institute.

Jen's research focused on the mathematical analysis of chaotic and complex behavior. Her research areas included singular integral equations for crack propagation, the mathematics of cellular automata (a class of dynamical systems that evolve according to simple local interaction rules), and mechanisms of robustness in natural and social systems.

== Early life and education ==
Jen was born in 1952 to Chih-Kung Jen, a Chinese-born physicist who played a leading role in reestablishing scientific exchanges between the U.S. and China in the 1970s. After her junior year at Yale University, Jen attended Beijing University for further education, becoming the first American national allowed to study in China since 1949 and the first foreigner since the Cultural Revolution.

After returning to the U.S., Jen obtained a Ph.D. in applied mathematics from Stony Brook University of the State University of New York and was the first postdoctoral fellow at the Center for Nonlinear Studies at Los Alamos National Laboratory.

== Career ==
Jen served as a university scholar and assistant professor of mathematics at the University of Southern California from 1983 to 1986. In 1986, she became a staff member in the theoretical division and acting deputy director of the Center for Nonlinear Studies at Los Alamos National Laboratory.

In 1995, Jen joined the Santa Fe Institute, a leading interdisciplinary research center for the study of complex adaptive systems. She initially served as vice president for academic affairs and later as a research professor. Jen was the principal investigator for programs in evolutionary dynamics, social networks, and distributed learning. During her time at the Santa Fe Institute, Jen developed the program on the robustness of physical, biological, ecological, and social systems. After 2003, Jen served as external faculty, a science board member, and a science board fellow at the Santa Fe Institute. Jen was also an editor of Physica D: Nonlinearity.

She died on November 12, 2023.

== Selected bibliography ==
- Daily Life: An Experience with Peking Youth in The China Difference (1979), Ross Terrill, ed., New York: Harper & Row
- D. Campbell, J. P. Crutchfield, J. D. Farmer, and E. Jen. Experimental Mathematics: The Role of Computation in Nonlinear Science. Comm. ACM 28 1985: 374
- 1989 Lectures on Complex Systems, Erica Jen (ed.), Santa Fe Institute Studies in the Sciences of Complexity, Addison-Wesley, 1989
- Global properties of cellular automata, J. Statistical Physics, vol 43, p 219-242 (1986).
- Scaling of preimages in cellular automata," Complex Systems 1 (1987) 1045-1062
- Exact solvability and quasiperiodicity in one-dimensional cellular automata," Nonlinearity 4 (1991), 251–276
- Stable or Robust? What's the Difference? Complexity 8(3): 12-18 (2003)
- Robust Design: A Repertoire of Biological, Ecological, and Engineering Case Studies, E. Jen (ed), Santa Fe Institute Studies on the Sciences of Complexity, Oxford University Press, 2005
