= Ting Pang-hsin =

Chinese linguist (1936–2023)

- 丁邦新
- Born: 28 November 1936; Ju-kao (Rugao) County, Kiangsu, Republic of China
- Died: 30 January 2023 (aged 86); California, United States

Academic background
- Education: National Taiwan University (BA, MA); University of Washington (PhD)

Academic work
- Discipline: Linguistics
- Institutions: Academia Sinica

Ting Pang-hsin (Chinese: 丁邦新; pinyin: Dīng Bāngxīn; 28 November 1936 – 30 January 2023) was a Chinese linguist, and an academician of the Academia Sinica.

== Biography ==
Ting was born in Ju-kao County (Rugao County), Kiangsu (Jiangsu), on 28 November 1936. After the defeat of the Kuomintang by the Chinese Communist Party in 1949, Ting relocated to Taiwan. He attended National Taiwan University, where he earned his bachelor's degree in 1959 and master's degree in 1963 both in Chinese literature. He went on to receive his doctoral degree from the University of Washington in 1969.

Ting worked at the Academia Sinica after university. He was elected assistant research fellow in August 1964, associate research fellow in February 1970, and research fellow in August 1975. In August 1981, he was named acting director of the Institute of History and Philology, confirmed in March 1985. He was a professor of National Taiwan University from 1975 to 1989 and the University of California, Berkeley from 1989 to 1998. During his tenure at Berkeley, Ting held the Agassiz Professorship of Chinese Linguistics from 1994. Ting was In 1996, he was chosen as dean of the School of Humanities and Social Sciences, Hong Kong University of Science and Technology, a post he kept until 2004.

Between 1993 and 1994, Ting replaced William Shi-Yuan Wang as president of the International Association of Chinese Linguistics. He was succeeded by Mei Tsu-lin.

Ting died in California on 30 January 2023, at the age of 86.

== Publications ==
- Chinese Phonology of the Wei-Chin Period: Reconstruction of the Finals as Reflected in Poetry. Taipei: Institute of History and Philology, Academia Sinica. 1975.
- Contemporary Studies on the Min Dialects. Journal of Chinese Linguistics. 1999.
- 魏晋音韵研究 [A Study of the Phonology of the Wei and Jin Dynasties] (in Chinese). Taiwan: Institute of History and Philology, Academia Sinica. 1975. ISBN 9780001289093.
- 儋州村话 [Dialect of Danzhou] (in Chinese). Taiwan: Institute of History and Philology, Academia Sinica. 1986. ISBN 9780001920125.
- 语言学论文集 [Collected Papers on Linguistics] (in Chinese). Beijing: Commercial Press. 1998. ISBN 9787100022392.
- 音韵学讲义 [Phonics Handout] (in Chinese). Beijing: Peking University Press. 2015. ISBN 9787301260876.
- 音韵学答问 [Phonics Q&A] (in Chinese). Beijing: Peking University Press. 2016. ISBN 9787301273388.
- 闽语研究及其与周边方言的关系 [The Study of Min dialect and Its Relationship with Surrounding Dialects] (in Chinese). Taiwan: Chinese University Press. 2002. ISBN 9789622019966.
- 一百年前的苏州话 [Suzhou Dialect a Hundred Years Ago] (in Chinese). Shanghai: Shanghai Education Press. 2003. ISBN 9787532085613.
- 汉语与汉藏语前沿研究 [Frontier Studies of Chinese and Sino-Tibetan] (in Chinese). Beijing: Social Science Literature Press. 2018. ISBN 9787520121132.
- 汉藏语同源词研究（一） [Research on Chinese and Tibetan Cognates (1)] (in Chinese). Nanning: Guangxi Ethnic Publishing House. 2000. ISBN 9787536338326.
- 汉藏语同源词研究（二） [Research on Chinese and Tibetan Cognates (2)] (in Chinese). Nanning: Guangxi Ethnic Publishing House. 2001. ISBN 9787536340343.
- 汉藏语同源词研究（三） [Research on Chinese and Tibetan Cognates (3)] (in Chinese). Nanning: Guangxi Ethnic Publishing House. 2004. ISBN 9787536347618.

== Honours and awards ==
- 1986 Member of the Academia Sinica
- 2000 Honorary Member of the Linguistic Society of America
