= Poropuntius fuxianhuensis =

Scientific classification
- Domain: Eukaryota
- Kingdom: Animalia
- Phylum: Chordata
- Class: Actinopterygii
- Order: Cypriniformes
- Family: Cyprinidae
- Genus: Poropuntius
- Species: P. fuxianhuensis

Binomial name
- Poropuntius fuxianhuensis (Y. H. Wang, D. D. Zhuang & L. C. Gao, 1982)

Synonyms
- Puntius fuxianhuensis Wang, Zhuang & Gao, 1982; Barbodes fuxianhuensis (Wang, Zhuang & Gao, 1982)

Species of fish

Poropuntius fuxianhuensis is a species of ray-finned fish in the genus Poropuntius.
