= Poropuntius heterolepidotus =

Conservation status
- Data Deficient (IUCN 3.1)

Scientific classification
- Kingdom: Animalia
- Phylum: Chordata
- Class: Actinopterygii
- Order: Cypriniformes
- Family: Cyprinidae
- Genus: Poropuntius
- Species: P. heterolepidotus

Binomial name
- Poropuntius heterolepidotus T. R. Roberts, 1998

Species of fish

Poropuntius heterolepidotus is a species of ray-finned fish in the genus Poropuntius. It is a little known species and it is restricted to smaller tributaries of the lower Salween basin in Thailand and Myanmar.
