= Poropuntius melanogrammus =

Conservation status
- Data Deficient (IUCN 3.1)

Scientific classification
- Kingdom: Animalia
- Phylum: Chordata
- Class: Actinopterygii
- Order: Cypriniformes
- Family: Cyprinidae
- Genus: Poropuntius
- Species: P. melanogrammus

Binomial name
- Poropuntius melanogrammus T. R. Roberts, 1998

Species of fish

Poropuntius melanogrammus is a species of ray-finned fish in the genus Poropuntius from the drainage of the Maeklong and nearby regions of western Thailand.
