= Poropuntius burtoni =

Conservation status
- Least Concern (IUCN 3.1)

Scientific classification
- Kingdom: Animalia
- Phylum: Chordata
- Class: Actinopterygii
- Order: Cypriniformes
- Family: Cyprinidae
- Genus: Poropuntius
- Species: P. burtoni

Binomial name
- Poropuntius burtoni (Mukerji, 1933)

Synonyms
- Acrossocheilus manipurensis Datta, Karmakar & Laishram, 1984

Species of fish

Poropuntius burtoni is a species of ray-finned fish in the genus Poropuntius which is common in most of the hils treams draining into the Chindwin river in Manipur.
