= Mei Tsu-lin =

Chinese-American linguist (1933–2023)

Mei Tsu-lin (Chinese: 梅祖麟; 14 February 1933 – 14 October 2023) was a Chinese-American linguist.

== Life and career ==
Mei was born in Beijing on 14 February 1933, and immigrated to the United States in 1949, during the Chinese Civil War. He earned a bachelor's degree in mathematics from Oberlin College in 1954, and completed a master's degree in the same subject at Harvard University two years later, then obtained a doctorate in philosophy from Yale University in 1962. Mei taught at Yale and held an assistant and associate professorship at Harvard before joining the Cornell University faculty in 1972. From 1994 to 2001, Mei held Cornell's Hu Shih Chair Professorship.

Mei was elected to Taiwan's Academia Sinica in 1994 and served as president of the International Association of Chinese Linguistics that same year, succeeding Ting Pang-hsin. Mei was a founding board member of the Li Fang-Kuei Society for Chinese Linguistics from 2003 to 2014, and also a member of the Taiwan-based Association of Chinese Phonology.

Mei Tsu-lin's parents were Mei Yi-pao and Nyi Vong-kyih, and his uncle was Mei Yi-chi. Mei Tsu-lin was married twice. During his marriage to Chen Yu-shih, Mei had two daughters and a son. His later marriage to Teresa spanned five decades. Mei died at the Cayuga Medical Center on 14 October 2023, at the age of 90.
