= Yang Xingfo =

Chinese scholar and activist

- 楊杏佛
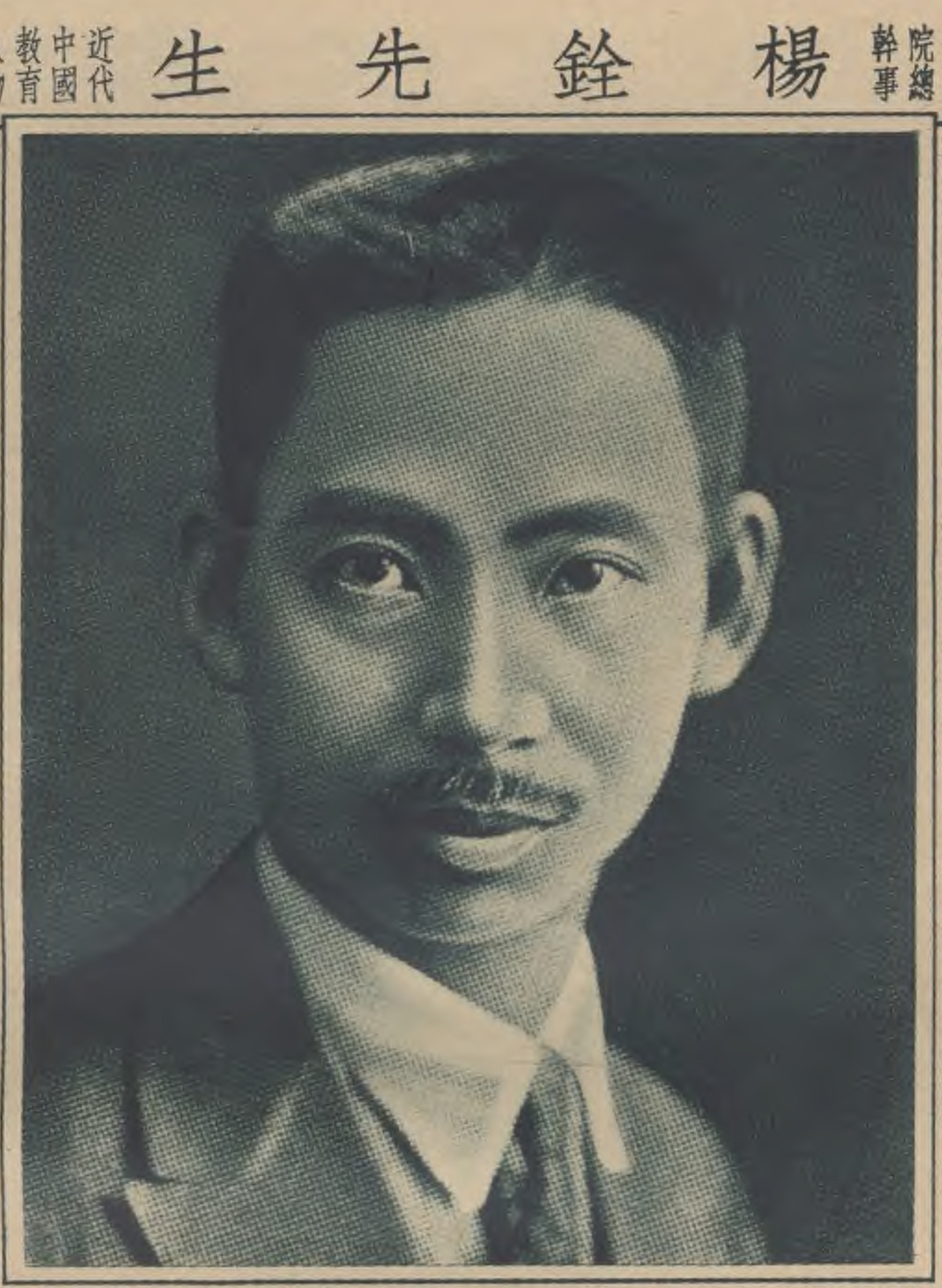
- Born: 4 May 1893; Zhangshu, Jiangxi, Qing China
- Died: June 18, 1933 (aged 40); French Concession, Shanghai, Republic of China
- Burial place: Shanghai International Cemetery
- Education: China Public University; Imperial Chinese Railway College; Cornell University (BS); Harvard University (MBA)
- Children: 1

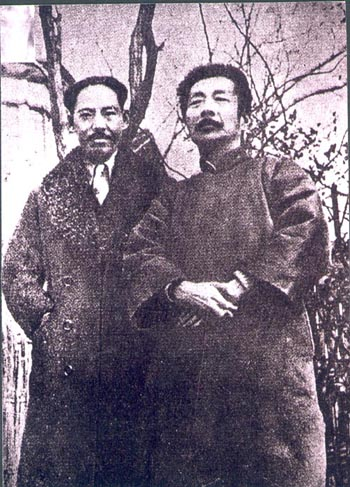
Yang Xingfo (left) with Lu Xun

Yang Xingfo, also spelt Yang Hsingfo (楊杏佛) and otherwise known as Yang Chu'en (楊銓)(May 4, 1893 - June 18, 1933) was a Chinese management scholar and activist. He was professor at National Central University in Nanjing (then known as Nanking) and co-founded the Science Society of China while studying at Cornell University.

== See also ==
- List of Chinese pro-democracy activists
