= Zhao Guocai =

Chinese diplomat

- 赵国材
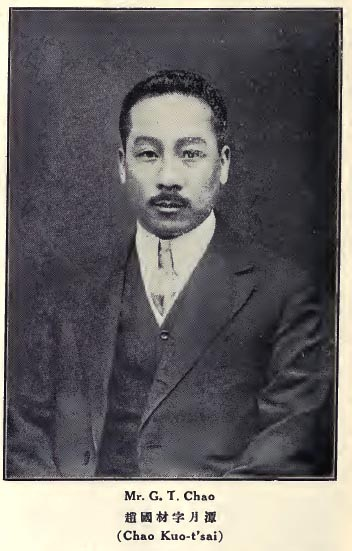
- Zhao Guocai

President of Tsinghua University (Acting)
- In office 1918–1918
- Preceded by: Zhou Yichun
- Succeeded by: Zhang Yuquan

President of Tsinghua University (Acting)
- In office 1913–1913
- Preceded by: Tang Guo'an
- Succeeded by: Zhou Yichun

Personal details
- Born: 1879 Shanghai, Qing Empire
- Died: 1966 (aged 86–87) Shanghai, China
- Party: Chinese Communist Party
- Education: St. John's University, Shanghai; Cornell University; University of Wisconsin System

Zhao Guocai (simplified Chinese: 赵国材; traditional Chinese: 趙國材; pinyin: Zhào Guócái; Wade–Giles: Chao Kuo-ts'ai; 1879–1966) was a Chinese educator and diplomat.

== Biography ==
Zhao was born in Shanghai in 1879. In 1906 he graduated from St. John's University, Shanghai. Zhao was sent abroad to study at the expense of the Qing dynasty. He studied politics at Cornell University and the University of Wisconsin. He returned to China in 1913 and that year became vice-president of Tsinghua University, after the President Tang Guo'an left, he acted as the acting president. In 1920, he was director of China's educational mission in Washington.

In 1966, Mao Zedong launched the Cultural Revolution, Zhao was mistreated and tortured by the Red Guards.

Educational offices
Preceded by Tang Guo'an (唐国安)	President of Tsinghua University (Acting); 1913–1913	Succeeded by Zhou Yichun (周诒春)
Preceded by Zhou Yichun (周诒春)	President of Tsinghua University (Acting); 1918–1918	Succeeded by Zhang Yuquan (张煜全)
