= Wu Youxun =

Chinese physicist

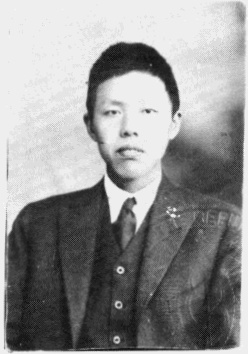
- Wu in 1921
- Born: 26 April 1897; Gao'an, Jiangxi, Qing dynasty
- Died: 30 November 1977 (aged 80); Beijing, China
- Education: University of Chicago
- Known for: Physics
- Scientific career
- Workplaces: Tsinghua University; National Central University
- Academic advisors: Arthur Compton

Wu Youxun (simplified Chinese: 吴有训; traditional Chinese: 吳有訓; pinyin: Wú Yǒuxùn; Wade–Giles: Wu Yu-hsun; 26 April 1897 – 30 November 1977), also known as Y. H. Woo, was a Chinese physicist. His courtesy name was Zhèngzhī (正之).

== Biography ==
Wu graduated from the Department of Physics of Nanjing Higher Normal School (later renamed National Central University and Nanjing University), and was later associated with the Department of Physics at Tsinghua University. He served as president of National Central University and Jiaotong University in Shanghai. When he was a graduate student at the University of Chicago he studied x-ray and electron scattering, and verified the Compton effect which gave Arthur Compton the Nobel Prize in Physics.

== Awards ==
In 2000, the Chinese Physical Society established five prizes, in recognition of five pioneers of modern physics in China. The Wu Youxun Prize is awarded to physicists in nuclear physics.
