= Science Pictorial =

Chinese science magazine

- Type: Popular science magazine
- Founded: August 1, 1933
- ISSN: 1000-8292
- OCLC number: 916799113
- Website: www.kxhb.com

Science Pictorial
- Traditional Chinese: 科學畫報
- Simplified Chinese: 科学画报
Transcriptions
Standard Mandarin
- Hanyu Pinyin: Kēxué huàbào

The Science Pictorial (simplified Chinese: 科学画报; traditional Chinese: 科學畫報; pinyin: Kēxué huàbào), or Scientific Pictorial, Popular Science, Popular Science Monthly, is a Chinese popular science magazine launched by Chinese Science Society on August 1, 1933 and based in Shanghai. The ISSN number of the publication is ISSN 1000-8292.

Science Pictorial was the first comprehensive popular science magazine in China, and the only pictorial that continued to be published after the establishment of the People's Republic of China and still exists today.

Science Pictorial is now published monthly and distributed by Shanghai Science and Technology Press. It made science more accessible to the less educated readers and made a major contribution to the popularization of science in China.
