= Hua Luogeng =

Chinese mathematician and politician (1910–1985)

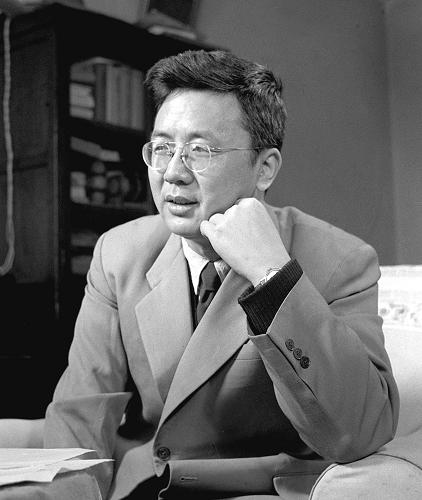
- Hua Luogeng in 1956
- Born: 12 November 1910; Jintan, Jiangsu, China
- Died: 12 June 1985 (aged 74); Tokyo, Japan
- Known for: Hua's inequality Brauer–Cartan–Hua theorem Hua's lemma Hua's identity Hua's identity (Jordan algebra)
- Office: Vice Chairperson of the Chinese People's Political Consultative Conference
- Political party: Chinese Communist Party

Academic background
- Education: six years of primary school and three years of secondary school

Academic work
- Discipline: Mathematics
- Doctoral students: Chen Jingrun; Pan Chengdong; Wang Yuan

Chinese name
- Simplified Chinese: 华罗庚
- Traditional Chinese: 華羅庚
Transcriptions
Standard Mandarin
- Hanyu Pinyin: Huà Luógēng
- Gwoyeu Romatzyh: Huah Luogeng
- Wade–Giles: Hua^{4} Lo^{2}-Keng^{1}
- IPA: [xwâ lwǒkə́ŋ]

Hua Luogeng or Hua Loo-Keng (Chinese: 华罗庚; Wade–Giles: Hua Lo-keng; 12 November 1910 – 12 June 1985) was a Chinese mathematician and politician famous for his contributions to number theory and for his role as the leader of mathematics research and education in the People's Republic of China. He was largely responsible for identifying and nurturing the mathematician Chen Jingrun, who proved Chen's theorem, the best-known result on the Goldbach conjecture. Hua's later work on mathematical optimization and operations research made an enormous impact on China's economy. He was elected a foreign associate of the US National Academy of Sciences in 1982. He was elected a member of the Standing Committee of the 1st through 6th National People's Congresses, Vice-Chairman of the 6th National Committee of the Chinese People's Political Consultative Conference (April 1985) and vice-chairman of the China Democratic League (1979). He joined the Chinese Communist Party in 1979.

Hua did not receive a formal university education. Although awarded several honorary PhDs, he never got a formal degree from any university. In fact, his formal education only consisted of six years of primary school and three years of secondary school. For that reason, Xiong Qinglai, after reading one of Hua's early papers, was amazed by his mathematical talent, and in 1931 invited him to study mathematics at Tsinghua University.

== Biography ==
=== Early years (1910–1936) ===
Hua Luogeng was born in Jintan on 12 November 1910. Hua's father was a small businessman. Hua met a capable math teacher in middle school who recognized his talent early and encouraged him to read advanced texts. After middle school, Hua enrolled in Chinese Vocational College in Shanghai, and there he distinguished himself by winning a national abacus competition. Although tuition fees at the college were low, living costs proved too high for his means, and Hua was forced to leave a term before graduating. After failing to find a job in Shanghai, Hua returned home in 1927 to help in his father's store. In 1929, Hua contracted typhoid fever and was in bed for half a year. The culmination of Hua's illness resulted in the partial paralysis of his left leg, which impeded his movement quite severely for the rest of his life.

After middle school, Hua continued to study mathematics independently with the few books he had, and studied the entire high school and early undergraduate math curriculum. By the time Hua returned to Jintan, he was already engaged in independent mathematics research, and his first publication Some Researches on the Theorem of Sturm, appeared in the December 1929 issue of the Shanghai periodical Science. In the following year Hua showed in a short note in the same journal that a certain 1926 paper claiming to have solved the quintic was fundamentally flawed. Hua's lucid analysis caught the eye of Prof. Xiong Qinglai at Tsinghua University in Beijing, and in 1931 Hua was invited, despite his lack of formal qualification and not without some reservations on the part of several faculty members, to join the mathematics department there.

At Tsinghua, Hua began as a clerk in the library, and then moved to become an assistant in mathematics. By September 1932, he was an instructor, and two years later, after having published another dozen papers, he was promoted to the rank of lecturer.

During 1935–36 Jacques Hadamard and Norbert Wiener visited Tsinghua, and Hua eagerly attended the lectures of both and created a good impression. Wiener visited England soon afterward and spoke of Hua to G. H. Hardy. In this way Hua received an invitation to Cambridge, England, where he stayed for two years.

=== Early middle years (1936–1950) ===
At Cambridge University, Hua worked on applying the Hardy–Littlewood circle method to problems in number theory. He produced seminal work on Waring's problem, which established his reputation in the international math community. In 1938, after the full outbreak of the Second Sino-Japanese War, Hua returned to China to Tsinghua, where he was appointed full professor despite having no degree. At the time, with vast areas of China under Japanese occupation, Tsinghua University, Peking University, and Nankai University had merged into the Southwest Associated University in Kunming, capital of the southern province Yunnan. In spite of the hardships of poverty, enemy bombings, and relative academic isolation from the rest of the world, Hua continued to produce first-rate mathematics. During his eight years there, Hua studied Vinogradov's seminal method of estimating trigonometric sums and reformulated it in sharper form, in what is now known universally as Vinogradov's mean value theorem. This result is central to improved versions of the Hilbert–Waring theorem, and has important applications to the study of the Riemann zeta function. Hua wrote up this work in his booklet Additive Theory of Prime Numbers, which was accepted for publication in Russia as early as 1940, but, owing to the war, did not appear in expanded form until 1947 as a monograph of the Steklov Institute. In the closing years of the Kunming period, Hua turned to algebra and analysis, to which he soon began to make original contributions.

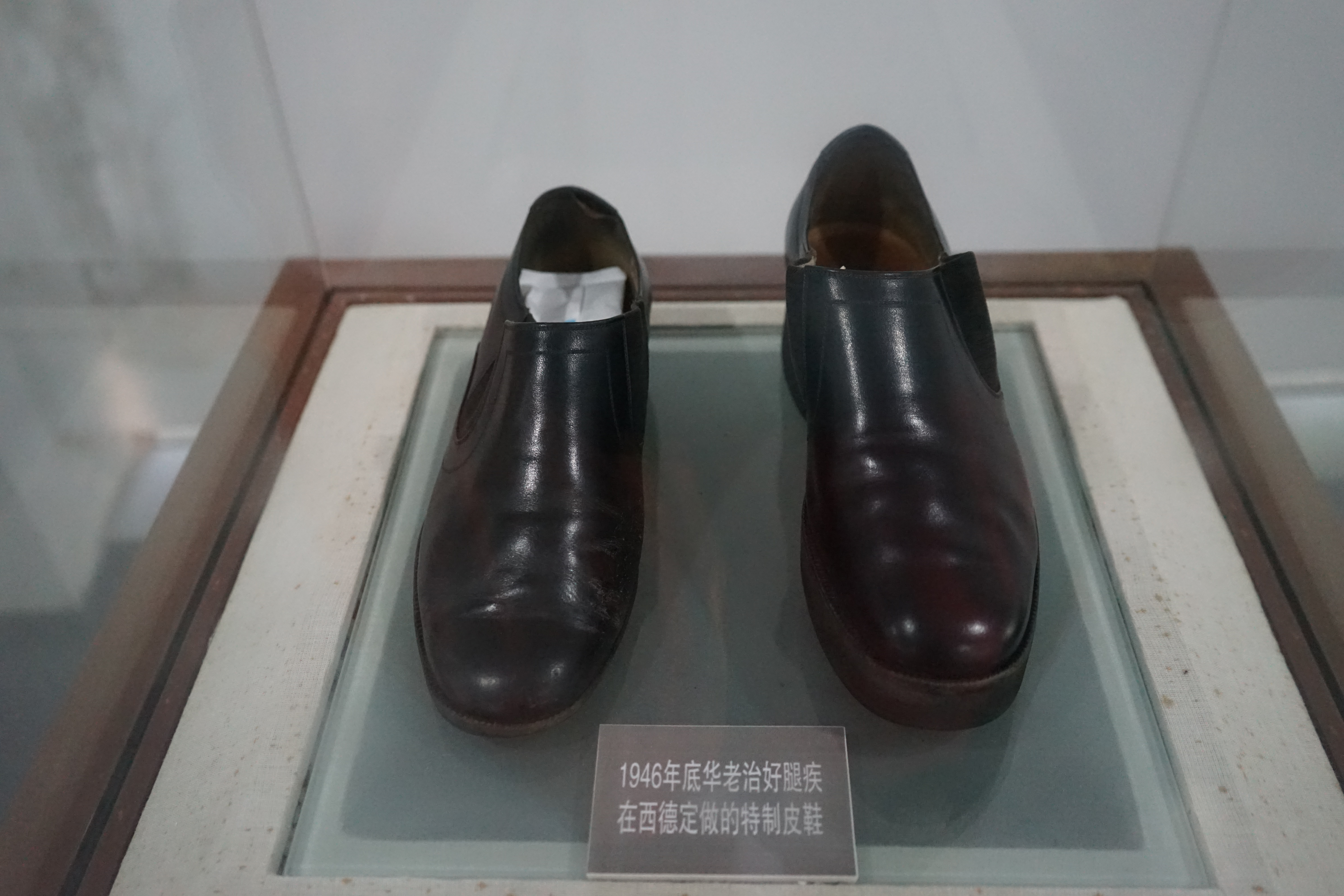
Custom-made shoes Hua Luogeng bought in West Germany in 1946 after his leg problems were cured.

After the war, Hua spent three months in the Soviet Union in the spring of 1946, at Ivan Vinogradov's invitation, after which he departed for the Institute for Advanced Study in Princeton, New Jersey. There, Hua worked on matrix theory, functions of several complex variables, and group theory. At this time civil war was raging in China and it was not easy to travel, and for "convenience of travel," the Chinese authorities assigned Hua the rank of general in his passport.

In the spring of 1948, Hua accepted appointment as full professor at the University of Illinois Urbana–Champaign, but his stay in Illinois was brief. In October 1949, the People's Republic of China was established, and Hua, wanting to be part of a new epoch, returned to China with his wife and children, despite having comfortably settled in the United States.

=== Later career in China (1950–1985) ===
Back in China, Hua threw himself into educational reform and the organization of mathematical activity at the graduate level, in the schools, and among workers in the burgeoning industry. In July 1952 the Mathematical Institute of the Chinese Academy of Sciences (CAS) came into being, with Hua as its first director. In 1953, he was one of a 26-member delegation from CAS to visit the Soviet Union to establish links with Russian science. Later, he was the first chair of the Department of Mathematics and Vice President of University of Science & Technology of China (USTC), a new type of Chinese university established by CAS in 1958, aimed at fostering skilled researchers necessary for the economic development, defense and education in science and technology.

Despite his many teaching and administrative duties, Hua remained active in research and continued to write, not only on topics that had engaged him before but also in areas that were new to him or had been only lightly touched on before. In 1956, his voluminous text Introduction to Number Theory appeared. It was later published in English by Springer. Harmonic Analysis of Functions of Several Complex Variables in the Classical Domains came out in 1958 and was translated into Russian in the same year, followed by an English translation by the American Mathematical Society in 1963.

Outside of pure math, Hua first proposed in 1952 the development of China's electronic computer, and in early 1953, an initial research team for this project was formed under Hua's leadership by the Mathematical Institute of the Chinese Academy of Sciences.

The start of the Great Leap Forward in 1958 came with a vehement attack on pure mathematics and intellectuals, prompting Hua to shift to applied mathematics. He and Wang Yuan developed a broad interest in linear programming, operations research, and multidimensional numerical integration. In connection with the last of these, the study of the Monte Carlo method and the role of uniform distribution led them to invent an alternative deterministic method based on ideas from algebraic number theory. Their theory was set out in Applications of Number Theory to Numerical Analysis, which was published in 1978, and by Springer in English translation in 1981. The newfound interest in applicable mathematics took him in the 1960s, accompanied by a team of assistants, all over China to show workers of all kinds how to apply their reasoning to shop-floor and everyday problems. Whether in ad hoc problem-solving sessions in factories or open-air teachings, he touched his audiences with the spirit of mathematics to such an extent that he became a national hero and even earned an unsolicited letter of commendation from Mao Zedong, a valuable protection in uncertain times. Hua had a commanding presence, a genial personality, and a talent for putting things simply, and his travels spread his fame and the popularity of mathematics across the land.

After the Cultural Revolution, Hua resumed contact with Western mathematicians. In 1980 Hua became a cultural ambassador of China charged with re-establishing links with Western academics, and over the next five years he traveled extensively in Europe, the United States, and Japan. In 1979 he was a visiting research fellow of the then Science Research Council of the United Kingdom at the University of Birmingham and during 1983–84 he was Sherman Fairchild Distinguished Scholar at the California Institute of Technology. He died of a heart attack at the end of a lecture he gave in Tokyo on 12 June 1985.

Hua Luogeng Park in Jintan, Jiangsu, is named after him.

== Works ==
- Additive Theory of Prime Numbers (Translations of Mathematical Monographs : Vol 13). Amer Mathematical Society. 1966. ISBN 978-0-8218-1563-2.
- Introduction to Number Theory. Springer. 1987. ISBN 978-3-540-10818-4.
- Hua, Loo-keng (1981). Starting with the Unit Circle: Background to Higher Analysis. Berlin: Springer-Verlag. ISBN 978-0-387-90589-1.
- Loo-keng Hua: Selected Papers. Berlin: Springer Verlag. 1983. ISBN 978-0-387-90744-4.
