= Chih-Kung Jen =

Chinese physicist (1906–1995)

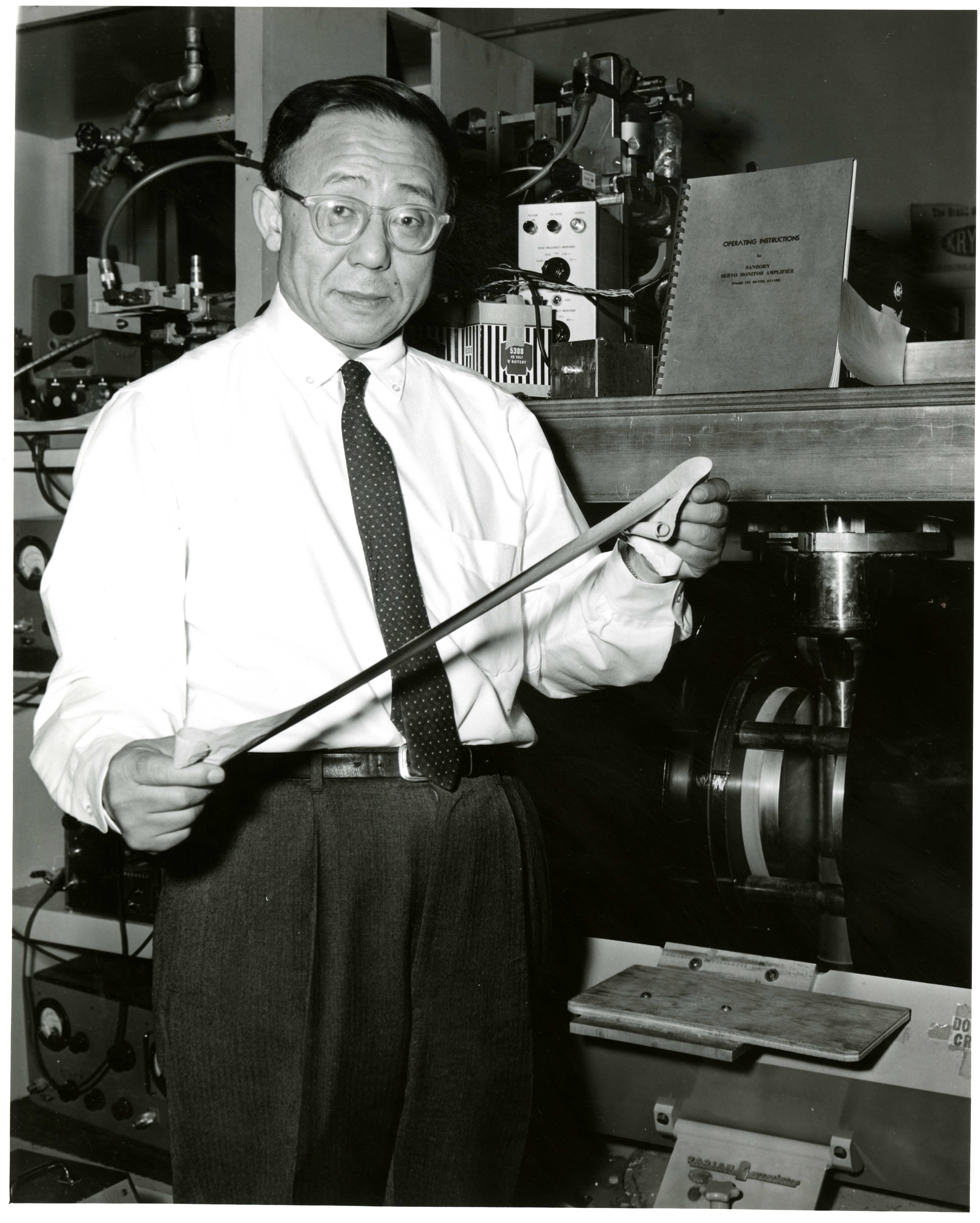
- Jen in 1962
- Born: August 15, 1906; Qinyuan County, Shanxi, Qing Empire
- Died: November 19, 1995 (aged 89); Needham, Massachusetts, U.S.
- Education: Massachusetts Institute of Technology (BS); University of Pennsylvania (MS); Harvard University (PhD)

Chih-Kung Jen (Chinese: 任之恭; pinyin: Rén Zhīgōng; August 15 or October 2, 1906 – November 19, 1995) was a Chinese physicist who emigrated to the U.S. and participated in some of the 20th century's major scientific, political and social developments in both the United States and China.

Born in a mud house in a remote and largely illiterate village in China, he was awarded a scholarship funded as a result of the Boxer Rebellion of the late 19th century to attend Beijing's prestigious Tsinghua University. As part of that scholarship, he came to the U.S. in 1926 to study electrical engineering and physics at MIT. He completed his graduate studies first at the University of Pennsylvania, and then in physics at Harvard University. Jen was among the first to provide experimental proof of the existence of the ionosphere. In addition, he obtained the first theoretically calculated value for the electron affinity spectrum of the hydrogen atom, a problem of fundamental significance in quantum mechanics and astrophysics.

In 1937, Jen returned to China, and subsequently joined in the "Academic Long March" to set up a wartime refugee university (the National Southwestern Associated University) in Kunming. His wartime teaching and research contributed to the training of what would become the nucleus of the present-day Chinese scientific intelligentsia.

After the war, Jen returned to the physics department at Harvard, and eventually settled at the Johns Hopkins Applied Physics Laboratory to carry on pioneering research in trapping free radicals and other topics in microwave spectroscopy.

In 1972, following Richard Nixon's visit to China, Jen led a ground-breaking delegation of Chinese American scientists to that country. The delegation conferred with Premier Zhou Enlai, and initiated what was to become a steady stream of scientific exchanges between the U.S. and China. Jen subsequently made numerous visits to China. He continued to work on strengthening U.S.-China scientific relations, and in addition was a leader in improving scientific education in Chinese universities.

== Full biography ==
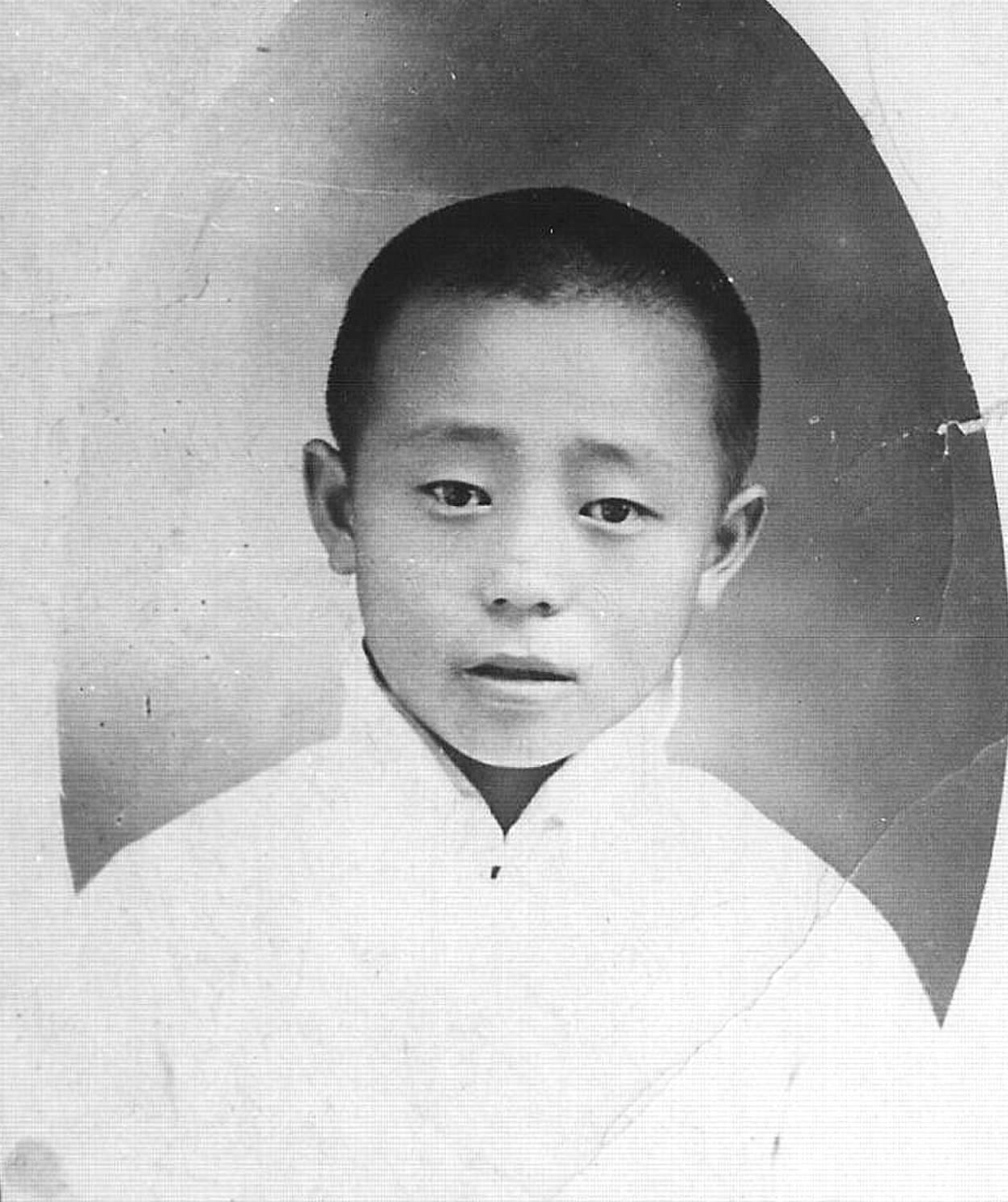
Jen c. 1920

C K Jen was born on October 2, 1906, in Hexi Village on the west bank of the Qin River in Shanxi Province in northern China. Shanxi Province is part of the Yellow River Valley which served as the "cradle of Chinese civilization," but by the time of Jen's birth, was a largely arid region populated by poor farmers struggling with overworked soil and periodic flooding. Jen was the second son in a family with five children. He began his elementary school education at age 11 and two years later entered middle school. At age 15, he was admitted to the prestigious Tsinghua University in Beijing, China. The students at Tsinghua were chosen from each province on the basis of that province's indemnity payment for the Boxer Uprising of 1900. While at Tsinghua, Jen participated in the May Fourth Movement, the first expression of what was to be a lifelong opposition to imperialism and colonialism throughout the world.

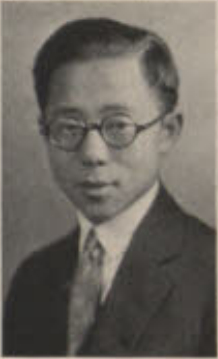
Jen in the Massachusetts Institute of Technology's 1928 yearbook.

In 1926 he came to the US to study at MIT, where his mentors included Norbert Wiener, Vannevar Bush, and others. He received a graduate fellowship to the University of Pennsylvania in 1928, where he published with G. W. Kendrick two papers on the experimental proof of the existence of the ionosphere. The following year he entered Harvard and in 1933 received his PhD in physics. While there, he derived the first theoretically calculated value for the electron affinity of the hydrogen atom (six years later to be improved by HSW Massey).

He returned to Tsinghua in 1934 and continued his research in numerous areas of experimental physics, including the effects of microwave radiation on animate objects, anticipating the microwave oven by some thirty years. His scientific research however inevitably became entwined with the political events of the time. After occupying Manchuria in the early 1930s, Japan invaded Beijing on July 27, 1937 (as luck would have it, the exact day Jen was to wed his wife pl:Paocheng Tao Jen). Subsequent to the Japanese invasion, Jen joined many of the remaining faculty and students of the three leading North China universities—Peking University, Tsinghua University, and Nankai University—in what became known as the "Academic Long March." The refugees fled first to Changsha in Hunan Province and then to Kunming in Yunnan Province, a distance of some 3000 km. In Kunming the 800-some faculty and student established the National Southwestern Associated University. Over the next eight years of bombing, deprivation and hardship, Jen persisted in his theoretical and experimental radio research as well as in his physics teaching responsibilities. His students during this period included future Nobel Prize winners C. N. Yang and T. D. Lee, and other distinguished researchers such as Chen-To Tai.

At the end of World War II, he returned to the United States on sabbatical leave at Harvard and turned his research focus to microwave spectroscopy. His work in this area was influenced by senior colleagues at Harvard including John Van Vleck, Charles Townes, Edward Purcell and others. In 1950, he became a senior physicist at the Johns Hopkins University Applied Physics Lab (APL), where he continued his research on microwave spectroscopy, and, together with collaborators including Samuel Foner, Edward Cochran, and others, carried out pioneering research on trapping of free radicals. Their paper on electron spin resonance (1958) proved to be one of the most frequently cited APL publications into the 21st century (Berl 1996). As stated in Physics Today (Moorjani 2001), the study led by Jen on the trapping of hydrogen atoms in a solid hydrogen matrix at liquid helium temperatures "allowed Norman Ramsey to infer the lifetime of hydrogen atoms bouncing around in the maser chamber and to conclude that the system will not be too lossy. Ramsey could therefore confidently proceed with the building of the hydrogen maser." Jen was the author of numerous entries on microwave physics in the McGraw-Hill Encyclopedia of Science and Technology and in the Encyclopedia of Physics.

Through the 1960s and 1970s, Jen became an outspoken political activist and participated in numerous anti-Vietnam War demonstrations. Following President Nixon's successful trip to China in February, 1972, he decided to organize a group of scholars to visit China as well. Overcoming numerous obstacles and objections, he led the first trip by a group of Chinese-American scientists to the People's Republic of China since World War II. The group was received by Premier Zhou Enlai. At the reception, Zhou spoke for the first time in public on the fate of Lin Biao and arrangements were made for Jen's youngest daughter, Erica Jen to become the first American student to study in China since 1949.

Jen made eight more visits to China. He devoted the latter part of his life to improving relations between the U.S. and China, and to the modernization of education, especially in physics, in China. He presented a series of lectures on recent advances in physics, including the Hall effect and nonlinear dynamics, to university students throughout China, and also lectured in the U.S. and Canada on developments in China since 1949. In 1981 his contributions were recognized by Deng Xiaoping, who gave a reception in his honor. He was granted honorary professorships by Tsinghua and four other universities.

Jen died on November 19, 1995, at a daughter's home in Needham, Massachusetts.

== Abbreviated list of publications ==
- Jen, C.K.; G.W. Kenrick (1929). "Measurements of the Height of the Kennelly-Heaviside Layer". Proc. IRE.
- —— (1933). "The Continuous Electron Affinity Spectrum of Hydrogen". Phys. Rev. 43 (7): 540–547. Bibcode:1933PhRv...43..540J. doi:10.1103/PhysRev.43.540.
- ——; K.T. Chow; Y.T. Lo; C.C. Kuan (1944). "An Observation on the Ionosphere During the Solar Eclipse of July 20, 1944". Phys. Rev. 66 (7–8): 226. Bibcode:1944PhRv...66..226J. doi:10.1103/PhysRev.66.226.
- —— (1948). "The Zeeman Effect in Microwave Molecular Spectra". Phys. Rev. 74 (10): 1396–1406. Bibcode:1948PhRv...74.1396J. doi:10.1103/PhysRev.74.1396.
- —— (1951). "Rotational Magnetic Moments in Polyatomic Molecules". Phys. Rev. 81 (2): 197–203. Bibcode:1951PhRv...81..197J. doi:10.1103/PhysRev.81.197.
- ——; S.M. Foner; E.L. Cochran; V.A. Bowers (1958). "Electron Spin Resonance of Atomic and Molecular Free Radicals Trapped at Liquid Helium Temperature". Phys. Rev. 112 (4): 1169–1182. Bibcode:1958PhRv..112.1169J. doi:10.1103/PhysRev.112.1169.
- —— (1963). "Free Radicals". Science. 142 (3589): 261–267. Bibcode:1963Sci...142..261J. doi:10.1126/science.142.3589.261. PMID 17834845.
- ——; Aamodt, L.; Jen, C. (1974). "Energy Transport in Ruby via Microwave Optical Experiments". Phys. Rev. B. 9 (5): 2009–2022. Bibcode:1974PhRvB...9.2009M. doi:10.1103/PhysRevB.9.2009.
- —— (1981). "Zeeman and Stark Effect". In R.G. Lerner; G.L. Trigg (eds.). Encyclopedia of Physics. Reading, MA: Addison-Wesley. pp. 1119–1129.
- —— (1981). "A Physicist's View of Science and Technology in China". Johns Hopkins APL Technical Digest. 2. 3.
- —— (1993). Recollections of a Chinese Physicist. Signition, Inc.
