= Gu Binglin =

Chinese physicist and material scientist

Gu Binglin (Chinese: 顾秉林, born October 8, 1945) is a Chinese physicist and material scientist. His research focuses on the field of condensed matter physics. He is the 17th president of Tsinghua University and a member of the Chinese Academy of Sciences.

== Education and career ==
=== Education ===
Gu began attending Tsinghua University in 1965, where he studied at the Department of Engineering Physics till 1970. After graduation, he taught at the Department of Engineering Physics at Tsinghua University while pursuing postgraduate studies. In 1979, he moved to Denmark to continue pursuing his postgraduate studies at the Aarhus University of Denmark, where he received his Doctoral Degree in Natural Sciences in 1982.

=== Career ===
In 1970, Gu joined the Department of Engineering Physics at Tsinghua University. He became an associate professor at its related department, the Department of Physics, in 1985. During his time as an associate professor, he worked as a senior visiting scholar at the University of Notre Dame from 1986 to 1987. After returning to Tsinghua University, he became a full professor in 1988. From 1993 to 1994, he taught as a guest professor at Tohoku University, before returning to Tsinghua University in 1994 to become the chairman of their Department of Physics. Gu became the assistant president and dean of the Tsinghua University graduate school in 2000, and was offered the vice president position in 2001, which he accepted. In 2003, he became the president of Tsinghua University, holding the position for nine years. In 2012, he stepped down from the president position, and became the director of Tsinghua University's Institute for Advanced Study.

== Awards and honors ==
Gu was elected as a member of the Chinese Academy of Sciences in 1999, while he was working as the chairman of the Department of Physics at Tsinghua university, and was elected as a foreign member of the Royal Swedish Academy of Engineering Sciences in 2010, while he was the President of Tsinghua University.

Gu has been awarded Honorary Doctorates from Waseda University, St. Petersburg University of Finance, Loughborough University, the Lyon Central University of Technology, and was awarded Honorary Professorship of the University of Aarhus.

As of 2022, Gu held many positions, such as the president of the Chinese Society of Micro-nano Technology, the president of Beijing Association for Science and Technology, and the vice chairman of All-China Environment Federation. Gu was also a member of the State Council Academic Degree Committee and National Science and Technology Award Committee.

Gu has been awarded the Second-class Prize of China's National Natural Science Award and the Advancement of Science and Technology Award sponsored by Hong Kong Ho Leung Ho Lee Foundation.

== Publications ==
Gu has published more than 300 works to date. Below are some of his major works.

1. Li, Jiaheng; Li, Yang; Du, Shiqiao; Wang, Zun; Gu, Bing-Lin; Zhang, Shou-Cheng; He, Ke; Duan, Wenhui; Xu, Yong (2019). "Intrinsic magnetic topological insulators in van der Waals layered MnBi 2 Te 4 -family materials". Sci. Adv. 5 (6). doi:10.1126/sciadv.aaw5685. ISSN 2375-2548. PMC 6570506. PMID 31214654 .
2. Li, Zuanyi; Qian, Haiyun; Wu, Jian; Gu, Bing-Lin; Duan, Wenhui (2008). "Role of Symmetry in the Transport Properties of Graphene Nanoribbons under Bias". Phys. Rev. Lett.. 100 (20): 206802. doi:10.1103/PhysRevLett.100.206802 .
3. Zhu, Jia-Lin; Xiong, Jia-Jiong; Gu, Bing-Lin (1990). "Confined electron and hydrogenic donor states in a spherical quantum dot of GaAs-Ga_{1-x}Al_{x}As. Phys. Rev. B. 41 (9): 6001–6007. doi:10.1103/PhysRevB.41.6001.
4. Han, Weiqiang; Fan, Shoushan; Li, Qunqing; Gu, Binglin; Zhang, Xiaobin; Yu, Dapeng. (1997) "Synthesis of silicon nitride nanorods using carbon nanotube as a template". App. Phys. Lett. 71: 2271–2273. doi:https://doi.org/10.1063/1.120550
5. Zheng, Fawei; Zhou, Gang; Liu, Zhirong; Wu, Jian; Duan, Wenhui; Gu, Bing-Lin; Zhang, S. B. (2008). "Half metallicity along the edge of zigzag boron nitride nanoribbons". Phys. Rev. B. 78 (20): 205415. doi:10.1103/PhysRevB.78.205415.
6. Huang, Bing; Liu, Miao; Su, Ninghai; Wu, Jian; Duan, Wenhui; Gu, Bing-lin; Liu, Feng (2009). "Quantum Manifestations of Graphene Edge Stress and Edge Instability: A First-Principles Study". Phys. Rev. Lett.. 102 (16): 166404. doi:10.1103/PhysRevLett.102.166404.
7. Si, Chen; Liu, Junwei; Xu, Yong; Wu, Jian; Gu, Bing-Lin; Duan, Wenhui (2014). "Functionalized germanene as a prototype of large-gap two-dimensional topological insulators". Phys. Rev. B. 89 (11): 115429. doi:10.1103/PhysRevB.89.115429.
8. Zhou, Gang; Duan, Wenhui; Gu, Binglin (2001). "First-principles study on morphology and mechanical properties of single-walled carbon nanotube". Chem. Phys. Lett.. 333 (5): 344–349. doi:10.1016/S0009-2614(00)01404-4. ISSN 0009-2614.
9. Huang, Bing; Liu, Feng; Wu, Jian; Gu, Bing-Lin; Duan, Wenhui (2008). "Suppression of spin polarization in graphene nanoribbons by edge defects and impurities". Phys. Rev. B. 77 (15): 153411. doi:10.1103/PhysRevB.77.153411.
