= Zhang Xiaowen (scientist) =

Chinese material scientist and politician

Zhang Xiaowen (Simplified Chinese: 张孝文; Traditional Chinese: 張孝文), born 1935, is a Chinese material scientist and politician. Zhang is the former President of Tsinghua University.

== Biography ==
Zhang was born in 1935 in Ningbo, Zhejiang Province. Zhang graduated (B.S.) from the Department of Mechanical Manufacture of Tsinghua University in 1957.

From 1980 to 1985, Zhang was an associate professor at Tsinghua. From 1983 to 1984, Zhang was a visiting scholar in the United States at Lehigh University then at the University of California, Berkeley. Zhang was promoted to professor at Tsinghua in 1985. Zhang was former head of the Department of Chemistry and Chemical Engineering, Tsinghua University. Zhang was Vice-dean of Tsinghua's College of Science, then the Vice-president of Tsinghua University. Zhang was the President of Tsinghua from October 1988 to January 1994.

Zhang was also a former Vice-minister of the Ministry of Education of the People's Republic of China.

In 1995, Zhang received an honorary doctorate from the Osaka Institute of Technology, Japan.

Zhang was an expert on ceramic materials and chemical engineering. During his presidential office at Tsinghua, Zhang made significant contributions to the development of the university, and the university started readopting into a comprehensive university status instead of a technical institute.
