= Bing Zhi =

Chinese zoologist (1886–1965)

- 秉志
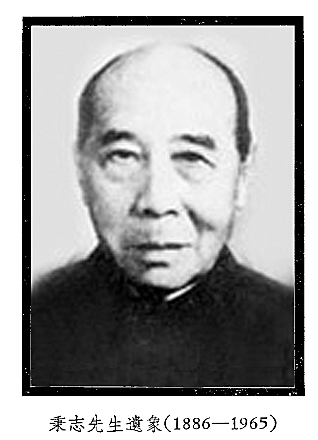
- Bing Zhi in 1965.
- Born: Zhai Bingzhi (翟秉志); April 9, 1886; Kaifeng, Henan, Qing China
- Died: February 21, 1965 (aged 78); Beijing, China
- Education: Peking University; Cornell University
- Scientific career
- Fields: Zoology
- Workplaces: Chinese Academy of Sciences

Bing Zhi (Chinese: 秉志; pinyin: Bǐng Zhì; Wade–Giles: Ping Chih; 9 April 1886 – 21 February 1965), was a Chinese zoologist of Manchu ancestry, considered the founder of China's neontology. He was an academician of the Chinese Academy of Sciences and Academia Sinica. He was a delegate to the 1st, 2nd and 3rd National People's Congress.

== Biography ==
Bing Zhi was born Zhai Bingzhi (Chinese: 翟秉志) in Kaifeng, Henan, on April 9, 1886, during the late Qing dynasty. His ancestral home in Jilin. Both his grandfather and father were teachers. In 1902 he attended the Imperial University of Henan. After graduating from the Imperial University of Peking (now Peking University) in 1908, he was sent abroad to study at the expense of the Qing government. He earned his bachelor's degree in 1913 from Cornell University under the supervision of J. G. Needham. In 1914 he organized the China Science Society and was an editor of Science. From 1918 to 1920 he was a researcher of H. H. Donaldso.

Bing returned to China in 1920 and that year became a professor at Nanjing Normal University. He joined the National Central University faculty in 1946, and moved to Fudan University in 1948.

In June 1955 he was elected a fellow of the Chinese Academy of Sciences.

On February 21, 1965, he died at 78.
