= Hsien-wen Wu =

Chinese ichthyologist (1900–1985)

- 伍獻文
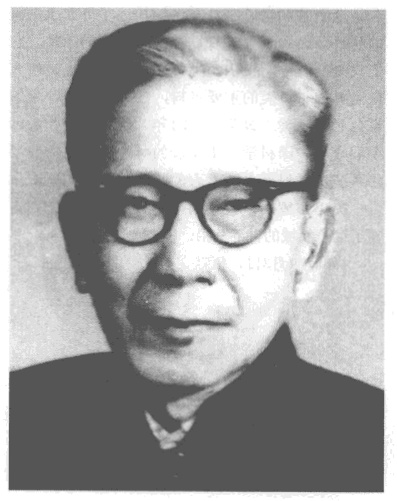
- Born: 15 March 1900; Rui'an, Zhejiang, Qing China
- Died: 3 April 1985 (aged 85); China

Academic background
- Education: Nanjing Higher Normal School; Xiamen University (Bachelor); University of Paris (PhD)
- Thesis: Contribution a l'Etude, morphologique, biologique et systematique des poisons heterosomata (Pisces Heterosomata) de la Chine

Hsien-wen Wu (also romanized as Wu Xianwen; simplified Chinese: 伍献文; traditional Chinese: 伍獻文; 15 March 1900 – 3 April 1985) was a Chinese zoologist and member of the Chinese Academy of Sciences.

== Biography ==
Born in 1900 in Rui'an, Zhejiang Province, Wu entered Nanjing Higher Normal School to study agriculture in 1918. Influenced by Bing Zhi, he decided to further study zoology. Wu graduated from Nanjing Higher Normal School in 1921.

After graduating from Nanjing Higher Normal School, he first went to Jimei University to teach. A year later, with the founding of Xiamen University, he moved to Xiamen University as an assistant lecturer in the biology department. Bing Zhi also came to Xiamen University, and on the advice of Bing he began to work and study simultaneously, and after graduating from Xiamen University with a Bachelor degree in 1927, he went on to teach at the National Central University, where he published his first report on ichthyology, "Study of fishes of Amoy", in 1929.

In 1929 he resigned from his position at the National Central University to attend the Université de Paris, where he was supervised by Louis Roule, and in 1932 graduated with a doctorate with the thesis "Contribution a l'Etude, morphologique, biologique et systematique des poisons heterosomata (Pisces Heterosomata) de la Chine". After graduation, he returned to China and joined the National Museum of Nature, Academia Sinica. He was also a professor of zoology at National Central University and of anatomy, embryology, and parasitology at Fudan University.

After the start of the Second Sino-Japanese War, he moved to Chongqing with the Academia Sinica. From 1940 to 1947, Wu directed Liu Jiankang and Zhang Xiaowei to publish several scientific reports on the respiratory mechanism of rice eels. After the end of World War II, Wu moved to Shanghai with the Academia Sinica. Disillusioned with the Nationalist government, Wu and others refused to retreat with the Nationalists to Taiwan. After the Shanghai Campaign, he participated in the preparatory meeting for the All-China Conference of Representatives of Natural Scientists organized by the Chinese Communist Party. In 1950, Wu and his colleagues who had stayed on the mainland formed the Institute of Aquatic Biology of the Chinese Academy of Sciences, which moved to Wuchang, Wuhan in 1954. Since the move, Wu has been leading research in ichthyology at the institute. In 1955, he became a member of the Chinese Academy of Sciences. He also traveled to Cuba, the Soviet Union and Czechoslovakia on a study tour in 1964.

From 1964 to 1977, Wu devoted himself to editing a two-volume monograph, The Cyprinid Fishes of China. 1964 also saw the publication of the first volume, which received many reviews. As the Cultural Revolution began, Wu was imprisoned and persecuted, and the authoring process was halted. It was not until after the fall of the Gang of Four in 1976 that his work continued. Eventually, the second volume was completed in 1977. Starting from 1977, under the leadership of Wu, the team of Chen Yiyu and Chen Xianglin applied cladistic systematic method to analyze the evolutionary process of the Cyprinidae, and published two papers in 1981 and 1984.

Wu died on April 3, 1985.
