= Dongguan Botanical Garden =

Botanical garden in Dongguan, China

Dongguan Botanical Garden 东莞植物园
- Interactive map of Dongguan Botanical Garden 东莞植物园
- Type: Landscape botanical garden
- Location: Nancheng District, Dongguan, Guangdong, China
- Coordinates: approx. 22.96°N 113.75°E
- Area: 468.5 hectares (1,158 acres) (overall plan), of which 200.5 hectares (495 acres) open to the public
- Opened: 1998 (as Dongguan Municipal Botanical Garden), renamed to present name in 2006
- Operator: Dongguan Urban Management and Comprehensive Law Enforcement Bureau
- Status: Open all year round
- Website: Official website

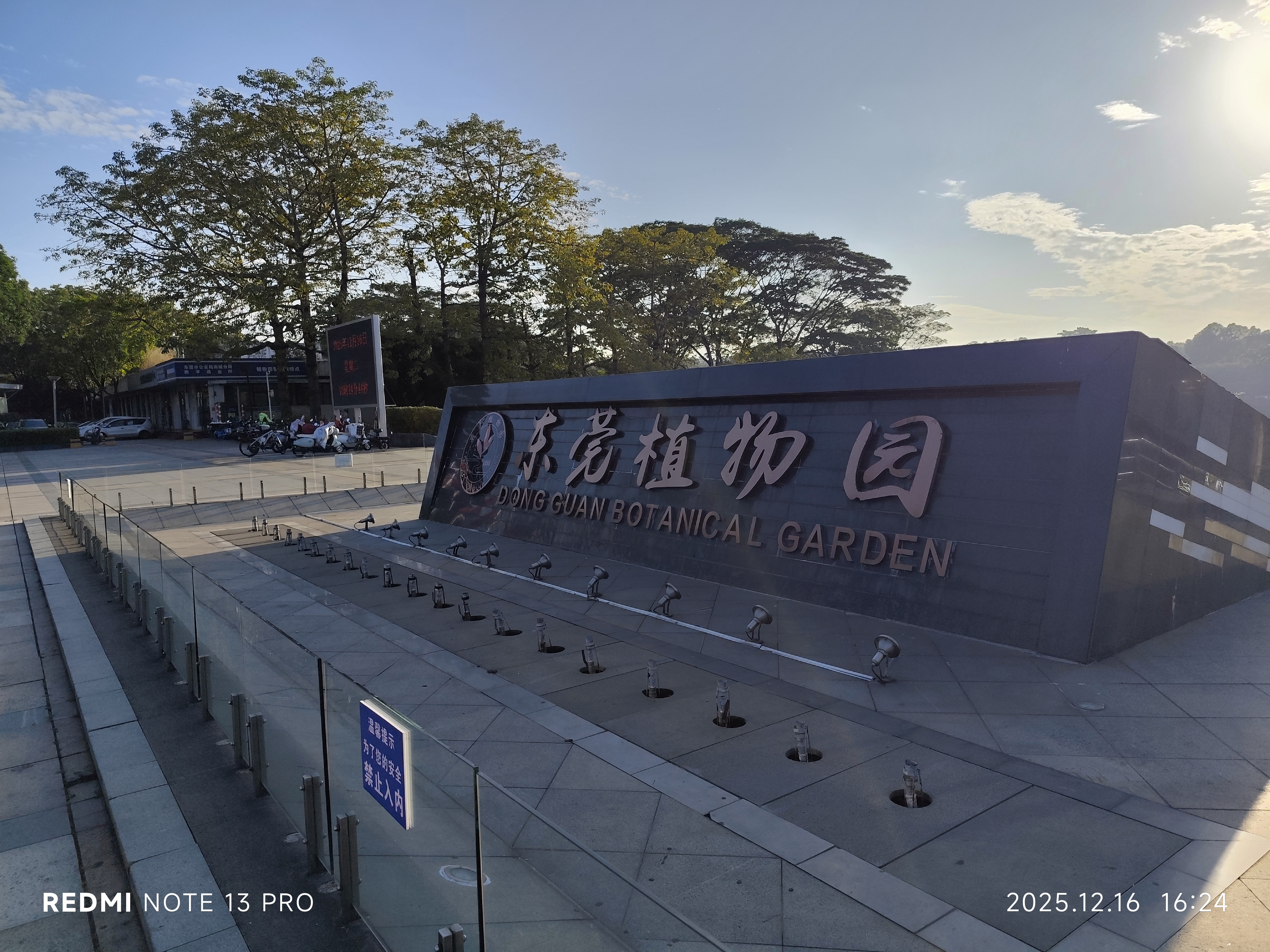
Dongguan Botanical Garden outdoor square name sign

Dongguan Botanical Garden (Chinese: 东莞植物园) is located in Nancheng District, Dongguan, Guangdong, China. It lies about 5 km (3.1 mi) south of downtown Dongguan, adjacent to Shuiliao Reservoir to the west, Tongsha Ecological Park to the east, and Shuilianshan Forest Park to the south. The garden covers a total area of 468.5 hectares (1,158 acres), of which 200.5 hectares (495 acres) are developed. It became a member of the Chinese Botanical Garden Alliance (now the China Botanical Garden Conservation Program) in 2013. The garden focuses on plant conservation, scientific research, public education, and ecological recreation. In 2025, it was included in the first batch of regional botanical gardens of Guangdong Province.

== History ==
The precursor of Dongguan Botanical Garden was the Dongguan County Banling Animal Husbandry Farm, established in 1958. It became the Banling Forest Farm in 1962, then the Banling Horticultural Farm in 1986. In 1998, it was officially established as Dongguan Municipal Botanical Garden under the municipal Agricultural Science Center. In 2004, the city government built the Green World Urban Park on the original site, completing the first phase of infrastructure. In 2006, the Green World Urban Park was merged into the garden and renamed Dongguan Botanical Garden, and its management was transferred to the Dongguan Urban Management and Comprehensive Law Enforcement Bureau.

From 2016 to 2018, the first-phase construction was completed. From 2021 to 2023, the second-phase improvement project was carried out. In 2025, the garden was included in the first batch of regional botanical gardens of Guangdong Province by the Guangdong Forestry Bureau.

== Gardens and landscapes ==
Dongguan Botanical Garden is planned with a "one vertical, five horizontal" road system, divided into a low and gentle eastern bank area and a hilly western bank area. The core open area is centered around Jinghu Lake. Sixteen specialized plant collections have been established, including the Rock Garden, Lychee Garden, Plant Evolution Education Garden, Orchid Garden, Shade Plant Garden, Herbal Garden, Agarwood Garden, Famous Tree and Flower Garden, Rhododendron Garden, Australian Plant Zone, Succulent Plant Zone, Bougainvillea Garden, Colorful Foliage Garden, Rubber Culture Garden, Camellia Garden, and Camphor Garden. Within the Famous Tree and Flower Garden, there are also sub‑gardens such as the Chinese Flora Garden, Cherry Blossom Garden, China‑Malaysia Friendship Garden, Rose Garden, Coffee Garden, and Hundred Flowers Valley.

According to a visitor survey conducted from 2014 to 2015, the most popular attractions were the large grassy slope (European-style lawn), the aquatic plant landscape area, and the Angiosperm Evolution Garden. The Angiosperm Evolution Garden covers about 10.7 hectares and displays over 300 representative species from major evolutionary groups, arranged according to the "multi‑lineage, multi‑stage, multi‑region" eight‑class system of angiosperm classification.

== Plant conservation ==
As of February 2026, the garden has collected and conserved 4,834 plant species (including infraspecific taxa), of which 316 are nationally or provincially protected wild plants. The garden houses a lychee germplasm repository. By 2025, it had preserved 390 lychee accessions, accounting for about 60% of the known lychee varieties in China. Its independently bred variety 'Guangzhi No. 1' has passed the public announcement period for new plant variety rights by the Ministry of Agriculture and Rural Affairs, while 'Guangzhi No. 2' is under review.

In terms of rare plant introduction, in March 2022, the Dongguan Urban Management and Comprehensive Law Enforcement Bureau held a voluntary tree‑planting activity at the garden, planting 300 trees of 61 species including Machilus phoenicis, Phoebe sheareri, and Cinnamomum japonicum, forming a background forest dominated by Lauraceae in the Shade Garden. These seedlings were introduced as seeds or young plants from Hunan, Hubei and other places by the garden’s research team and cultivated for more than ten years. In March 2023, the garden planted more than 40 rare seedlings including Magnolia sinica, which were grown from seeds over six to seven years.

In addition, the garden provides scions of improved lychee varieties to growers free of charge, cumulatively promoting nearly 46.7 hectares of excellent lychee varieties over three years.

== Scientific research ==
The scientific research of Dongguan Botanical Garden focuses on the collection, conservation, and sustainable use of tropical and subtropical rare and endangered plants, plants with Lingnan characteristics, and garden ornamental plants.

In plant introduction and domestication, the research team has long collected seeds and seedlings from various parts of China and cultivated them for years to produce high‑quality materials adapted to the local climate. For example, the Lauraceae plants planted in 2022 were introduced from Xinning, Hubei (Enshi), and other places and domesticated for more than a decade. The Magnolia sinica planted in 2023 was also grown from seeds over six to seven years.

In terms of new species discovery, in 2021, researchers Feng Xinxin and Liu Zhixian from the garden, together with Dr. Tian Daike from Shanghai Chenshan Botanical Garden, published a new species of Begonia in the international plant taxonomy journal PhytoKeys: Begonia pseudoedulis. The new species was collected from the Shiwan Mountains in Guangxi. It morphologically resembles Begonia edulis but differs in having reddish‑brown hairs on the petioles, inflorescence axes, petals, ovary, and capsule. A molecular phylogenetic tree based on ITS sequences also supports its distinct status. The research was supported by the Dongguan Social Science and Technology Development Key Project and the National Natural Science Foundation of China.

In plant protection, the garden has carried out systematic research on common pests and diseases. A 2025 paper titled "Examples of Integrated Pest Management at Dongguan Botanical Garden" summarized control experiences for diseases such as leaf spot, rust, sooty mold, and insect pests including Icerya aegyptiaca, Phauda flammans, and termites. Notably, an agricultural drone was used to spray pesticide on 15–20 m tall Michelia × alba trees to control Icerya aegyptiaca.

== Public education ==
The garden is a "National Nature Education Base" and a "Guangdong Provincial Science Education Base". It carries out science communication through plant labels, educational panels, special lectures, and interactive activities featuring characteristic plants. A 2014 survey showed that 92.6% of visitors rated the landscape as "very good" or "good".

On‑site facilities include a parking lot (637 spaces), a restaurant, and public restrooms. According to a 2022 plan, the city of Dongguan will build 150 pocket parks, some of which will receive technical support from the botanical garden.

== See also ==
- List of botanical gardens in China
- Dongguan
- South China Botanical Garden
- Guangdong
