= Chen Fenghuai =

Chinese botanist (1900–1993)

- 陈封怀
- Born: 16 May 1900; Nanjing, Jiangsu, Qing Dynasty
- Died: 13 April 1993 (aged 92); Guangzhou, Guangdong, PRC
- Resting place: Lushan Botanical Garden, Mount Lu
- Education: Jinling University; National Central University (Nanjing); Royal Botanic Garden Edinburgh
- Scientific career
- Fields: Botany
- Workplaces: Tsinghua University; Nanchang University

Chen Feng Huai (Chinese: 陈封怀, 16 May 1900 – 13 April 1993), also spelled Chen Feng Hwai, was a Chinese botanist known primarily for his contributions to the construction and administration of botanical gardens in China.

Chen was born in 1900. He was the great-grandson of Chen Baozhen, governor of Hunan. He studied at Jinling University (later University of Nanking). He later studied at Royal Botanical Garden of Edinburgh in the 1930s. After he returned to China, he held a position at Nanchang University.

He contributed greatly to the construction of botanical gardens in China. He was the director and a co-founder of the Lushan Botanical Garden, the Zhongshan Botanical Garden in Nanjing, the Wuhan Botanical Garden and the South China Botanical Garden.

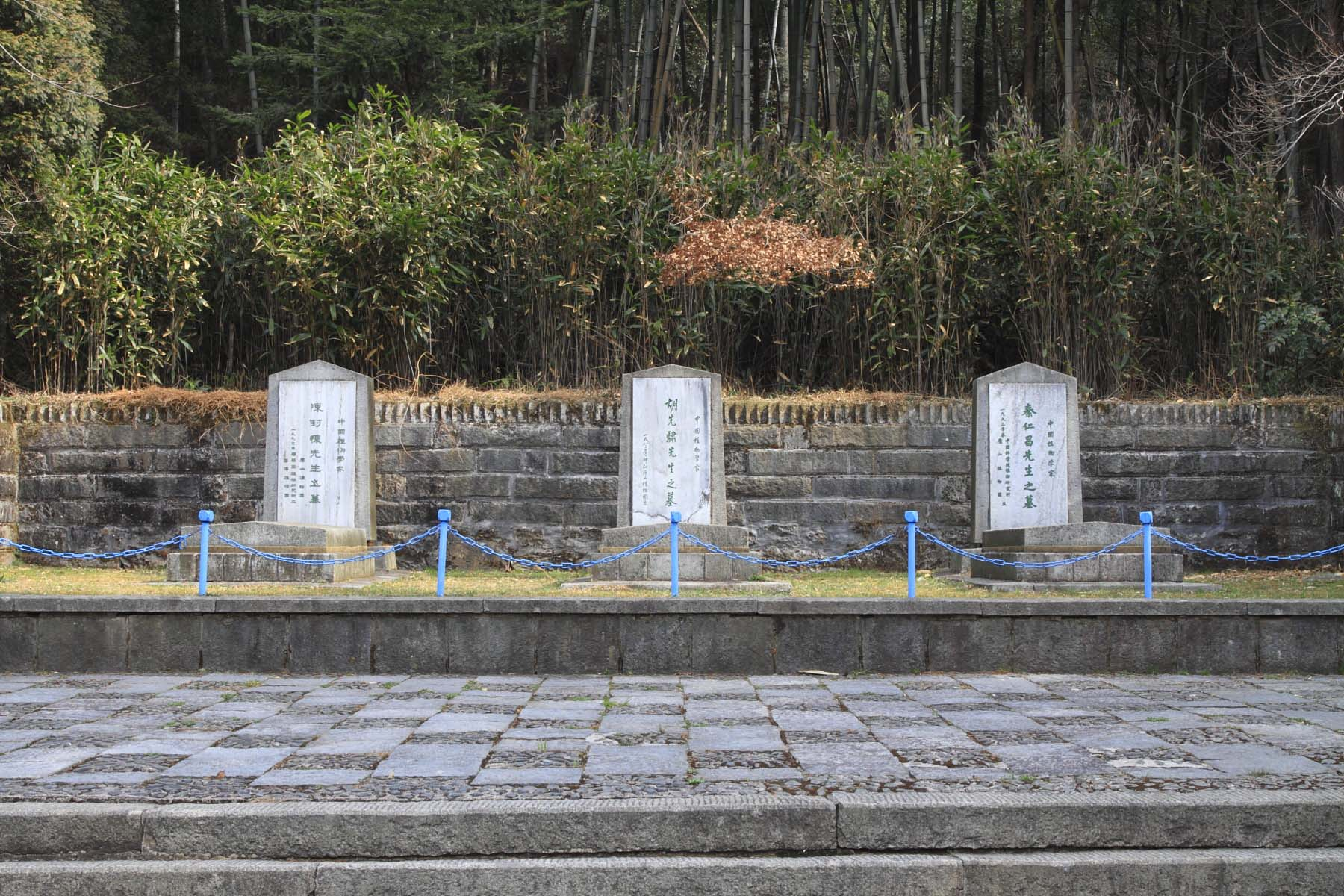
Tombs of the Three EldersTombs of Chen Fenghuai, Hu Xiansu, and Ren-Chang Ching at Lushan Botanical Garden

Chen died in 1993 and was buried at Lushan Botanical Garden in his beloved place, both of his career and of his family residence, along with two colleagues and fellow founders of the botanical garden, Hu Xiansu and Ren-Chang Ching.
