= Sung Shu Chien =

Chinese botanist (1883–1965)

- 钱崇澍
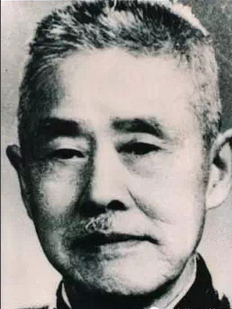
- Born: 11 November 1883; Haining County, Zhejiang, Qing China
- Died: 28 December 1965 (aged 82); Beijing, China

Academic background
- Education: Nan Yang Public School; Tangshan Road Mining School; Preparatory school of Tsinghua University; University of Illinois Urbana-Champaign (BS); University of Chicago (MS); Harvard University

Sung Shu Chien (also romanized as Qian Chongshu; simplified Chinese: 钱崇澍; traditional Chinese: 錢崇澍; 11 November 1883 – 28 December 1965) was a Chinese botanist and member of the Chinese Academy of Sciences.

== Biography ==
Chien was born on 11 November 1883 to a family of intellectuals in Haining County, Zhejiang Province. (Note: some very early Chinese documents, such as a 1917 book "Classmates in the United States" of Tsinghua College, say he was born in Shanghai.) In 1904, he was awarded the title of Xiucai in the last imperial examination held by the Qing Dynasty. In 1905, he was admitted to Nan Yang Public School (the antecedent of Xi'an Jiaotong University and Shanghai Jiaotong University). In 1909, he was sent to the Tangshan Road Mining School (now known as Southwest Jiaotong University) to study.

In 1910, he entered the preparatory school of Tsinghua University as a publicly funded student and went to the United States to study in the same year. He first studied agronomy in the College of Science at the University of Illinois. A year later, he transferred to the University of Illinois College of Natural Sciences, majoring in botany, and graduated in July 1914 with a Bachelor of Science degree. He then studied at the University of Chicago and Harvard University, obtaining his master's degree from the University of Chicago.

Chien returned to China in 1916 and taught at Beijing Agricultural College, Tsinghua University, Fudan University, Xiamen University, and Sichuan University. In 1916, Chien published "Two Asiatic Allies of Ranunculus pensylvanicus", which was the first paper by a Chinese author to express plant names and classifications in Latin, and this paper marked the birth of modern plant taxonomy in China. In 1923, he collaborated with Zou Bingwen and Hu Xiansu to write China's first biology textbook, Advanced Botany, and in 1926 he became the first dean of the Department of Biology at Tsinghua University.

In 1933, he participated in the founding of the Botanical Society of China, and after the outbreak of the Second Sino-Japanese War in 1937, he came from Nanjing to Beibei, Chongqing. He moved back to Shanghai with Fudan University after the end of the World War II. In 1948, he was elected as a member of the Academia Sinica. He was also a delegate to the first session and a member of the second and third standing committees of the National People's Congress, and a member of the Standing Committee of the National Committee of the Chinese People's Political Consultative Conference. In 1955, he was elected a member of the Chinese Academy of Sciences.

In October 1959, he established the Flora of China Editorial Board and led its writing until 1965, when he died. He died on 28 December 1965 at the age of 82 years.
