= China National Botanical Garden =

Botanical garden in Beijing, China

- 国家植物园

- Location within Beijing Location within China
- Interactive map of China National Botanical Garden
- Type: Botanical garden, Urban park
- Location: Haidian District, Beijing, China
- Coordinates: 39°59′34″N 116°12′34″E
- Area: 400 hectares (990 acres)
- Created: 1956
- Status: Open all year
- Website: chnbg.cn chnbg.cn/en

The China National Botanical Garden (Chinese: 国家植物园; pinyin: Guójiā Zhíwùyuán) is a national botanical garden (Note: Other national-level botanical gardens in China: South China National Botanical Garden, Qinling National Botanical Garden.) located in Haidian, Beijing, China. Chartered in 2022, the garden is co-sponsored by the National Forestry and Grassland Administration, the Ministry of Housing and Urban-Rural Development, the Chinese Academy of Sciences, and the Beijing Municipal People's Government.

The garden is integrated on the basis of the existing conditions of the Institute of Botany of the Chinese Academy of Sciences (South Garden) and the Beijing Botanical Garden (North Garden), with a total planned area of nearly 600 hectares (1,500 acres). The garden is located in between Fragrant Hills Park and Jade Spring Hill in the Western Hills.

== Establishment ==
The National Botanical Garden is based on the existing conditions of the Institute of Botany of the Chinese Academy of Sciences (South Garden) and the Beijing Botanical Garden (North Garden), through the organic integration of expansion and efficiency. The South Garden is mainly based on scientific research and experiments, focusing on the research and development of core technologies for plant basic scientific research, biodiversity conservation and plant resource utilization. The North Garden focuses on ex situ collection, popular science, and exhibition, focusing on plant application research, conservation of rare and endangered plants, collection and display of horticultural plants, and research and training on gardening and horticultural technologies.

Botanist Hu Xiansu championed the creation of the Garden for decades, earning him the title "father" of the project upon its eventual completion.

Botanist Ma Jinshuang serves as the chief scientist of the National Botanical Garden since 2020.

== Collection ==
The gardens cultivate 6,000 species of plant, including 2,000 kinds of trees and bushes, 1,620 varieties of tropical and subtropical plants, 500 species of flowers and 1,900 kinds of fruit trees, water plants, traditional Chinese.

The hothouse exhibition is the highlight of the gardens.

- The first room is filled with evergreens and members of the palm family.
- The second room is given over to tropical aquatic plants, including water lilies and flowering taros.
- The third room displays commercial plants and their breeding and propagation. Here there are specimens of the triple-leaved rubber plant, cocoa and coffee trees and the sugar producing sweet-leaved chrysanthemum which has been introduced into China from abroad.

There are rooms for demonstrating medicinal plants, aromatic plants and succulents. The exhibition of ornamental plants is spectacular with its countless varieties if flowers and grasses. There are over 300 different varieties of orchid, among them a rootless one that relies on fine hairs to absorb water vapor and nutrients from the air.

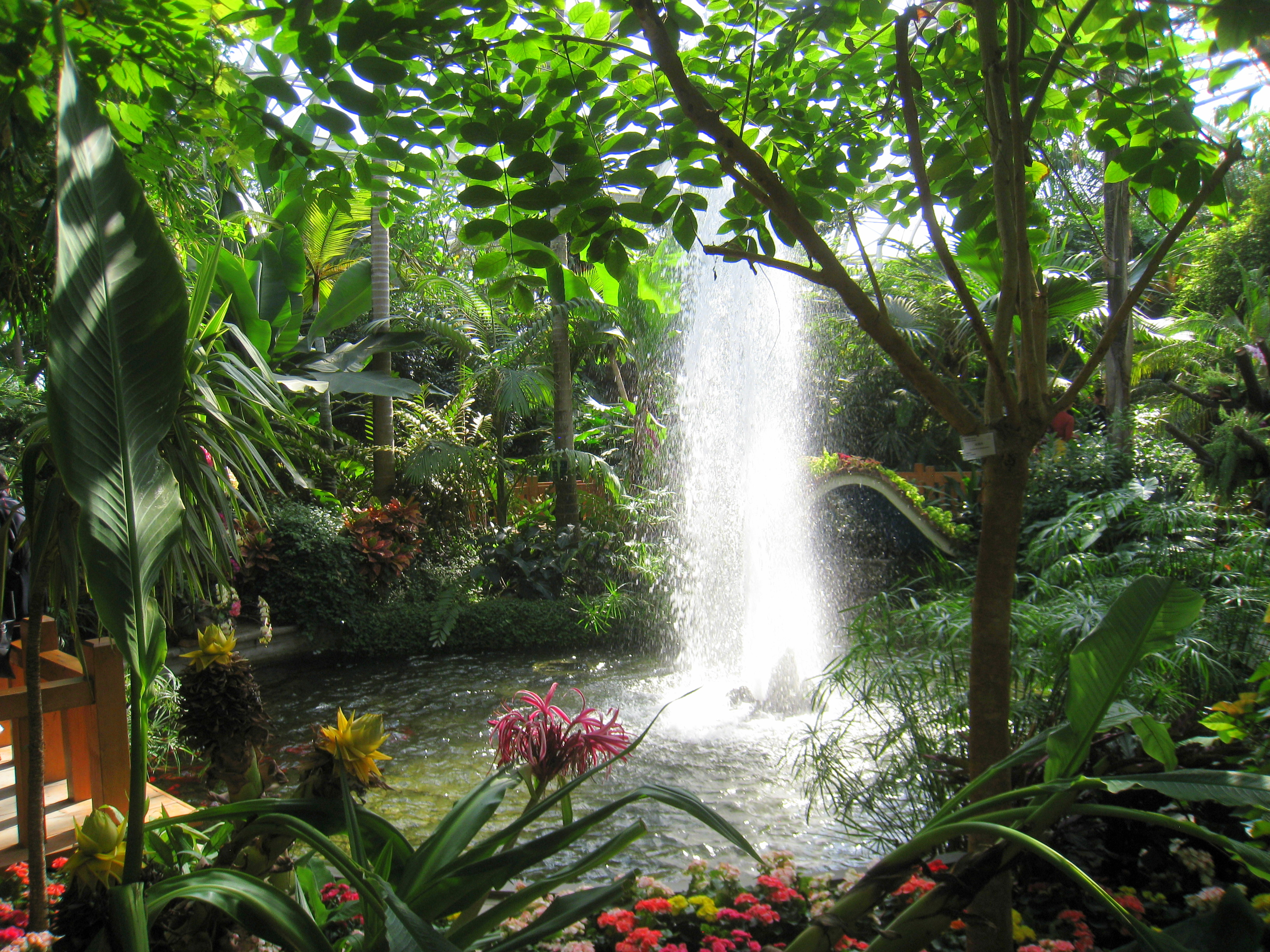

Besides the hothouse, there is also a national plant specimen hall with a floor space of 11,000 square meters. Specimen houses, plant classification laboratories, research rooms and a lecture hall are arranged around a courtyard linked by arches and trellises.

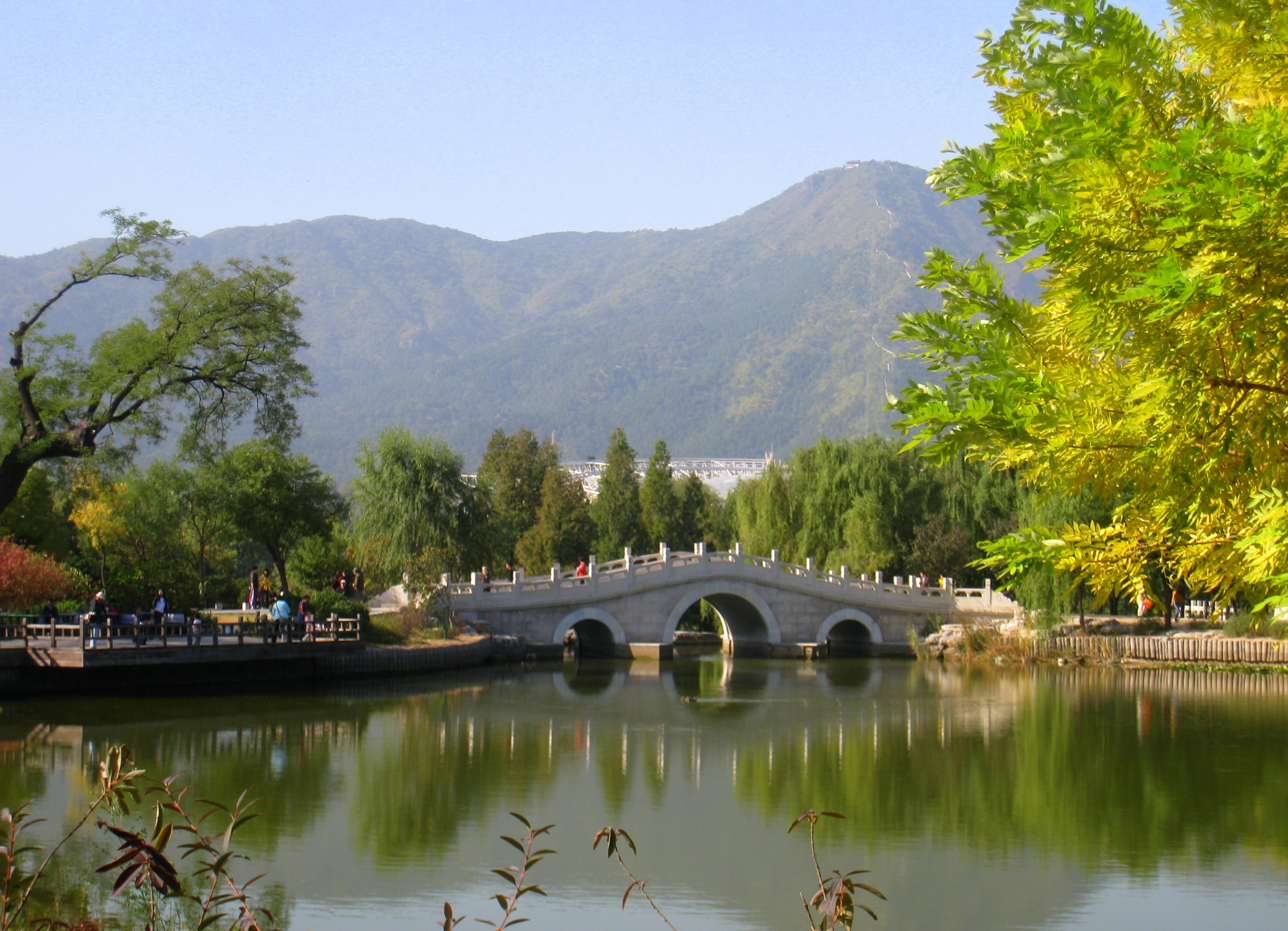
The Beijing Botanical Garden

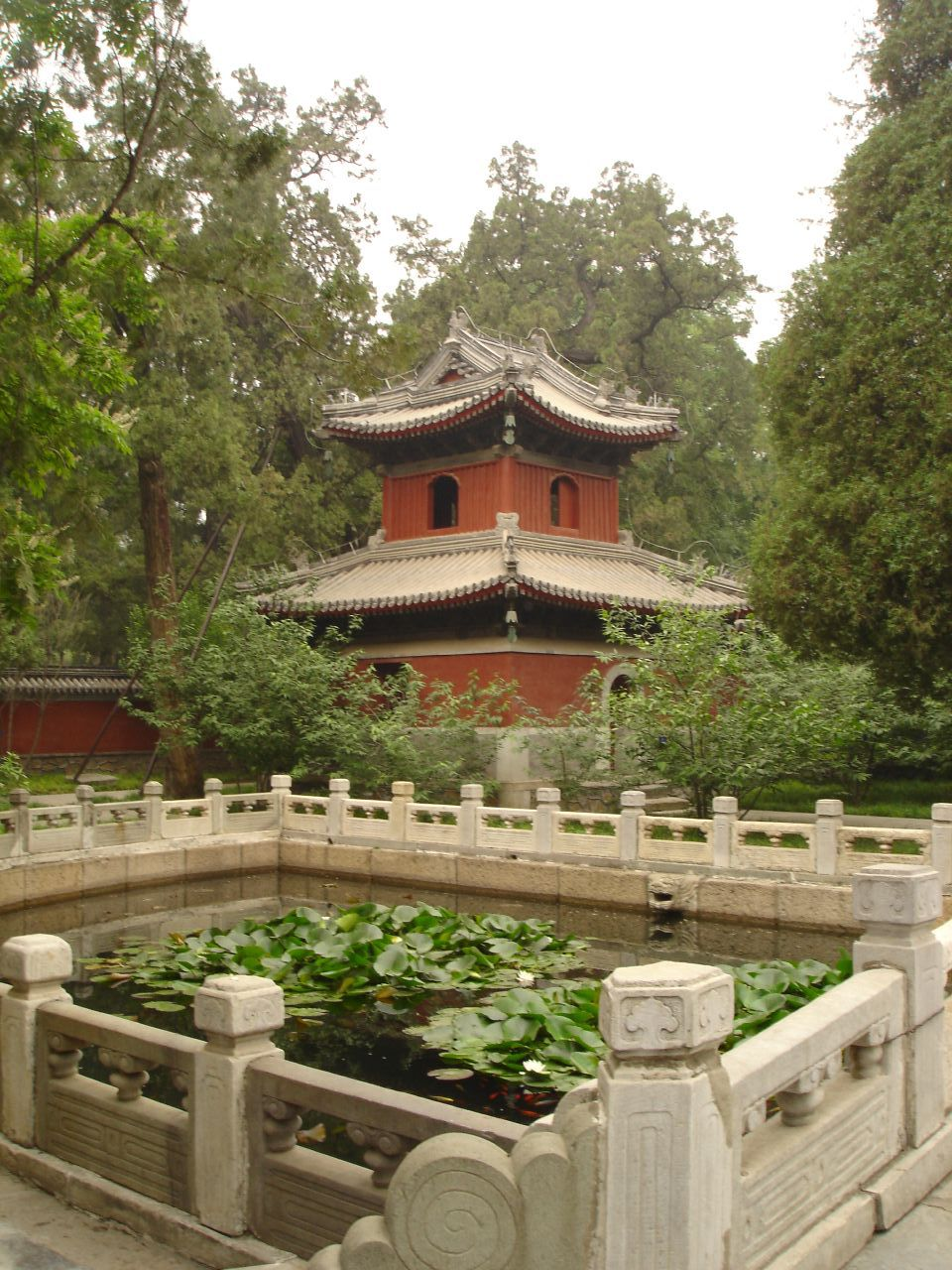

The Peony Garden was open to the public in 1981. It covers an area of 100,000 square metres (1,100,000 sq ft) and is divided into three sections. The Peony Grove is the most important, covering an area of 35,000 square metres (380,000 sq ft).

The plant collection includes many rare species. There is, for example, the metasequoia first discovered in the region of Hubei and Sichuan by a Chinese scientist in the 1940s. Since it was originally believed that it had become extinct during the Paleogene Period (66 million years ago), the discovery of living specimens in China came as a tremendous surprise to botanists.

Other plants in the gardens include Nepenthes pitcher plants, which are carnivorous plants; the golden butterfly orchid with its lustrous yellow flowers; the American redwood; the Japanese blossoming cherry, and the famous "bodi tree", the tree under which Buddha sat when he gained enlightenment.

== Gallery and display of flowers ==
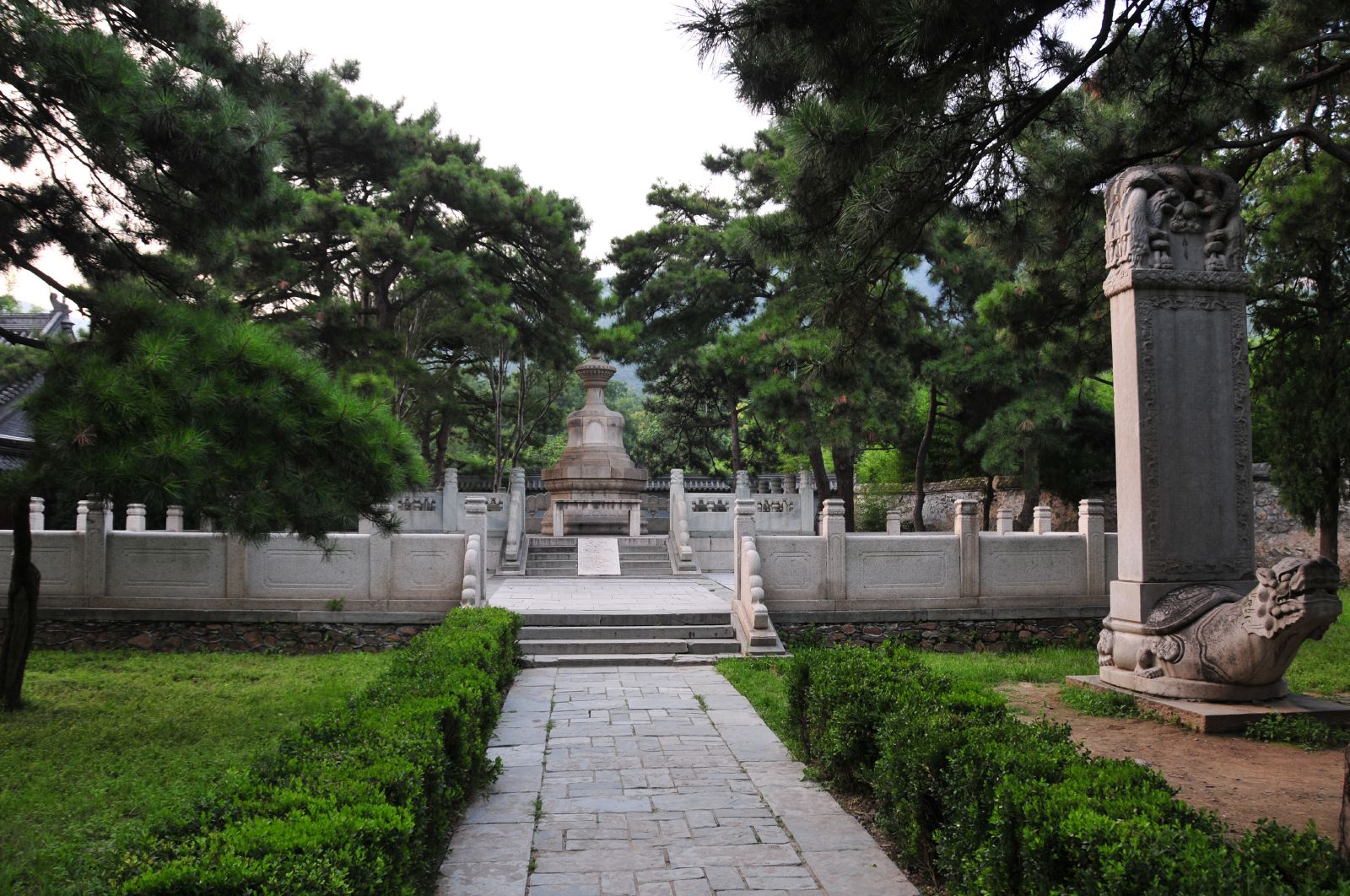

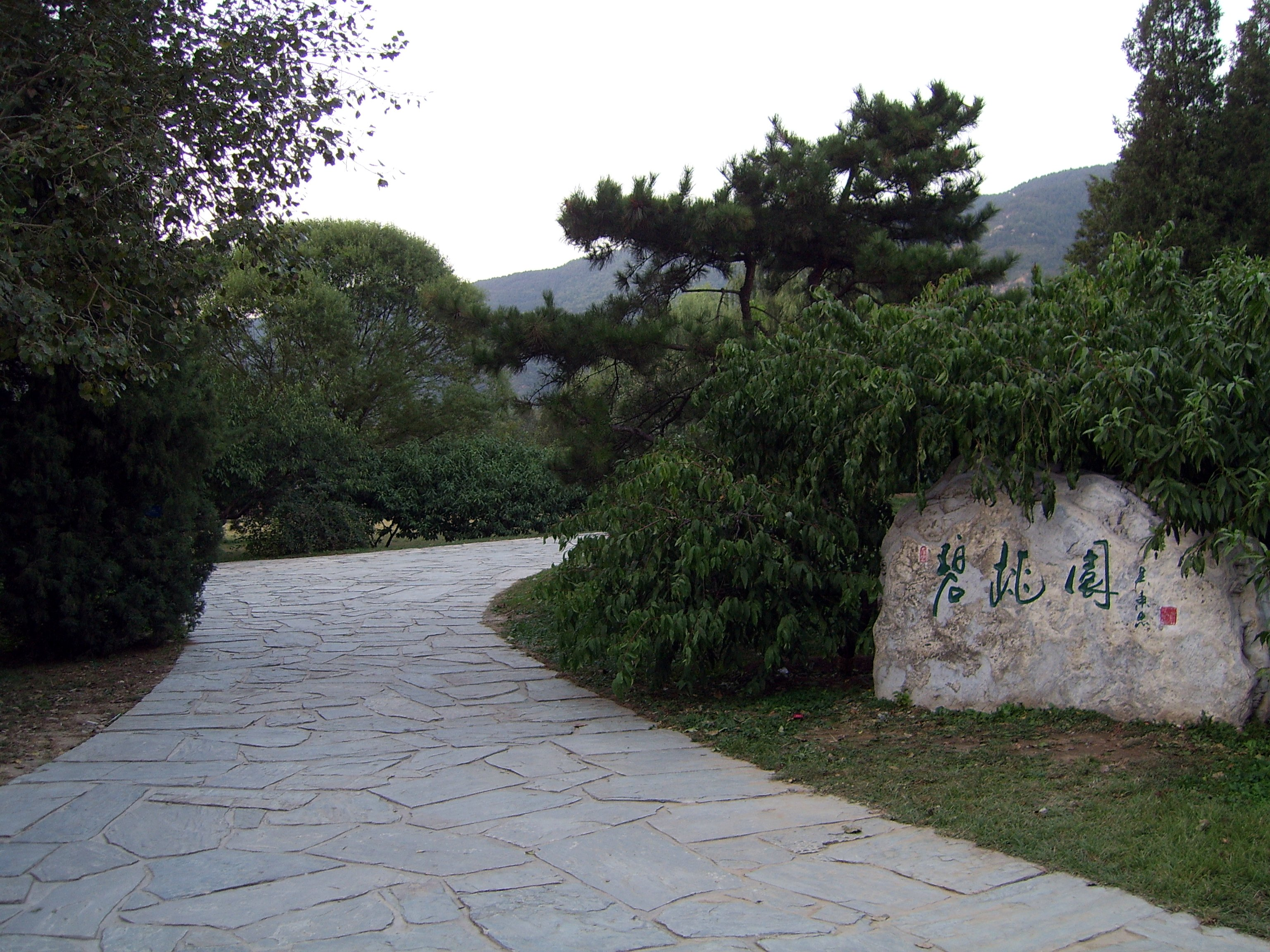

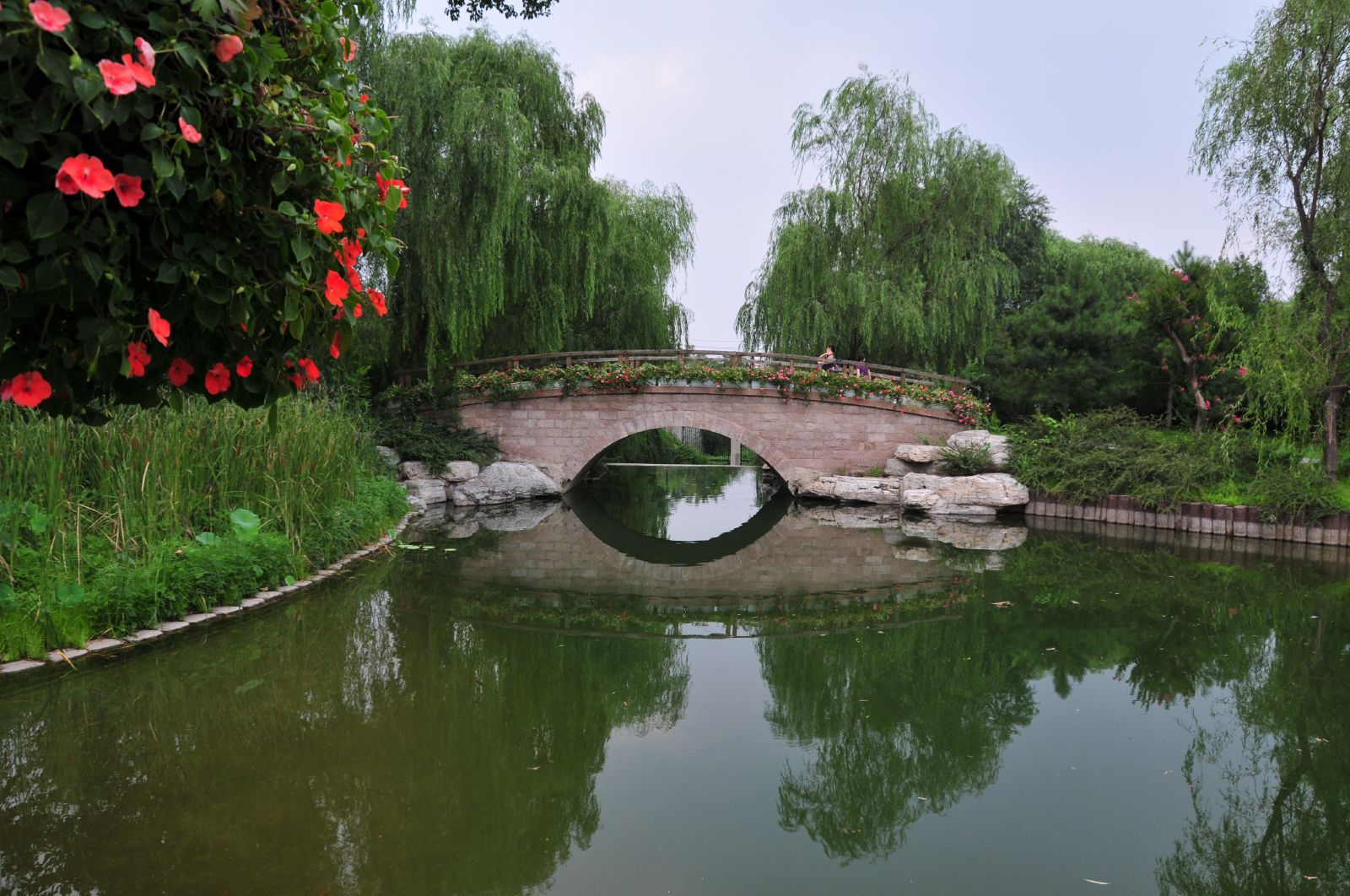

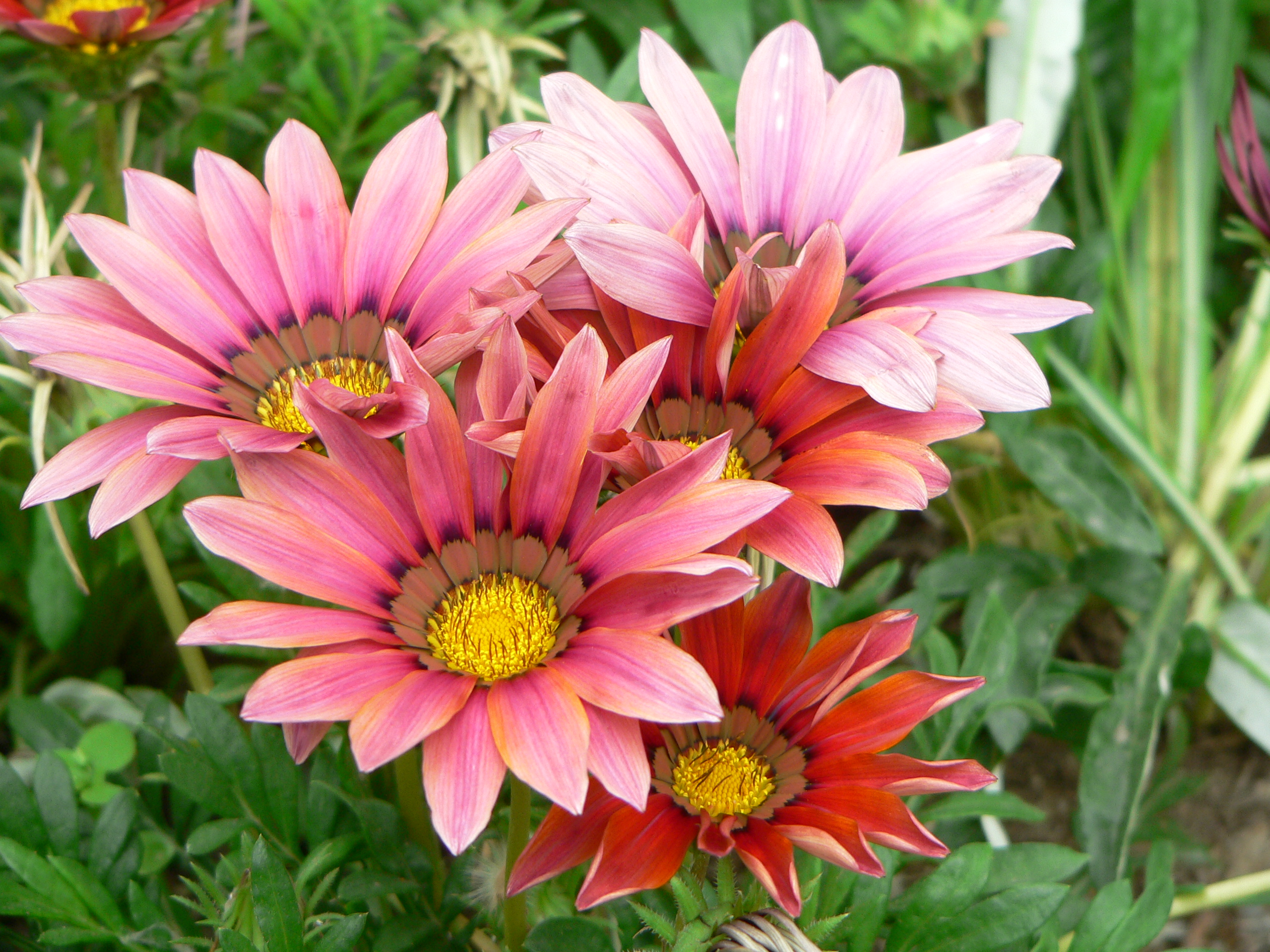

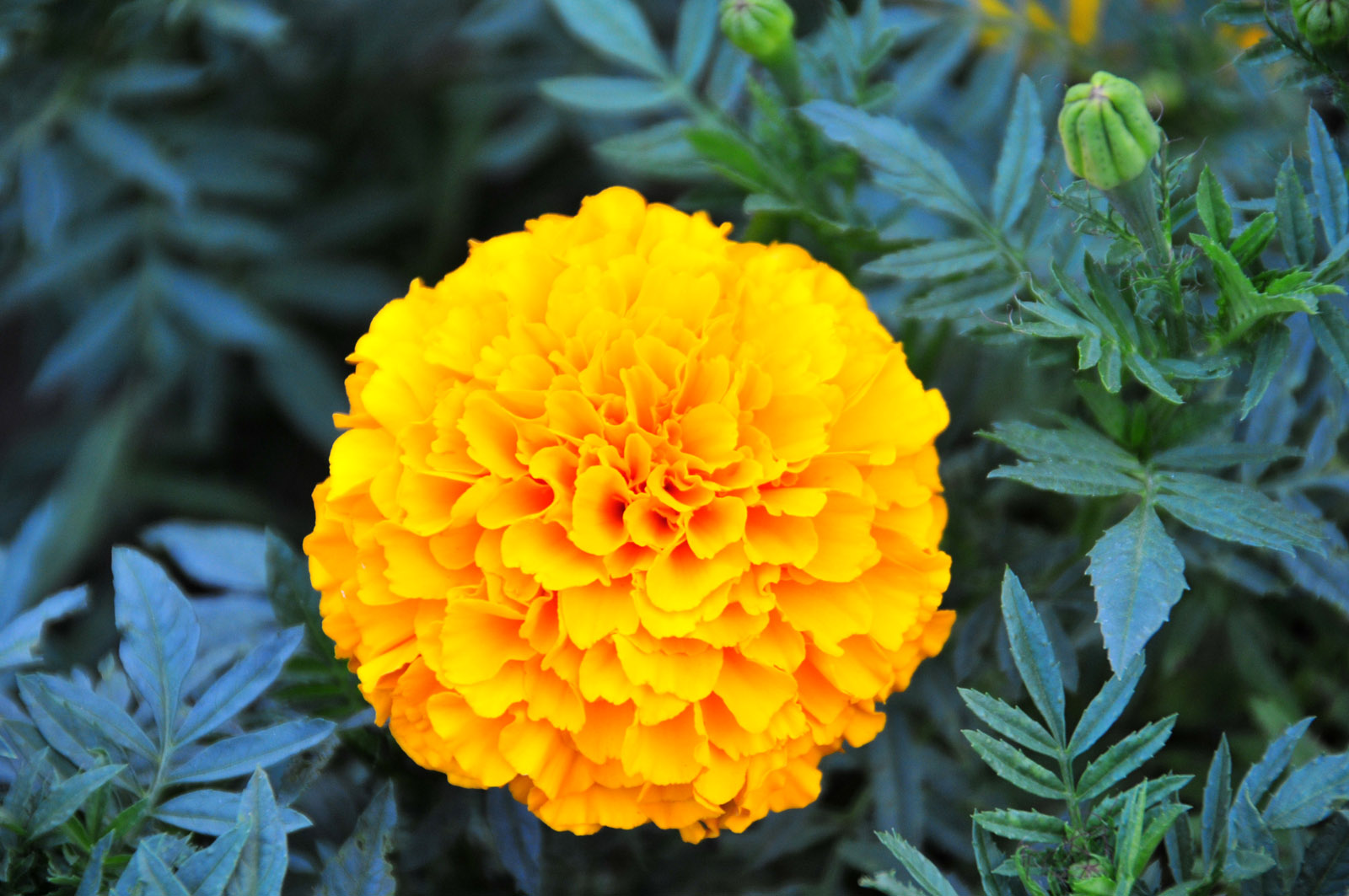

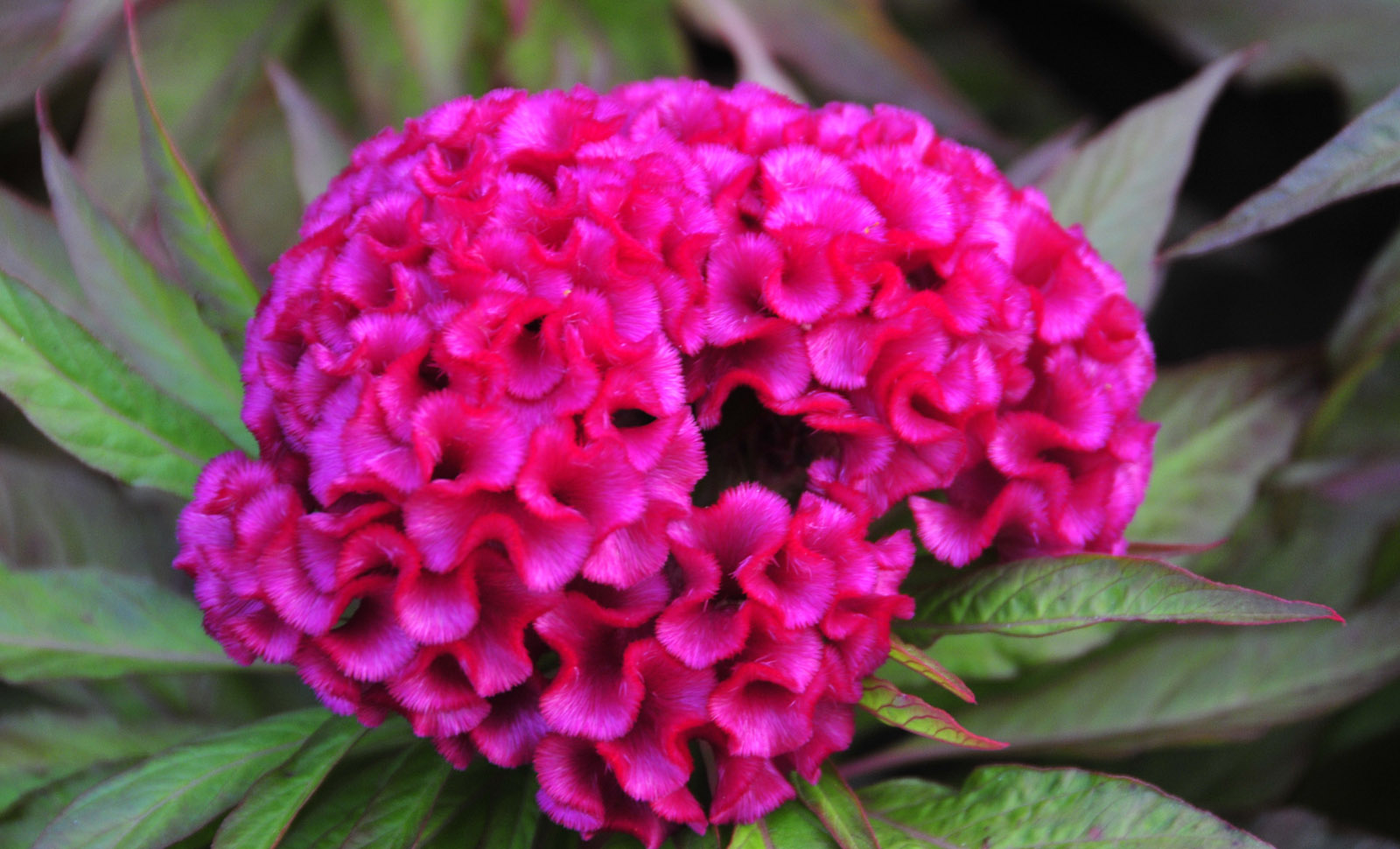

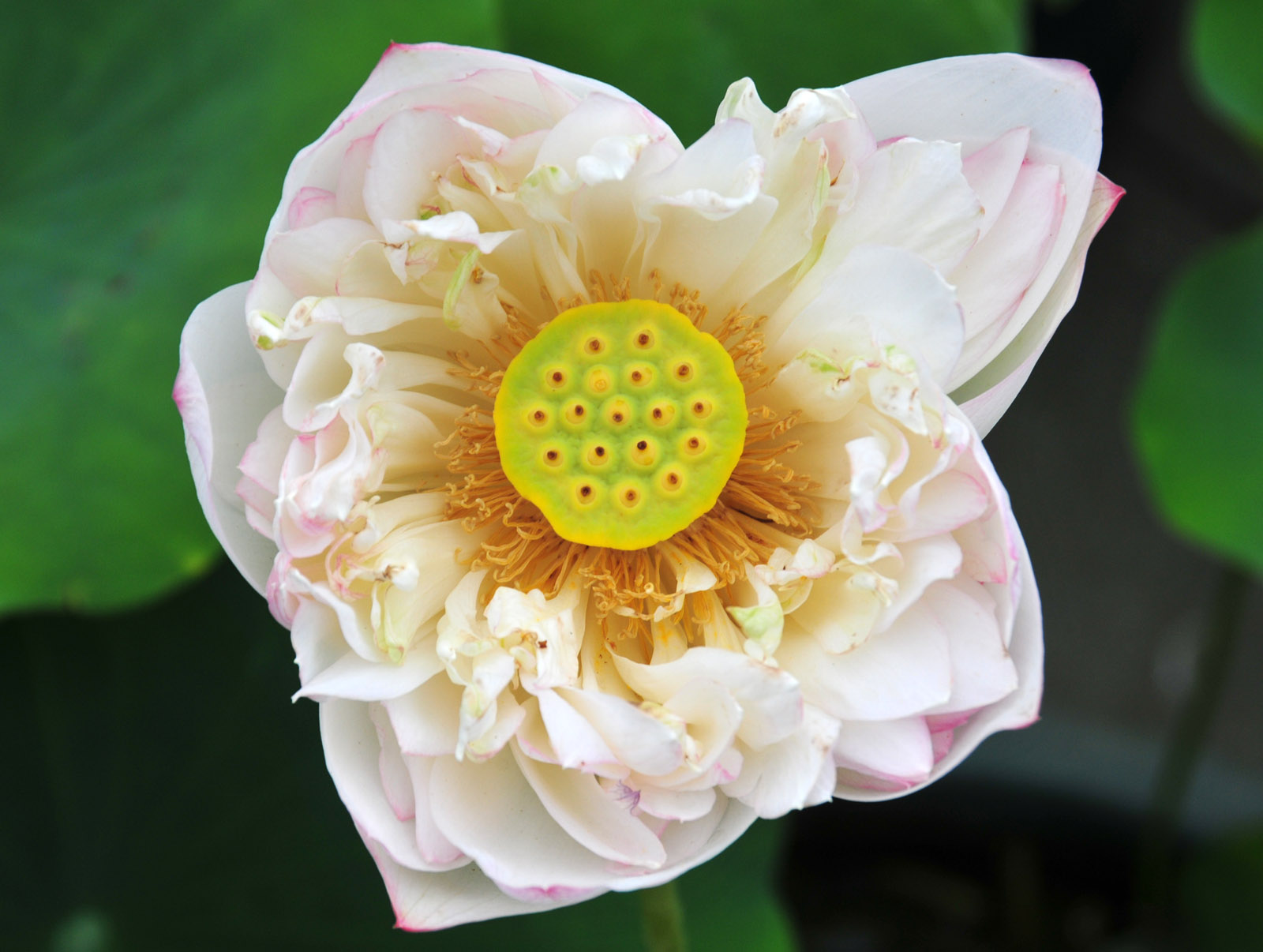

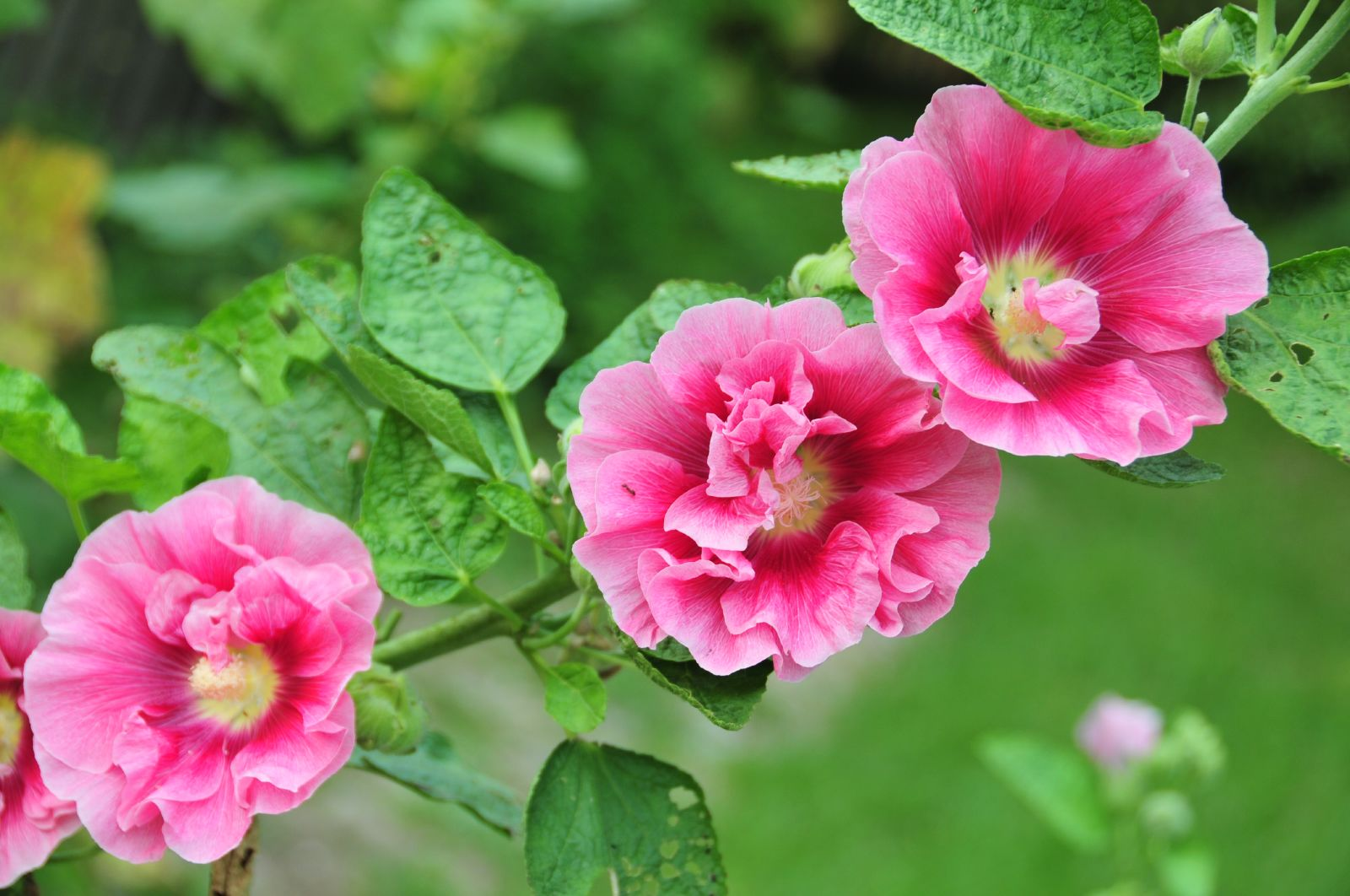

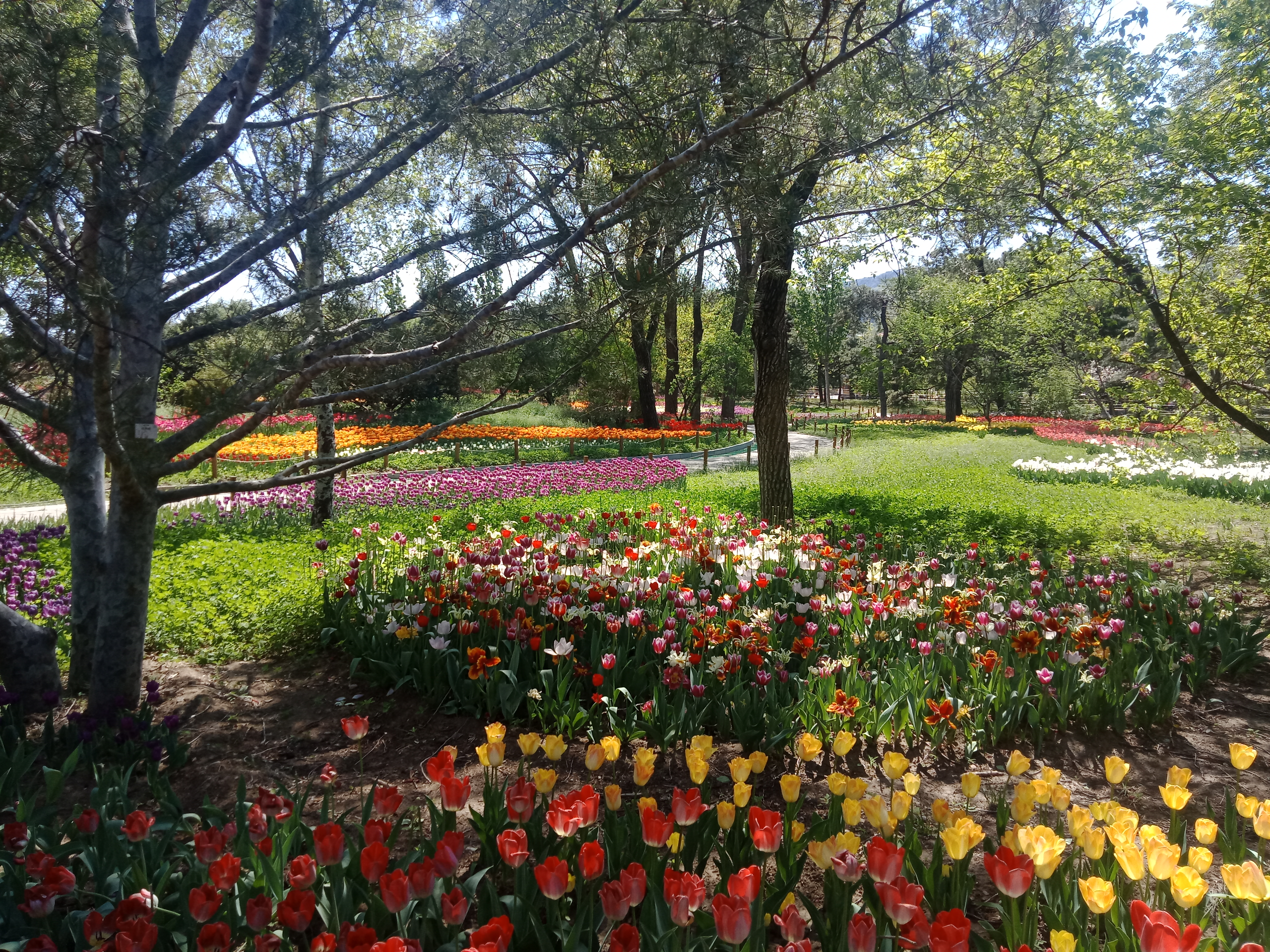

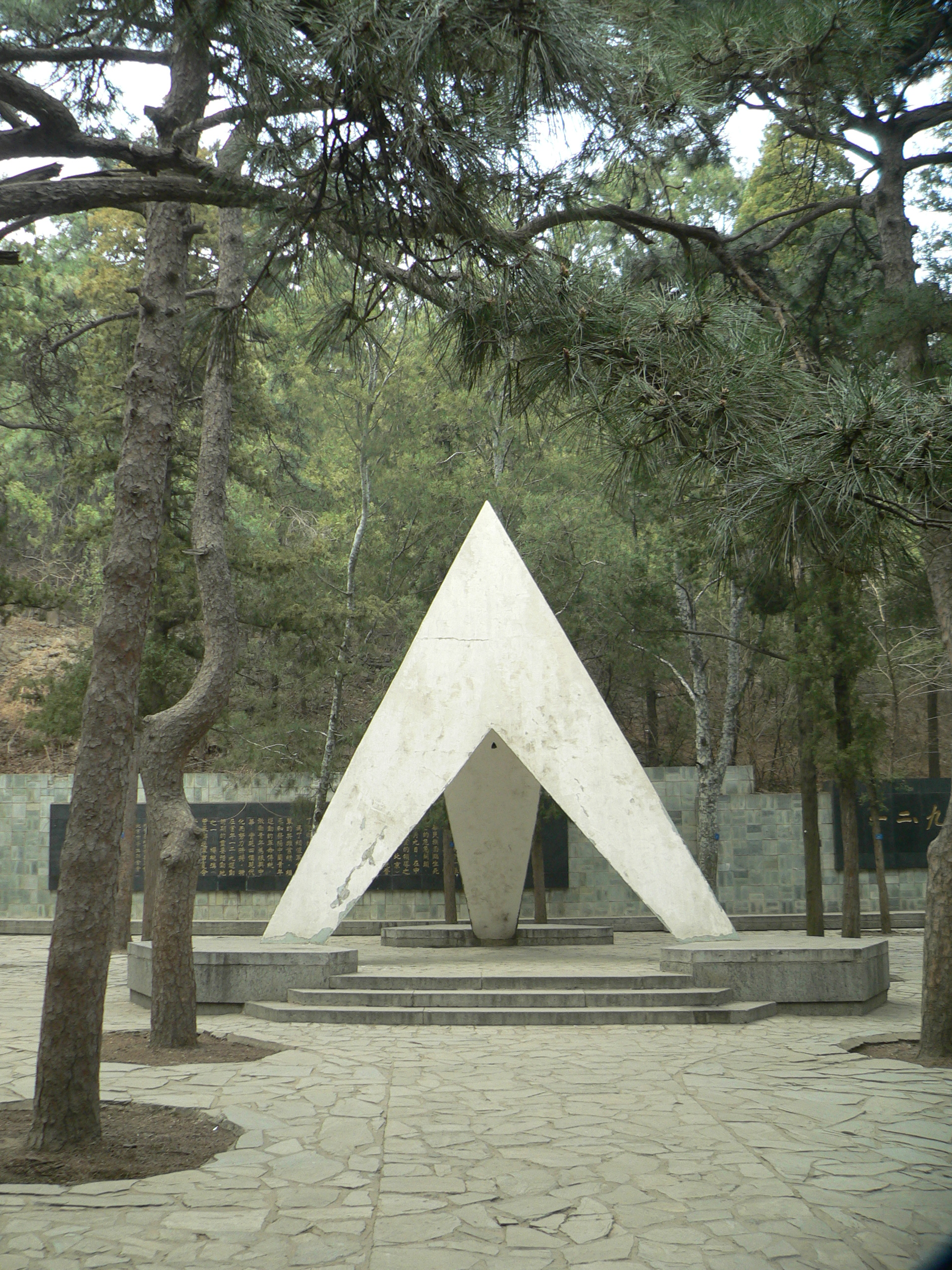
Memorial to the December 9th Movement of 1935.

== Transport ==
- China National Botanical Garden station on Xijiao line.

== See also ==
- South China National Botanical Garden
- List of botanical gardens in China
- List of Chinese gardens
