= JSE =

JSE may refer to:

- JSE Limited or Johannesburg Stock Exchange
- Jacksepticeye, Irish YouTuber
- Jamaica Stock Exchange
- James-Stein estimator
- Java Platform, Standard Edition
- Journal of Scientific Exploration
- Journal of Sports Economics
- Journal of Statistics Education
- Journal of Structural Engineering
- Journal of Systematics and Evolution
- JSE Skikda, Algerian handball club
