= Guangdong Tree Park =

Arboretum in Guangzhou, China

The Guangdong Tree Park (Chinese: 广东树木公园) located in Guangzhou is an arboretum managed by the Guangdong Academy of Forestry. The park is home to over 1,100 species of trees including 56 kinds of nationally protected species of trees and 12 provincially protected species of trees. The park covers 20 hectares of land in the Longdong section of Tianhe district and is nearby to the South China Botanical Garden.
