= M. sinica =

M. sinica may refer to:

- Macaca sinica, the Toque macaque, a reddish-brown coloured Old World monkey species endemic to Sri Lanka
- Manglietia sinica, a plant species endemic to China
