= List of botanical gardens in China =

This List of botanical gardens and arboretums in China is intended to include all significant botanical gardens and arboretums in China. Botanical gardens in China have collections consisting entirely of China native and endemic species; most have a collection that include plants from around the world. There are botanical gardens and arboreta in all provincial-level administration of China, most are administered by local governments, some are privately owned.

- China National Botanical Garden, Haidian District, Beijing
- South China National Botanical Garden, Guangzhou
- Qinling National Botanical Garden, Zhouzhi County, Xi'an, Shaanxi
- Xi'an Botanical Garden, Qujiang New District, Xi'an, Shaanxi
- Hong Kong Zoological and Botanical Gardens
- Shenyang Botanical Garden, Liaoning
- Nanjing Botanical Garden, Memorial Sun Yat-Sen, Jiangsu
- Xishuangbanna Tropical Botanical Garden, Yunnan
- Lijiang High-Alpine Botanical Garden, Yunnan
- Wuhan Botanical Garden, Hubei
- Lushan Botanical Garden, Mount Lu, Jiujiang, Jiangxi
- Chenshan Botanical Garden, Shanghai
- Lanzhou Botanical Garden, Lanzhou
- Ruili Botanical Garden, Yunnan
- Fairy Lake Botanical Garden, Shenzhen, Guangdong
- The Plum Garden, Lake Tai, Jiangsu
- Coloane Arboretum, Macau
- Xiamen Botanical Gardens, Fujian

== See also ==
- List of Chinese gardens
- Chinese garden
