= Hu Xiansu =

Chinese botanist and polymath (1894–1968)

- 胡先骕
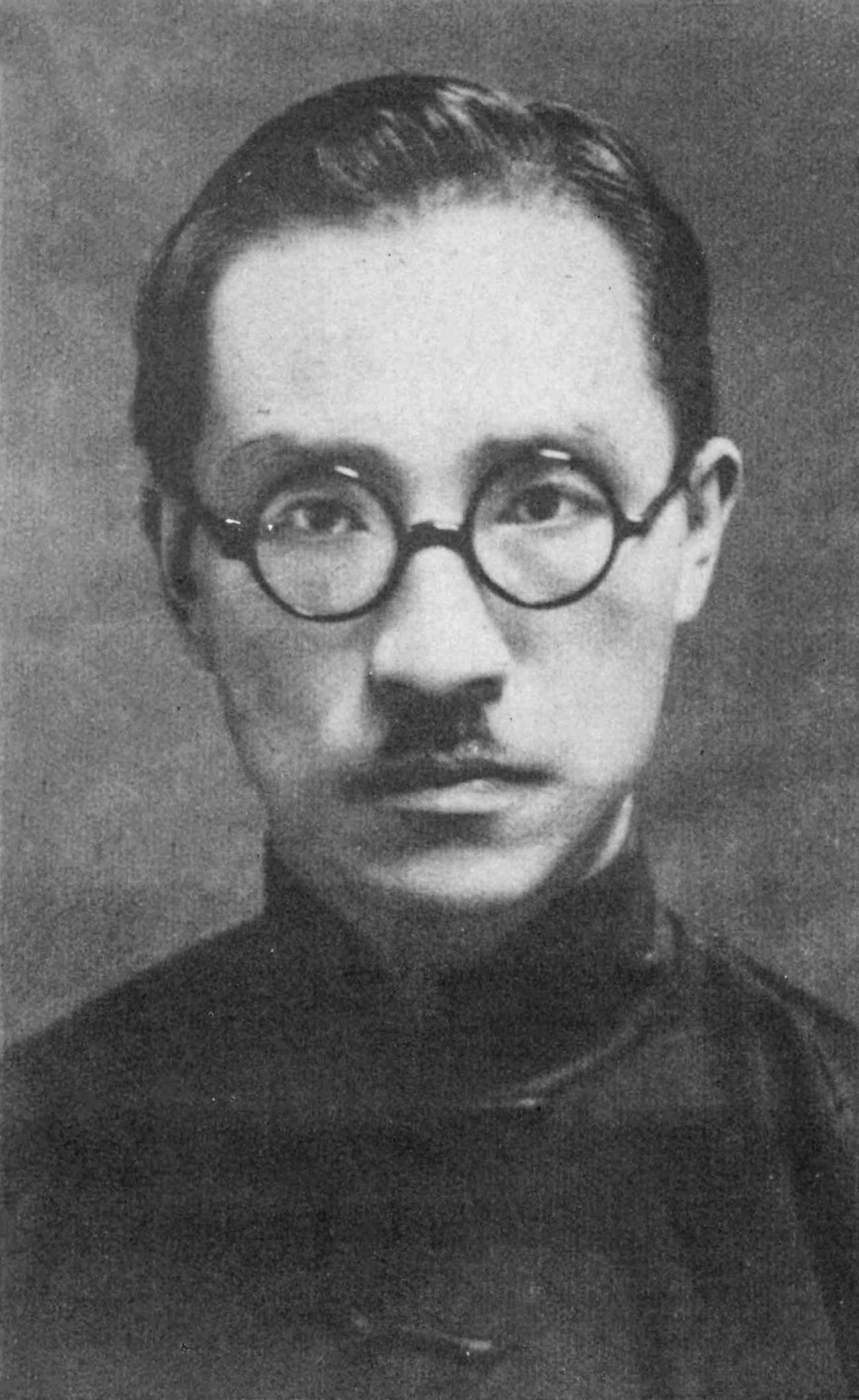
- Hu in 1940
- Born: 24 May 1894; Nanchang, Jiangxi, Qing China
- Died: 16 July 1968 (aged 74); Beijing, People's Republic of China
- Resting place: Mount Lu, Jiangxi
- Education: Imperial University of Peking; University of California (B.Sc.); Harvard University (Sc.D)
- Known for: Pioneer of botany and plant taxonomy in China
- Children: 6
- Scientific career
- Fields: Biology; Botany; Paleobotany; Plant taxonomy
- Workplaces: Nanjing University; Science Society of China; Botanical Society of China; Fan Memorial Institute of Biology; Southeast University; Academia Sinica; Peking University; Beijing Normal University; Lushan Botanical Garden; Jiangxi Normal University
- Doctoral advisor: John George Jack
- Notable students: Yang Weiyi; Chen Fenghuai; Wan-Chun Cheng; Tang Yao; Te-tsun Yu; Cai Xitao; Wang Wencai
- Author abbrev. (botany): Hu

Chinese name
- Traditional Chinese: 胡先驌
- Simplified Chinese: 胡先骕
Transcriptions
Standard Mandarin
- Hanyu Pinyin: Hú Xiānsù
- Wade–Giles: Hu Hsien-hsu
- IPA: [xǔ ɕian sû]

Courtesy name
- Chinese: 步曾
- Literal meaning: Following the steps of great-grandfather
Transcriptions
Standard Mandarin
- Hanyu Pinyin: Bùzēng

Art name
- Traditional Chinese: 懺庵
- Simplified Chinese: 忏庵
Transcriptions
Standard Mandarin
- Hanyu Pinyin: Chàn'ān
- IPA: [ʈʂʰan an]

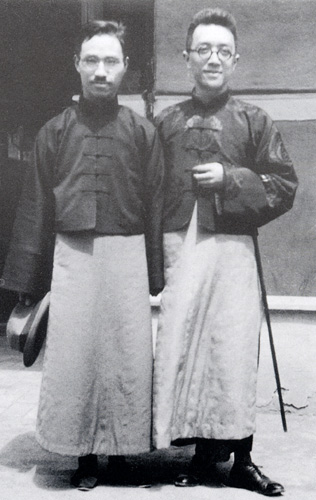
Hu Xiansu and Hu Shih in 1925, Hu Shih titled this picture "the nemesis friends" due to the friendship between the pair despite disagreements over culture and politics.

Hu Xiansu or Hu Hsen-Hsu (24 May 1894 – 16 July 1968), courtesy name Buzeng, art name Chan'an, was a Chinese botanist and polymath. He was the founder of modern botany in China, and a pioneer of paleobotany in the country. His most notable scientific achievement was the identification of the living fossil Metasequoia glyptostroboides (dawn redwood) in 1948, widely considered as one of the greatest botanical discoveries of the 20th century.

Outside botany, Hu also made significant contributions in the field of literary criticism and education. In 1922, in opposition to the New Culture Movement, he co-founded The Critical Review (Xueheng), a major Chinese-language journal which advocated the preservation of classical Chinese literature. He also led the Xueheng School. From 1940 to 1944, he served as the inaugural president of National Chung Cheng University, which is now primarily (Note: Both Nanchang University and Jiangxi Agricultural University claim partial heritage of the National Chung Cheng University) Jiangxi Normal University. Targeted as an intellectual during the Cultural Revolution, he endured repeated struggle sessions, the harm and stress of which likely contributed to his fatal heart attack in Beijing on 16 July 1968.

The standard author abbreviation Hu is used to indicate this person as the author when citing a botanical name.

== Early life ==
Hu Xiansu was born on 24 May 1894 (20th of the fourth month in the lunar calendar) in Nanchang, (Note: Hu's ancestral home is in Xinjian (Now Xinjian District, Nanchang) and he considered himself as native to there for the duration of his life.) Jiangxi, to Hu Chengbi and Chen Caizhi into a family with a lineage of scholar-officials. Hu's great-grandfather Hu Jiayu was an influential high-official in the Qing Court. Hu Xiansu was given the courtesy name of Buzeng ('Following the steps of great-grandfather') by his father, indicated his family's desire for Hu to emulate his great-grandfather's success; but by then, the large family was already in decline. After Hu's father died when he was eight, his family fell into further financial difficulties.

Considered a prodigy, Hu read the Three Character Classic and the Thousand Character Classic at the age of three, and knew thousands of characters; at four, he started to learn the Analects and knew more than ten thousand characters. The early education of Confucian classics and traditional literature deeply shaped Hu's lifelong view on the value of literature and morals.

== Education ==
Hu attempted his first imperial examination in 1904 at age 10, but the examination was abolished soon after in 1905. Hu went to the Hongdu Middle School in Nanchang in 1906 to start his modern education. Hu studied a preparatory course at the Imperial University of Peking (now Peking University) in 1909. In October 1911, the Xinhai Revolution overthrew the Qing dynasty, discontinuing the operations of the university and ending Hu's studies there.

Hu went to the United States in December 1912 and enrolled in the University of California (now University of California, Berkeley). During his years in Berkeley, Hu became an active member of the newly founded Science Society of China and joined the editorial board of the Society's journal Science. At the same time, Hu read English literature extensively.

In 1914, Hu began to correspond with fellow Peking University alumni Hu Shih, developing a lifelong friendship. In May 1916, Hu graduated with honours in botany and became members of the honour societies of Sigma Xi and Phi Beta Kappa. In 1918, he became a faculty member of Nanking Higher Teacher's School (now mainly Nanjing University).

Hu went to the United States again in 1923 and studied in Arnold Arboretum of Harvard University, receiving his doctorate in 1925. His doctoral dissertation, (Note: Synopsis of Chinese Genera of Phaenogams with Descriptions of Representative Species) under the supervision of dendrologist John George Jack, was the first comprehensive survey of plants in the whole of China.

== Career ==
In 1920 and 1921, Hu conducted large-scale plant collections in Zhejiang, Jiangxi and Fujian. In 1921, Hu and zoologist Ping Chih founded the Department of Biology in the National Southeast University, the first biology department in Chinese public universities. (Note: Previously, only missionary universities in China had biology departments) In 1922, Hu, Ping, and Yang Xingfo founded the Institute of Biology of the Science Society of China, the first biological research institute in China; he became a full-time research fellow at the institute in 1926, after resigning from the National Southeast University.

In 1923, Hu along with colleagues Zou Bingwen and Sung Shu Chien published the college-level textbook Advanced Botany, the first such textbook compiled by Chinese scholars. It became widely used in universities around China.

In 1928, Hu moved to Beijing and co-founded the Fan Memorial Institute of Biology. The Fan Institute was named after Fan Yuan-Lien, an important educator and philanthropist. With long-term financial support from the China Foundation for the Promotion of Education and Culture, the Fan Institute developed into a major scientific institute in China. Hu directed the botanical branch of the Fan Institute and from 1932 served as the director of the Institute until 1949. Meanwhile, he taught part-time in the biology departments of Peking University and Beijing Normal University.

In 1933, Hu played a leading role in the founding of the Botanical Society of China, serving as its second president.

In 1934, Hu founded the Lushan Forest Botanical Garden in Jiujiang, Jiangxi. Through Hu's influence, the Lushan Forest Botanical Garden established wide exchange networks with botanical gardens and research institutes around the world. In 1936, fearing for the likelihood of a potential outbreak of war in northern China, Hu established the Yunnan Institute of Agriculture and Forest (Note: Later renamed Kunming Institute of Botany, Chinese Academy of Sciences) in southwestern China.

Between 1938 and 1940, Hu co-authored The Miocene Flora of Shandong Province, China with Ralph W. Chaney; it was the first work investigating China's Cenozoic fossil plants, and is considered the cornerstone of current knowledge of Asian Cenozoic plants.

Between 1940 and 1944, he served as the inaugural president (chancellor) of the National Chung Cheng University, now primarily Jiangxi Normal University, with both Nanchang University and Jiangxi Agricultural University claiming partial heritage.

== Taxonomic naming ==
Over his career, Hu published 2 new families, 17 new genus, and 408 new species of modern plants, and 87 new species of fossil plants. Notably, the genus Sinojackia published in 1928, which was named after Hu's Harvard advisor John George Jack, was the first genus ever described by a Chinese botanist. Similarly, the new family Torricelliaceae, published in 1934, was the first new plant family described by a Chinese botanist.

=== Identification of dawn redwood ===
In the 1940s, Hu and Wan-Chun Cheng identified the modern existence of the genus Metasequoia in Sichuan, which was previously thought to have been extinct for over 150 million years. Hu initially coined the new species Metasequoia viva, before ultimately naming the newly discovered species the glyptostroboides, the dawn redwood. The name of this species was derived from its resemblance to Glyptostrobus, the Chinese swamp cypress.

== Later career ==
As the eve of communist victory over mainland China, Hu declined the opportunity to move to Taiwan with the Nationalist government, and instead stayed in Beijing. In 1949, the Fan Memorial Institute of Biology became the Institute of Plant Taxonomy (later the Institute of Botany), Chinese Academy of Sciences. Hu, no longer serving any leadership roles, served as a researcher at the institute for the rest of his life. In later stage of his career, Hu published two textbooks of plant taxonomy, three plant manuals, and dozens of research papers. Hu also resumed composing Ci poetry and complied a selection of his traditional style poems of his life.

=== Opposition to Lysenkoism ===
In the 1950s, Soviet agronomist Trofim Lysenko's pseudoscientific, anti-Mendelian doctrines in genetics known as Lysenkoism dominated biological science and agricultural practices in China. Mendelian doctrine and its practitioners were heavily persecuted. Despite this environment, Hu was openly critical of Lysenkoism, being the first major academic in China to publicly denounce it as pseudoscience. After refusing to publicly apologise and rescind the statements against Lysenkoism, Hu was publicly denounced by the state, and the textbook which he wrote containing related material was banned. Later on, Hu was not elected as an Academician to the Chinese Academy of Sciences despite his contributions to Chinese sciences, something partially attributed to his opposition to Lysenkoism.

== Death and legacy ==
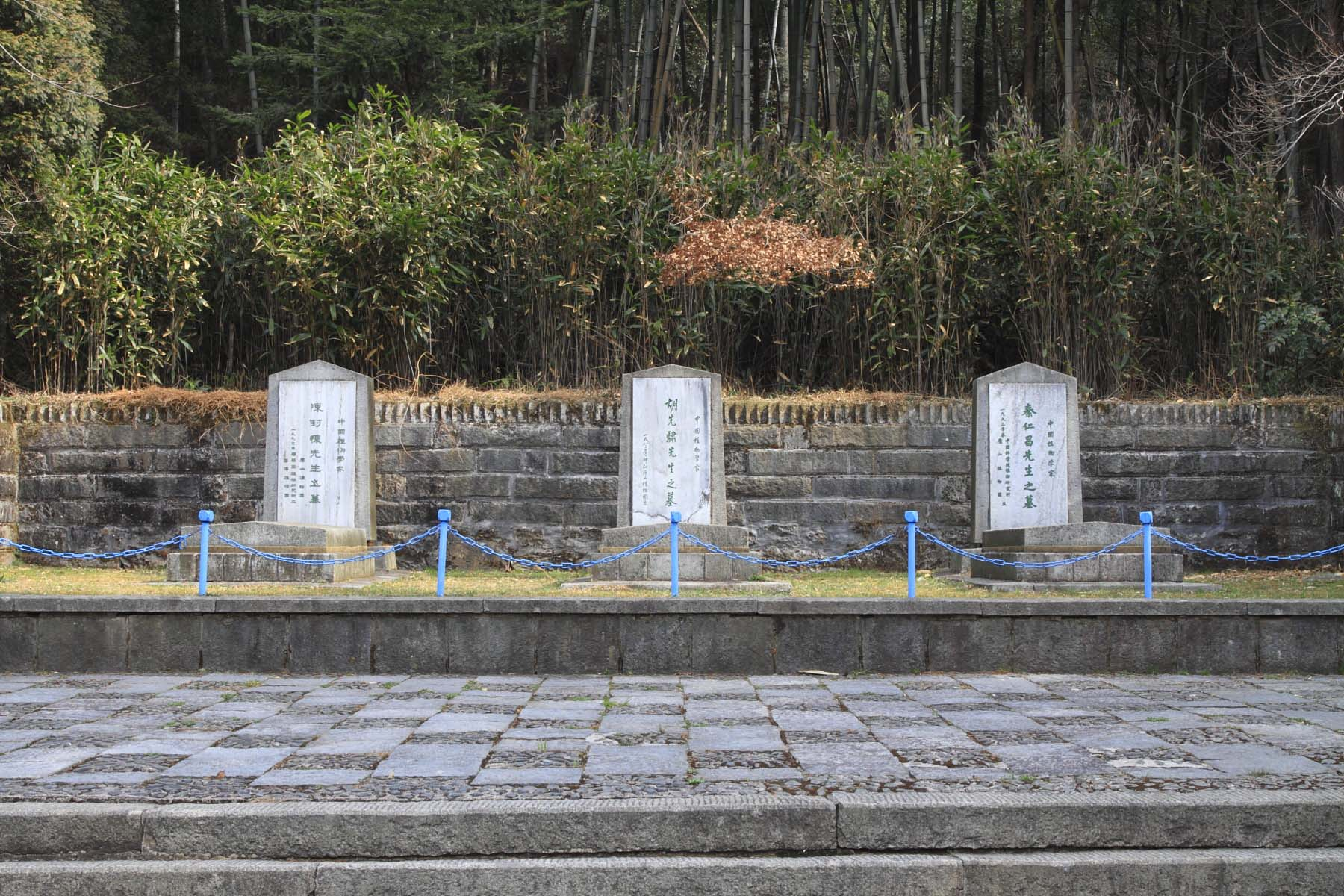
"Three Founders tomb", burial site of Chen Fenghuai (left), Hu Xiansu (center) and Ren-Chang Ching (right) at the Lushan Botanical Garden

In May 1968, during the midst of the Cultural Revolution, Hu's workplace informed him that his salary had been suspended. His home was repeatedly ransacked; the books, calligraphy, and paintings he had collected throughout his lifetime were confiscated by the workplace.

As an intellectual, one of the groups targeted during the Cultural Revolution, Hu endured repeated struggle sessions, in which he was ordered to wear a Kuomintang flag to signify his past relation. On 15 July, he was notified to go to his workplace the next day to attend extended struggle sessions, the stress that the news caused on Hu was massive; in the early morning of 16 July 1968, Hu was found dead on his bed, having suffered a heart attack.

Hu's funeral was held in the Babaoshan Revolutionary Cemetery on 15 May 1979, during which academics and officials from across the country came to pay their respects, and Hu's workplace posthumously reinstated his suspended salary. He was buried at the Metasequoia forest in the Pine and Cypress district of the Lushan Botanical Garden at Mount Lu on 15 May 1984. In the aftermath of his death, interest towards Hu's works reduced. In the 1990s, interest in Hu's works reemerged. Hu's life-long writing is compiled into the 19 volume of H.H.Hu: Complete Works, published by the Jiangxi People's Press in 2024.

Hu is considered one of the foremost contributors to Chinese sciences in the 20th century. The discovery of the Metasequoia glyptostroboides in particular is considered one of the most significant in botany within the 20th century. Hu helmed the effort advocating the creation of a national botanical garden in China, which would eventually become the China National Botanical Garden, earning him the title "father" of the project upon its eventual completion in 2022.
