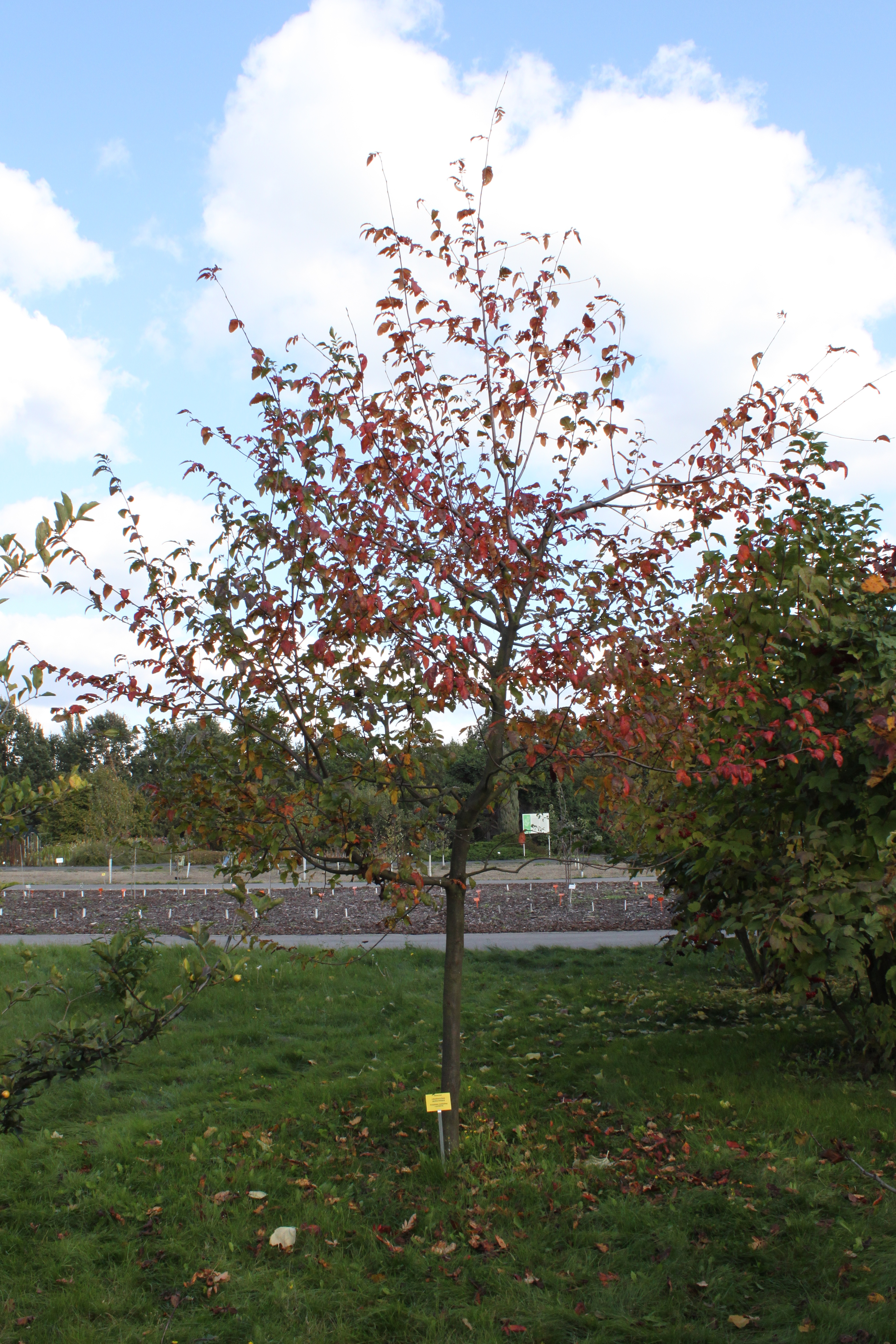
- Here labeled as × Amelasorbus raciborskiana

Scientific classification
- Kingdom: Plantae
- Clade: Tracheophytes
- Clade: Angiosperms
- Clade: Eudicots
- Clade: Rosids
- Order: Rosales
- Family: Rosaceae
- Subfamily: Amygdaloideae
- Tribe: Maleae
- Subtribe: Malinae
- Genus: × Amelasorbus; Rehder
- Species: × A. jackii

Binomial name
- × Amelasorbus jackii Rehder

= × Amelasorbus =

Genus of flowering plants

× Amelasorbus is a flowering plant in the family Rosaceae. A naturally occurring hybrid, it is the result of a cross between two distinct tree genera, Amelanchier and Sorbus, and shows phenotypic similarities to both parents. This type of intergeneric hybrid is quite rare, and is indicated by a multiplication symbol before the name. The name Amelasorbus is an example of a portmanteau word, a combination of the two parents' names.

== Species ==
There is only one accepted species, × Amelasorbus jackii, (Jack's amelasorbus) the result of Amelanchier alnifolia × Sorbus scopulina. A specimen was discovered growing in Idaho, and described by Alfred Rehder of the Arnold Arboretum in 1925. Individuals have also been discovered in Oregon. Due to their hybrid nature, they tend to be quite variable, and this had (mis)led authors to describe other species; × Amelasorbus raciborskiana and × Amelasorbus hoseri, which may or may not be synonyms.
