= John George Jack =

American dendrologist

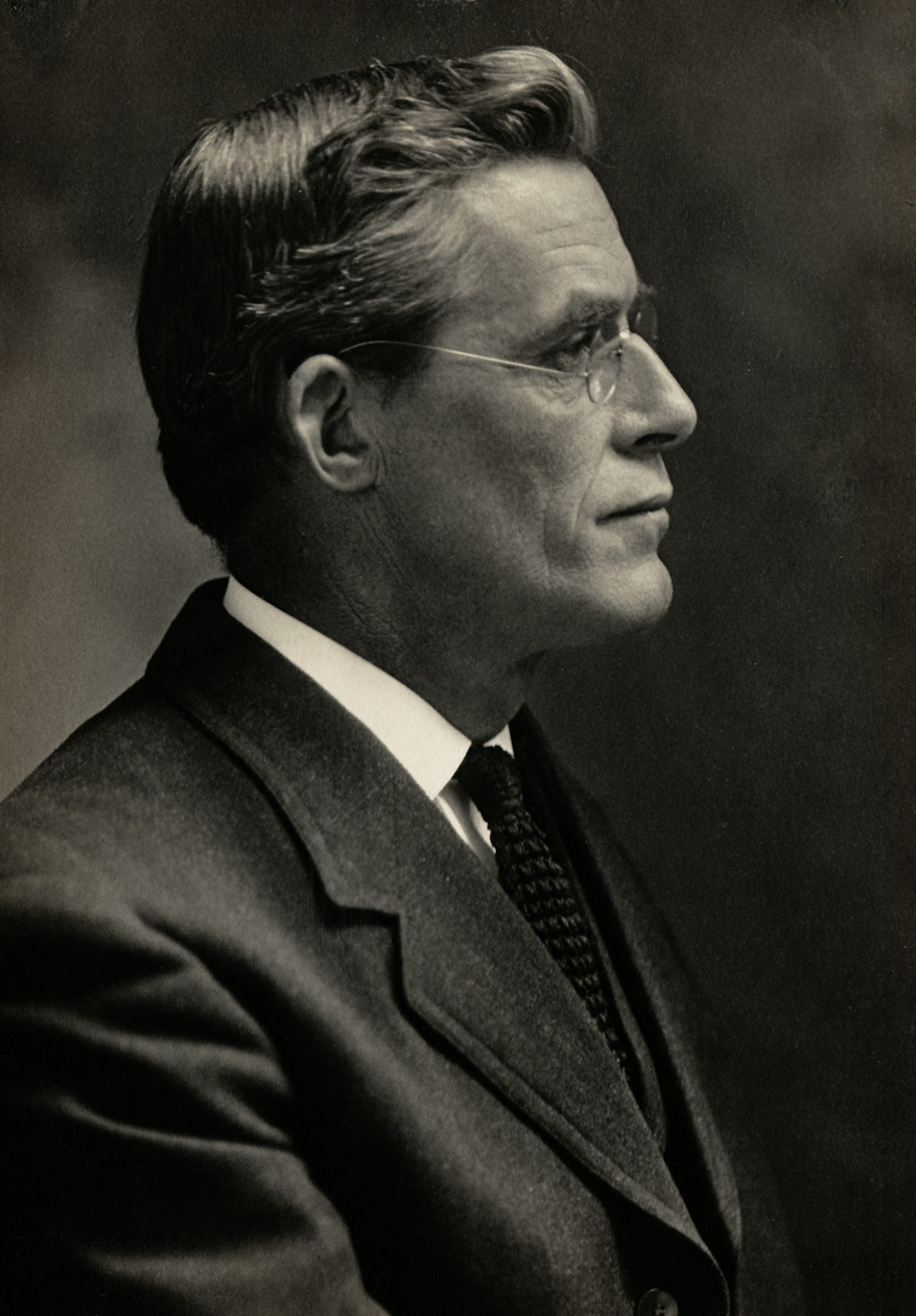
- Profile portrait, c. 1904
- Born: April 15, 1861; Châteauguay, Quebec, Canada
- Died: May 20, 1949 (aged 88); Walpole, Massachusetts, U.S.
- Education: Franklin Academy
- Known for: Early curation and collection building of the Arnold Arboretum; Instruction of early Chinese systematists (Note: Such as Woon Young Chun and H. H. Hu)
- Partner: Cerise Carman (m. 1907; died 1935)
- Children: 2
- Parents: Robert Jack (father); Annie Jack (mother)
- Scientific career
- Fields: Dendrology; Entomology; Forestry; Horticulture
- Workplaces: Arnold Arboretum; Harvard University; Massachusetts Institute of Technology
- Author abbrev. (botany): J.G.Jack

John George Jack (April 15, 1861 – May 20, 1949) was an American dendrologist.

== Biography ==
John Jack was born at Châteauguay, Quebec, Canada on April 15, 1861. The son of Robert and Annie Jack, his father was a blacksmith-turned-farmer of Scottish descent, his mother a horticulturist of English descent who wrote articles under the title Garden News. Jack was educated at his local Protestant school as well as at home with his horticulturalist mother teaching him. His father was also an early botanical influence teaching him about pruning and grafting. His mother was also active in finding him mentors, corresponding with John William Dawson for assistance with this. Dawson would go on to befriend Jack. Jack was later sent to the Franklin Academy as well as another private academy to obtain further education. He spent two winters studying entomology with Dr H. A. Hagen at Harvard, and a summer working in the grounds of Mr E. S. Carmen, publisher of the Rural New Yorker and his future father-in-law, at River Edge, New Jersey.

=== Career ===
In 1886, Jack joined the Arnold Arboretum as a working student under the direction of Professor C. S. Sargent, who recommended Jack's promotion to Lecturer in arboriculture five years later in 1891. During this period, Jack also spent two summers working as an agent of the Geological Survey, and the Department of Agriculture, exploring the forests of Colorado and of the Bighorn Mountains in Wyoming. He went on to serve as an instructor in forestry at Harvard, and as lecturer in forestry at MIT before appointment as assistant professor of Dendrology at the Arnold Arboretum in 1908; he retired in 1935.

Perhaps the earliest "popular classes" offered by American arboreta were the walks around the grounds of the Arnold Arboretum, conducted by J. G. Jack, which have continued and developed into numerous classes for the public.

=== Foreign adventures ===
Jack travelled widely, visiting Europe in 1891, Canada in 1894, and the Far East in 1905, when he returned with seeds of 650 species and varieties of both wild and cultivated plants, many of them new to the United States. Notable introductions included the hardy winter hazel Corylopsis glabrescens, and several rhododendrons including schlippenbachii. In 1926, Jack was asked by Sargent to visit Cuba and collect material for the Arnold Arboretum herbarium from the Atkins Institution plantation at Cienfuegos, a task Jack repeated several times over the next nine years until his compulsory retirement when aged 74.

== Personal life ==
Jack married Cerise Carmen (d.1935), daughter of his former employer Elbert S Carmen, in 1907. They had no children of their own, but adopted two.

== Death ==
In 1948, Jack fell from a ladder and broke his hip while tending his orchard in Walpole, Massachusetts; bedridden thereafter, he died on May 20, 1949, aged 88.

== Eponymy ==
A genus and a number of species were named for Jack:

- Sinojackia Hu, Alnus jackii, Amelasorbus jackii Rehd., Betula jackii Schneid., Crataegus jackii Sarg., Juniperus communis var.jackii Rehd., Populus jackii Sarg., Quercus jackiana Schneid., Rosa maximowiczii var. jackii (Rehd.), Viburnum jackii Rehd.
