= Journal of Systematics and Evolution =

- Discipline: Plant systematics, evolution
- Language: English
- Edited by: Song Ge, Jun Wen

Publication details
- Former name: Acta Phytotaxonomica Sinica
- History: 1963-present
- Publisher: Wiley on behalf of the Botanical Society of China and the Institute of Botany (Chinese Academy of Sciences)
- Frequency: Bimonthly
- Open access: Hybrid
- Impact factor: 4.098 (2020)

Standard abbreviations
- ISO 4: J. Syst. Evol.

Indexing
- ISSN: 1674-4918 (print); 1759-6831 (web)
- LCCN: 2008202482
- OCLC no.: 421347761

Links
- Journal homepage; Online access; Online archive

The Journal of Systematics and Evolution is a bimonthly peer-reviewed scientific journal of botany. It covers all issues related to plant systematics and evolution. It is published by Wiley on behalf of the Botanical Society of China and is sponsored by the Institute of Botany (Chinese Academy of Sciences). The editors-in-chief are Song Ge (Chinese Academy of Sciences) and Jun Wen (Smithsonian Institution). The journal was established in 1963 as Acta Phytotaxonomica Sinica.

== Abstracting and indexing ==
The journal is abstracted and indexed in:

- Biological Abstracts
- BIOSIS Previews
- CAB Abstracts
- Current Contents/Agriculture, Biology & Environmental Sciences
- EBSCO databases
- Science Citation Index Expanded
- Scopus
- The Zoological Record

According to the Journal Citation Reports, the journal has a 2020 impact factor of 4.098.
