= Huang Lusheng =

Huang Lusheng (Chinese: 黄路生; born 1964) is a Chinese animal geneticist and professor of Jiangxi Agricultural University.

== Biography ==
He was born in Shangyou County, Ganzhou, Jiangxi. In 1984 he earned his bachelor of Animal husbandry from Jiangxi Agricultural University, in 1987 he earned his doctor's degree of biochemistry from Russia. 1988 to 2000 he studied and taught at several universities abroad. He developed a very close and successful collaboration with Bertram Brenig (Director of the Institute of Veterinary Medicine, Georg-August-University Goettingen, Germany). Since 2008 he is president of the Jiangxi Agricultural University. In 2011 he was elected as member of the Chinese Academy of Sciences and in 2016 as corresponding member of the Göttingen Academy of Sciences and Humanities.

In the framework of an 8 years project Huang organized the establishment of a genomic DNA depository of endogenous Chinese pig breeds. This DNA depository contains specimens from 24 provinces, municipalities and autonomous regions. His group identified 4 new genes: SCD, PGK2, FUT1, SPAM1, and developed 4 new molecular breeding technologies.
