= Jiangxi Agricultural University =

University in Nanchang, Jiangxi, China

- 江西农业大学
- Motto: 团结，勤奋，求实，创新
- Motto in English: "Unity, Diligence, Truth-seeking, Innovation"
- Type: Public university Research university
- Established: 1905; 121 years ago
- President: Huang Lusheng
- Academic staff: 1800
- Students: 26,000
- Location: Nanchang, Jiangxi, China
- Campus: 1.6 million mu of land for 3,950 acres (16.0 km^{2}) of teaching
- Website: jxau.edu.cn

Jiangxi Agricultural University
- Simplified Chinese: 江西农业大学
- Traditional Chinese: 江西農業大學
Transcriptions
Standard Mandarin
- Hanyu Pinyin: Jiāngxī Nóngyè Dàxué

Jiangxi Agricultural University (JXAU; Chinese: 江西农业大学; pinyin: Jiāngxī Nóngyè Dàxué) is located in the northern suburbs of Nanchang city, the capital city of Jiangxi province. JXAU is a key province-run university and is one of the first universities in China to confer bachelor's and master's degrees.

With 17 colleges, JXAU offers degrees in 60 academic majors. Jiangxi Agricultural University is a high-level agricultural university with distinctive characteristics, featuring strengths in agriculture, a focus on biotechnology, and coordinated development across multiple disciplines.

== History ==
The origins of Jiangxi Agricultural University trace back to the establishment of Jiangxi Industrial School in 1905. In 1908 it was renamed Jiangxi Higher Agricultural School and later evolved through various reorganizations and mergers.

- 1905: Founded as Jiangxi Industrial School , regarded as the earliest agricultural education institution in Jiangxi
- 1908: Renamed Jiangxi Higher Agricultural School
- 1940: Undergraduate education formally began with the founding of National Chung Cheng University College of Agriculture; first principle was the botanist Hu Xiansu
- 1949: Renamed Nanchang University College of Agriculture
- 1952: Merged several agricultural and veterinary departments (including those from Nanchang University, provincial veterinary schools, Henan/Hunan/Guangxi institutions) to form Jiangxi Agricultural College
- 1958: Establishment of Jiangxi Communist Labor University Headquarters
- 1968: Renamed Jiangxi Communist Labor University
- 1969: Merged with Jiangxi Communist Labor University
- 1980 Nov: Renamed Jiangxi Agricultural University
