= National Chung Cheng University (Jiangxi) =

Former university in Jiangxi, China

National Chung Cheng University was a university established in May 1940 within Taihe County, Jiangxi Province, China. In September 1949, it was renamed National Nanchang University. In the 1950s, it was dissolved and its faculties and colleges were merged into Jiangxi Normal University and Jiangxi Agricultural University.

== History ==
In May 1940, the Chinese Ministry of Education allocated one million yuan in Chinese currency to the Jiangxi provincial government. In June, the Jiangxi provincial government established National Chung Cheng University in Xingling Village, Taihe County. In September, the university appointed Hu Hsen-Hsu, a famed botanist and literary scholar, as its first president.

The university's name was derived from the Confucian concept of "great centrality and justice" and also the courtesy name of then Premier of China Chiang Kai-Shek. Its faculties were organised into Colleges of Liberal Arts, Engineering, and Agriculture, with departments in politics, economics, social education, mechanical engineering, civil engineering, chemical engineering, agriculture, forestry, animal husbandry and veterinary medicine, and a Research Department for practical problems.

In 1941, the College of Liberal Arts added a Department of Literature and History, while the College of Agriculture added a Department of Biology. In the autumn of 1942, teacher training and administrative management special programmes were launched. A branch campus was also established in Longling Village, Ganzhao County. In August 1943, a taxation special programme was also opened. The following year, a Civil Engineering Special Programme was added and the Department of Agriculture doubled its intake.

After its establishment, National Chung Cheng University attracted many renowned scholars, including Cai Fangyin as dean of the College of Engineering, Wang Yi as dean of the College of Liberal Arts, and Zhou Shilu as dean of the College of Agriculture.

After the victory over Japan in 1945, National Chung Cheng University relocated to Nanchang. Relocation work began in late October and was completed by December. Classes resumed in January 1946 at Wangchenggang, Nanchang. Approved programmes were expanded to include a College of Science, with new departments in Mathematics, Physics and Chemistry. The original Department of Biology under the College of Agriculture was merged into the College of Science. The Department of Literature and History under the College of Liberal Arts was divided into departments of Chinese Literature, Foreign Languages and Literature, and History.

In September 1949, National Chung Cheng University was renamed National Nanchang University and later incorporated Jiangxi Technical College, Agricultural College, Sports College and Water Conservancy College. In October 1950 it was changed to Nanchang University, with five colleges – Colleges of Politics, Liberal Arts, Science, Engineering and Agriculture and 16 departments. In 1952 the College of Agriculture became independent as Jiangxi Agricultural University.

In 1953, during the nationwide restructuring of higher education, the original Nanchang University was dissolved. Most of its science and engineering faculties were redistributed to 14 universities including Central China University of Science and Technology, South China University of Technology, Central South College of Civil Engineering and Architecture (now part of Hunan University), University of Technology, Central South Sports Institute, Zhongnan University of Economics and Law, Sun Yat-sen University, and Wuhan University. Based on the remaining faculties of Chinese, history, biology, mathematics, physics, chemistry and arts, Jiangxi Normal Institute was established on the original site. Jiangxi Normal Institute inherited all the campuses, most of the libraries, some equipment and one-third of the faculty, most staff and all the workers of Nanchang University.

Jiangxi Normal Institute was not primarily based on a Teacher Training Department since that department did not have its own facilities, libraries, equipment or faculty. In December 1952, most department heads of Jiangxi Normal Institute came from the original Colleges of Liberal Arts and Science of Nanchang University rather than the Teacher Training Department. Jiangxi Normal Institute was renamed Jiangxi Normal University in October 1983.

In 1958 Jiangxi University was established by merging the Biology Department of Jiangxi Normal Institute. In May 1993, Jiangxi University and Jiangxi Industrial University, which was founded in 1958, merged to form the new Nanchang University.

Jiangxi Normal University and Jiangxi Agricultural University are the direct inheritors of National Chung Cheng University, with Jiangxi Normal University inheriting most.
