= Botanical Society of China =

Chinese academic organization

- 中国植物学会
- Abbreviation: BSC
- Formation: 1933; 93 years ago
- Founded at: Beibei, Chongqing, China
- Headquarters: Fragrant Hills, Beijing
- Chairman: Zhong Kang
- Parent organization: China Association for Science and Technology
- Website: http://www.botany.org.cn

The Botanical Society of China (Chinese: 中国植物学会; pinyin: Zhōngguó zhíwù xuéhuì) is a non-profit academic organization that promotes the development of botany in China. Located in Beijing, It was founded in 1933 and is the oldest and largest botanical society in China. The society has over 4,000 members, including botanists from all over the country.

The Botanical Society is a member of the International Association for Plant Taxonomy and the International Union of Biological Sciences.

== History ==
The Botanical Society of China is founded in 1933 in Beibei, Chongqing. There were 19 founders in total, including Hu Xiansu and Ren-Chang Ching.

The Second Sino-Japanese War and the subsequent resumption of the Chinese civil war reduced the activities of the society, gradually recovering thereafter. The Cultural Revolution again halted the society's activities for 12 years, resuming activities in 1978. As of 2024 the society has over 16,000 members.

== Activities ==
The society's stated mission is to "promote the understanding, conservation, and sustainable use of plant resources." It works to achieve its mission by organising academic conferences, publishing journals and books on botany, promoting the conservation of plant resources, providing education and training to young botanists, and collaborating with international botanical societies.

The Botanical Society of China's activities include organising academic conferences and symposia, publishing journals and books on botany, promoting the conservation of plant resources, providing education and training to young botanists, and collaborating with international botanical societies.
