= Lushan Botanical Garden =

Botanical garden in China

- 庐山植物园
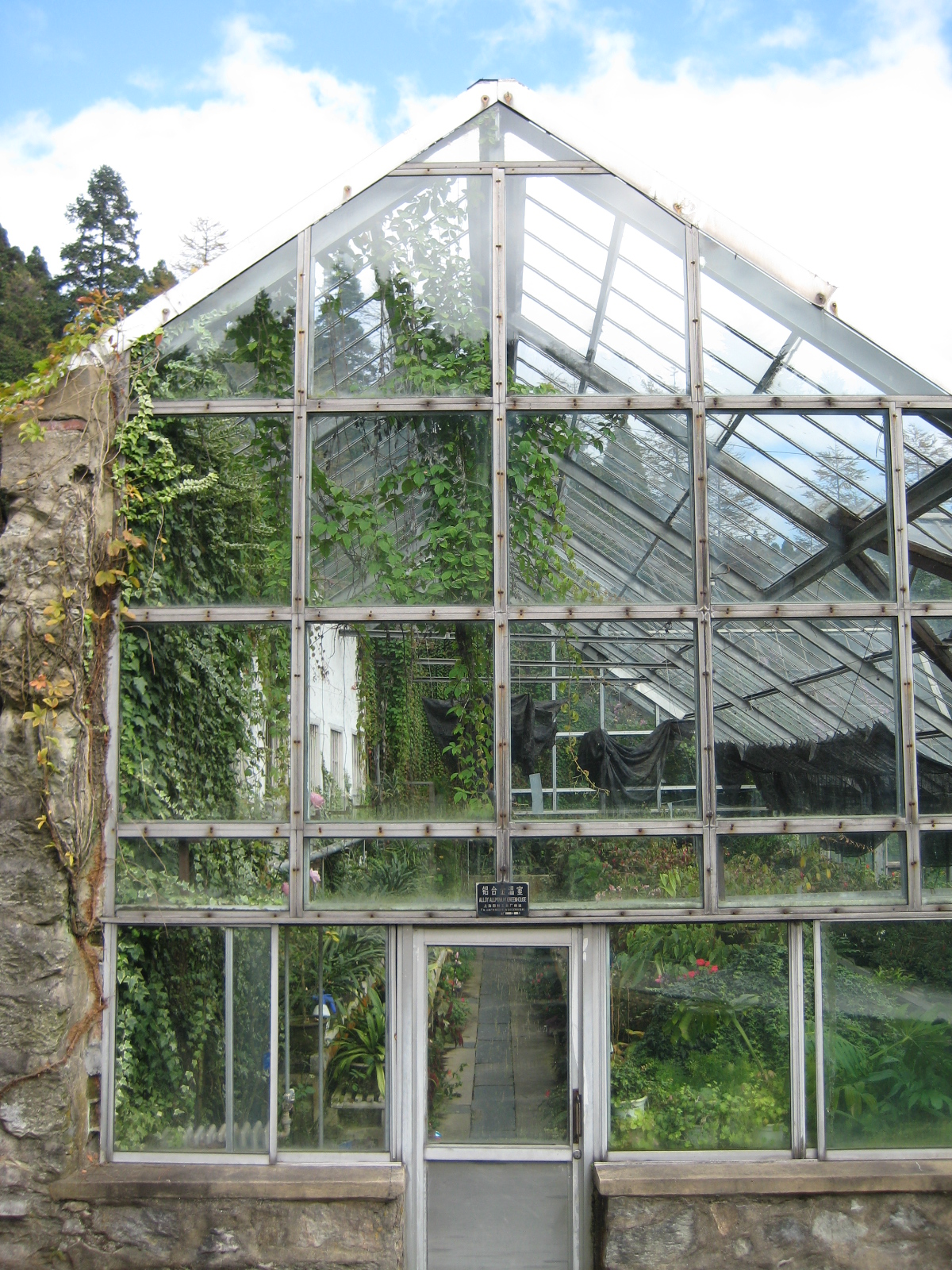
- Greenhouse in the Lushan Botanical Garden

- Location within Eastern China Location within China
- Type: Botanical garden
- Location: Mount Lu, Jiangxi, China
- Coordinates: 29°33′00″N 115°58′55″E
- Area: ≈300 hectares (740 acres)
- Opened: 1934
- Website: Official website

Lushan Botanical Garden (Chinese: 庐山植物园; pinyin: Lúshān zhíwùyuán), officially Lushan Botanical Garden, Chinese Academy of Sciences, is a botanical garden located within Mount Lu of Jiujiang, Jiangxi province, China. It is the first subtropical mountain botanical garden in China. It was founded on 20 August 1934 by Hu Hsen-Hsu, Ren-Chang Ching, and Chen Fenghuai, under the name Lushan Forest Botanical Garden. Since its founding, its affiliation and name has gone through several changes. Currently, it is under the administration of the Chinese Academy of Sciences and is composed of 13 special parks and is about 300 hectares (740 acres) in size, with over 5,000 species of plants, along with 170,000 specimens and over 5,000 plant taxa.

Lushan Botanical Garden is famous for its gymnosperm collection, which had been introduced from 15 countries. There are more than 200 species of Gymnosperms from 11 families and 41 genera within its Pinales special park.

Lushan Botanical Garden is a member of Botanic Gardens Conservation International (BGCI) and the Initiative for Collective Conservation in Chinese Botanical Gardens (ICCBG).

The botanical garden currently hosts 140 staff, including 43 doctors and 40 master's degree holders, being mainly from Nanchang University. The garden hosts 800,000 tourists annually.

Within the Botanical Garden also resides the locations for the tomb of Chen Yinke and the "Three Founders tomb" (Hu Hsen-Hsu, Ren-Chang Ching, and Chen Fenghuai), both of which are protected cultural relics.
