= Annie Jack =

Canadian writer

Annie L. Jack
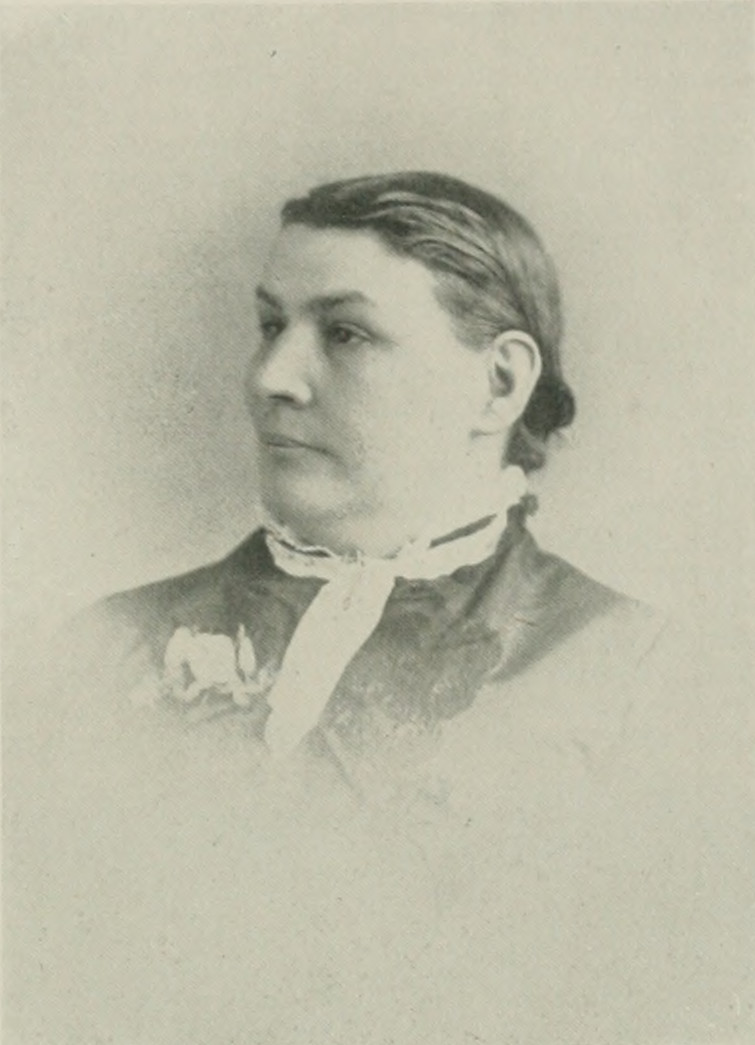
- Annie Jack photographed by William Notman
- Born: Annie Linda Hayr; January 1, 1839; King's Cliffe, Northamptonshire, England
- Died: February 15, 1912 (aged 73); Châteauguay, Québec, Canada
- Known for: Writer, Horticulturist

Annie Linda Jack (1 January 1839 – 15 February 1912) (née Hayr) was a Canadian writer. She was the first Canadian professional female garden writer.

== Biography ==
Annie Jack was born in Northamptonshire, England, to John Hayr on 1 January 1839. In 1852, Annie Linda Hayr moved to Troy, New York, where she attended Troy Female Seminary. She married the Scottish-born fruit farmer, Robert Jack, and settled at his farm, "Hillside," in Châteauguay, Quebec.

At Hillside, over the next fifty years Annie Jack raised 11 children while also developing and maintaining her garden. Upon her marriage, she had stipulated for one acre of land to be devoted to any department of horticulture she chose, the profits to be her own pocket-money. She wrote about her experiences in The Rural New Yorker under the title " A Woman's Acre". The American horticulturalist Liberty Hyde Bailey referred to Jack's garden as "one of the most original gardens I know". Her husband died in April 1900.

Jack was the author of the column on flowers and fruit "Garden Talks" in the Montreal Daily Witness, the success of which led to her book The Canadian Garden: A Pocket Help for the Amateur (1903). It was the first Canadian book on gardening and remained the only such book available until after World War I, when Dorothy Perkins published Canadian Gardening Book (1918).

She contributed to the Canadian Horticulturalist and she also wrote stories and poems for various newspapers and magazines including "Women's Work in New Channels," for Harper's Young People. In 1902 she published a volume on the life of the French Canadian habitant called The Little Organist of St. Jerome, and Other Stories.
