= Ren-Chang Ching =

Chinese botanist

- Born: 15 February 1898; Wujin, Jiangsu, Qing dynasty
- Died: 22 July 1986 (aged 88); Beijing, China
- Resting place: Lushan Botanical Garden, Jiujiang
- Other name: Qin Renchang
- Education: University of Nanjing
- Scientific career
- Fields: Botany
- Institutions: Academia Sinica; Chinese Academy of Sciences
- Academic advisors: John George Jack
- Author abbrev. (botany): Ching

Chinese name
- Chinese: 秦仁昌
Transcriptions
Standard Mandarin
- Hanyu Pinyin: Qín Rénchāng
- Wade–Giles: Ch'in Jen-ch'ang

Courtesy name
- Traditional Chinese: 子農
- Simplified Chinese: 子农
Transcriptions
Standard Mandarin
- Hanyu Pinyin: Zǐnóng

Ren-Chang Ching (Chinese: 秦仁昌; pinyin: Qín Rénchāng; 15 February 1898 – 22 July 1986), courtesy name Zinong, was a Chinese botanist and pteridologist who made significant collections of plants from Mongolia to Yunnan.

== Life and work ==
Ren was born in Wujin, Jiangsu, and studied botany and forestry at the University of Nanjing. On graduating in 1925 he taught at National Southeastern University and from 1927 was Head of the Botany Section, Nanjing Museum. Here he switched his focus from trees to pteridophytes, which thereafter became his speciality. At this time, there were no experts on Chinese ferns in China and no single fern specimen was correctly identified in the small herbarium just started in Beijing. Ching started to correspond with pteridologists in the West (H. Christ, C. Christensen, W. R. Maxon and E. Copeland), thereby creating a basic library on Asiatic ferns for reference. In addition he started to make extensive collections of ferns, particularly from the provinces south of the Yangtze, but he knew he needed to see the type specimens in western herbaria.

Ching attended the Fifth International Botanical Congress in 1930 and subsequently visited western herbariums which held Chinese plants. In Copenhagen, he consulted the fern expert Carl Christensen, and then worked at the Royal Botanic Gardens, Kew, for more than a year. He again visited Copenhagen in 1932 and then Vienna, Prague and other European herbaria before returning to China later that year, where he joined the Fan Memorial Institute of Biology (later Academia Sinica), Beijing. in 1933, Ching was one those who founded the Chinese Botanical Society, and soon afterwards founded the Mountain Lu Botanical Garden in Jiujiang.

When the Japanese invaded China in 1937, Ching fled to Kunming (Yunnan Province), where, working at Yunnan University, he helped to found the Lijiang Botanical Station, where he was director until 1945. Ching remained in Yunnan until 1949, when he returned to Beijing to head the Taxonomic Section in the Institute of Botany, Academia Sinica, where his energies were largely focussed on education and forestry. However, his interest in ferns continued for the rest of his life, with him finally publishing more than 140 papers and books on them. Major works were Icones Filicum Sinicarum (1930-1958) and the series Studies of Chinese Ferns. He was also the principal author of the fern treatments in Flora Republicae Popularis Sinicae.

(This section is essentially a rewrite of the corresponding JSTOR article.)

== Some plants he authored ==
(In the Adiantaceae)
Adiantum annamense Ching—Acta Phytotax. Sin. 6: 315. 1957.
Adiantum breviserratum (Ching) Ching & Y.X.Lin—Acta Phytotax. Sin. 18(1): 104. 1980
Adiantum capillus-veneris L. f. dissectum (M.Martens & Galeotti) Ching—Acta Phytotax. Sin. 6: 344. 1957
Adiantum capillus-veneris L. f. fissum (Christ) Ching—Acta Phytotax. Sin. 6: 343. 1957
Adiantum chienii Ching—Sinensia 1: 50. 1930
Adiantum davidii var. longispinum Ching—Acta Phytotax. Sin. 6: 333. 1957

== Sources ==
- R.C. Ching and Z.H. Wang, 1982, "A Brief Report on the Progress of Pteridological Research in China", American Fern Journal, 72(1): 1-2
- K.S. Shing (ed. A.C. Jermy and A.M. Paul), 1988, "Ching Ren Chang 1898-1986: A Bibliography", Taxon, 37(2): 409-416.
- Brummitt, R.K. & Powell, C.E., Authors Pl. Names (1992): 118; Chaudhri, M.N., Vegter, H.I. & de Bary, H.A., Index Herb. Coll. I-L (1972): 452; Lanjouw, J. & Stafleu, F.A., Index Herb. Coll. A-D (1954): 125, 166; Vegter, H.I., Index Herb. Coll. T-Z (1988): 1045;
