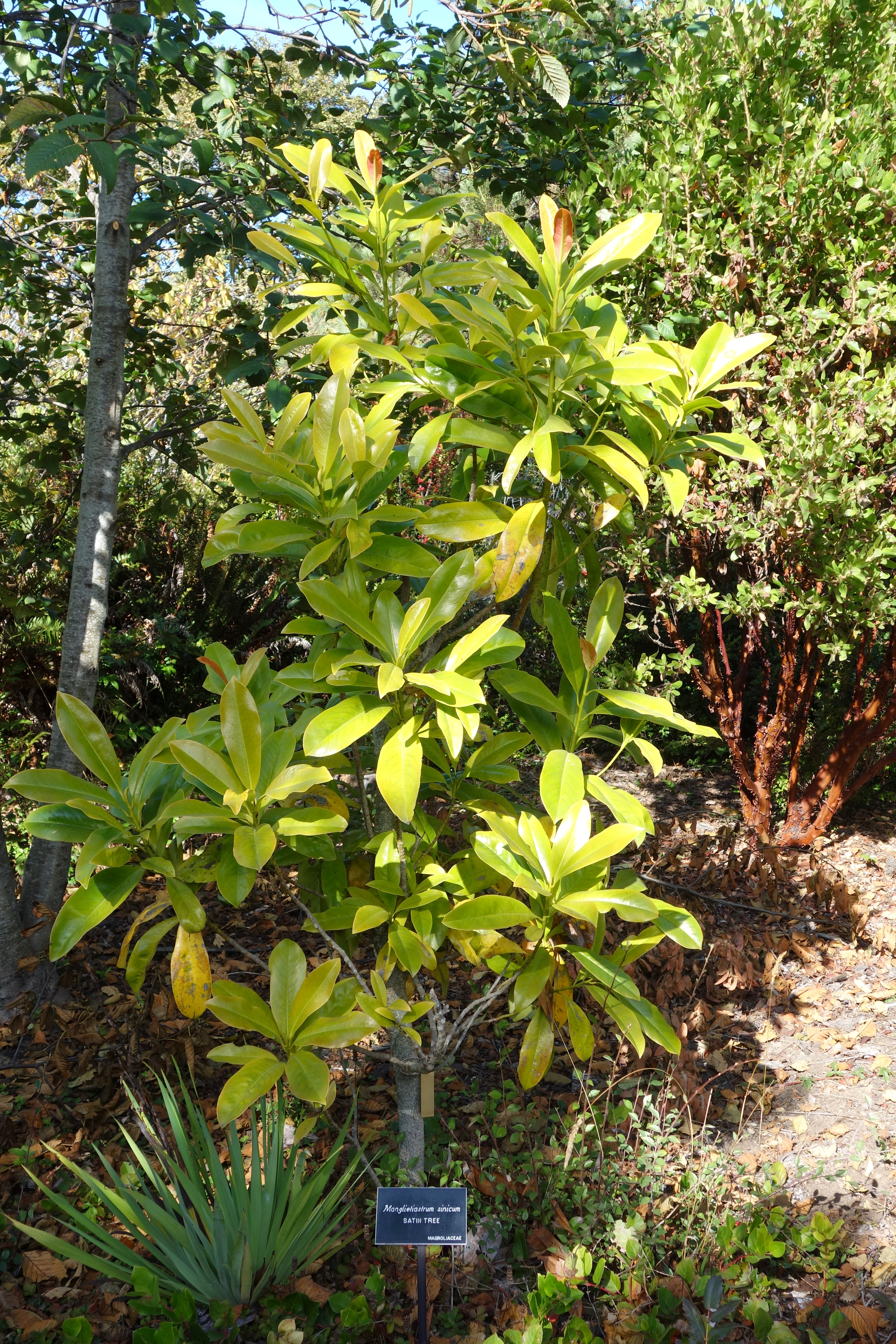
- At Mendocino Coast Botanical Gardens

Conservation status
- Critically Endangered (IUCN 3.1)

Scientific classification
- Kingdom: Plantae
- Clade: Embryophytes
- Clade: Tracheophytes
- Clade: Spermatophytes
- Clade: Angiosperms
- Clade: Magnoliids
- Order: Magnoliales
- Family: Magnoliaceae
- Genus: Magnolia
- Species: M. sinica

Binomial name
- Magnolia sinica (Y.W.Law) Noot.

Synonyms
- Manglietia sinica (Y.W.Law) B.L.Chen & Noot.; Manglietiastrum sinicum Y.W.Law; Pachylarnax sinica (Y.W.Law) N.H.Xia & C.Y.Wu

= Magnolia sinica =

Species of flowering plant

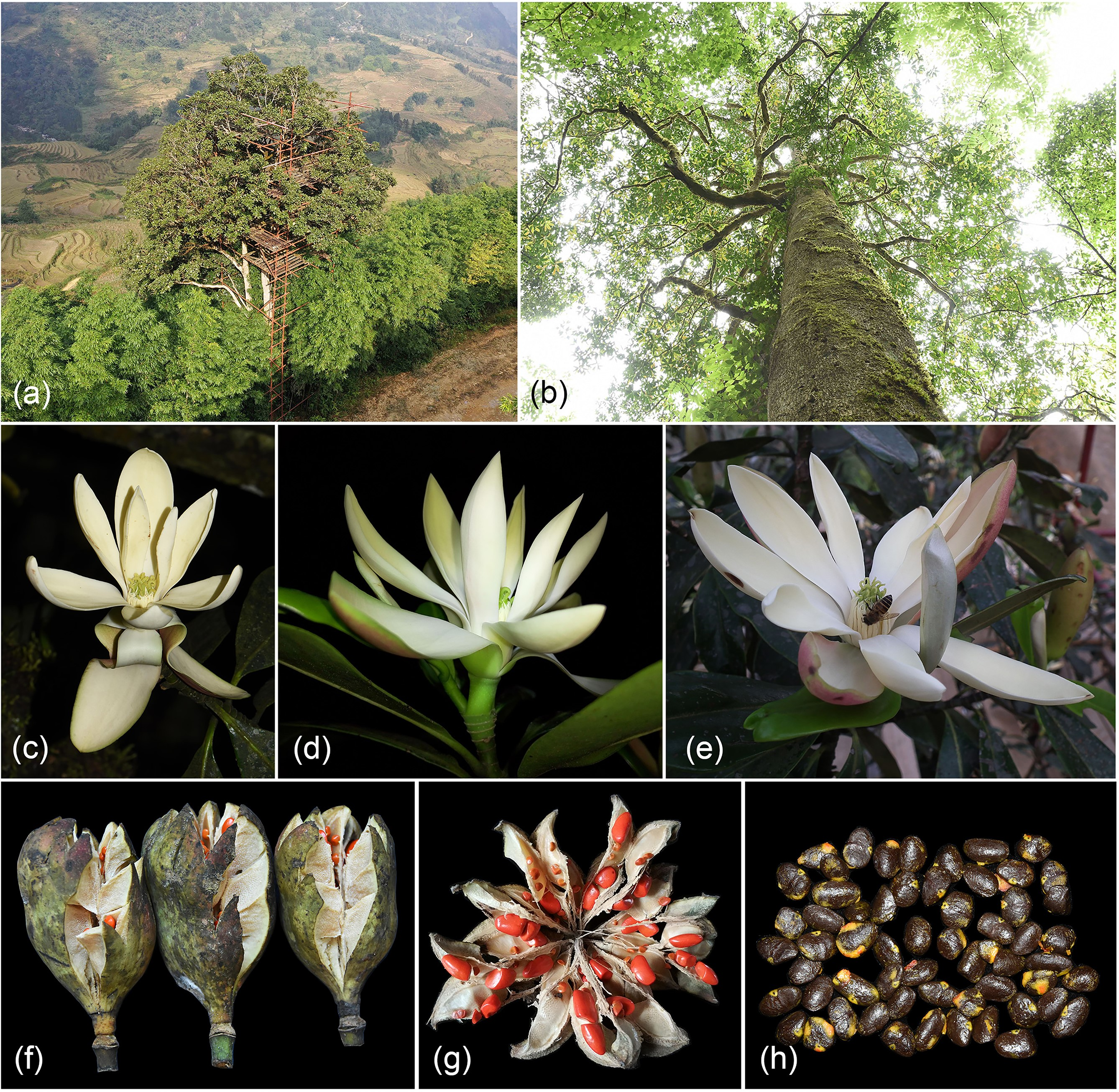
Magnolia sinica habitat and morphological characteristics

Magnolia sinica is a species of flowering plant in the family Magnoliaceae, native to southeast Yunnan Province, China. In China it is known by common name huagaimu and distributes in south subtropical monsoon broadleaved evergreen forests at elevations of 1,339 to 1,707 metres (4,393 to 5,600 ft). It is categorized as Critically Endangered on the IUCN Red List. As a plant species with extremely small populations (PSESP) there were an estimated 50 wild individuals remaining, and has been targeted as one of the 20 species approved by the Yunnan government for urgent rescue action before 2015.
