= South China National Botanical Garden =

Botanical garden in Guangzhou, China

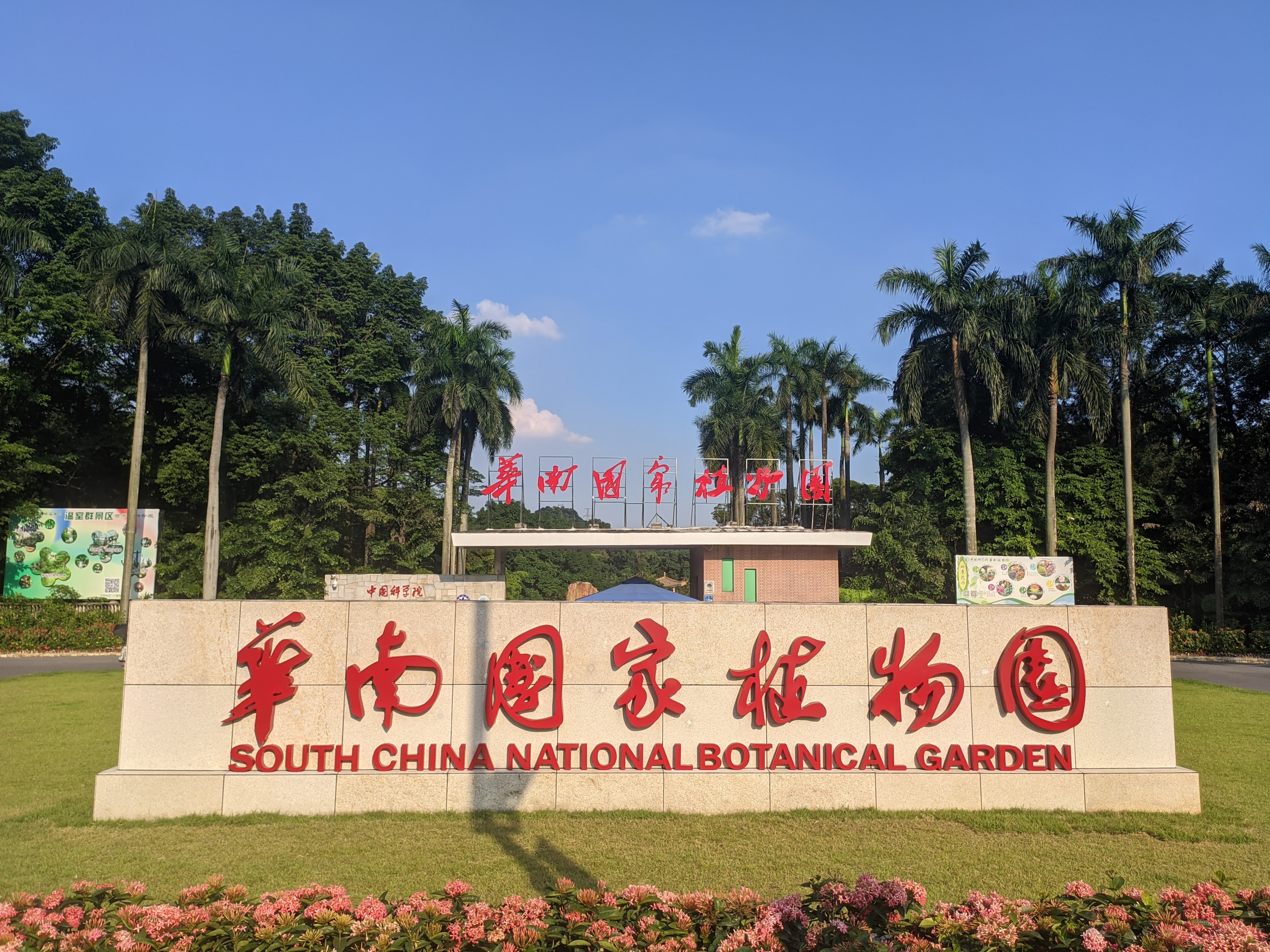

- Location within Guangdong
- Type: Public
- Location: Tianhe District, Guangzhou, China
- Coordinates: 23°11′12″N 113°21′51″E
- Area: 2,854 acres (1,155 ha)
- Created: 1929
- Status: Open year round
- Website: scib.cn

South China National Botanical Garden
- Simplified Chinese: 华南国家植物园
- Traditional Chinese: 華南國家植物園
Transcriptions
Standard Mandarin
- Hanyu Pinyin: Huánán Guójiā Zhíwùyuán
Yue: Cantonese
- Jyutping: Wa^{4} naam^{4} Zik^{6} mat^{6} jyun^{4}

The South China National Botanical Garden (Chinese: 华南国家植物园) of the Chinese Academy of Sciences (formerly Institute of Agriculture and Forestry) is a large botanical garden in Tianhe District, Guangzhou, Guangdong province in southern China.

== History ==
The garden was founded in 1929 by botanist Chen Huanyong (Woon-young Chun). The garden focuses on research in ecology, systematic and evolutionary botany, plant resources, biotechnology, landscape and gardening. It covers 1155 hectares and contains 2400 plant species.

The garden is organized into several specialized collections containing:

== Greenhouses ==
- Alpine & Arctic plants
- Aquatic plants
- Mediterranean plants
- Tropical plants
- Desert plants

== Garden ==
- Magnolias
- Palms
- Gingers
- Orchids
- Medicinal Herbs
- Relic plants
- Bonsai
- Landscaping Trees
- Camellias
- Bamboo
- Rhododendron
- Economical plants
- Rare and Endangered plants

== Transport ==
- Botanical Garden station on Guangzhou Metro Line 6
