= List of Nanjing University people =

This is a list of Nanjing University people includes notable graduates, non-graduates, professors and other people affiliated with Nanjing University.

== Graduates ==
- Zhou Bangdao, scholar, educator. The first "Zhuangyuan" since the establishment of Republic of China (ranked No.1 in the 1st R.O.C. Gaodeng Examination which is in a certain sense equivalent to former Imperial examination, 1931). He was later the president of China Medical College (China Medical University), vice minister of Ministry of Examination of R.O.C..
- Chang Chi-yun, historian, geographer, educationist, politician.

=== Education ===
- Li Linsi, educator, diplomat, scholar. He was the Director General of the Ministry of Education of the Republic of China, diplomatic consultant to Chiang Kai-shek, co-founder of the United Nations Association of China, distinguished professor at the National Central University.
- Tai Shuangqiu, educator dedicated to people's livelihood. The advocator of the Teachers' Day in China.
- Zhang Zonglin, the first professional male teacher of Chinese modern kindergarten.

=== Humanities ===
- Wang Ling, historian, educator. Key collaborator of Joseph Needham on the monumental work Science and Civilisation in China
- Tang Junyi, philosopher.
- Chen Chung-hwan, philosopher.
- Lu Qian, dramatist, litterateur, poet, scholar
- Ma Zhencheng, translator

=== Social sciences ===
- Xia Shuzhang, scholar in public administration, the father of MPA education in China.
- Hsing Mu-huan, economist, the first Director of Institute of Economics, Academia Sinica.
- Han Depei jurist
- Yang Bi-li, the pioneer guru of management education in Chinese community, the initiator of Chinese MBA education.
- Yang Kaidao, sociologist
- Mher D. Sahakyan, Founder of China-Eurasia Council for Political and Strategic Research, International Political Scholar, Editor of Routledge Handbook of Chinese and Eurasian International Relations.

=== Natural science & technology ===
- Zhang Qiming, a distinguished professor of Electrical Engineering and Materials Science and Engineering at Pennsylvania State University. He is also the vice President & CTO at Strategic Polymer Sciences, Inc.
- Zhang Xiang, a faculty scientist at Lawrence Berkeley National Laboratory and director of NSF Nano-scale Science and Engineering Center; member of National Academy of Engineering of USA.
- Wang Yifang, elementary particle and accelerator physicist.
- Zhou Zhonghe, researcher and director, Institute of Vertebrate Paleontology and Paleoanthropology, Chinese Academy of Sciences; member of U.S. National Academy of Sciences.
- Jeff Xia, astronomy, mathematician.
- Gang Tian, mathematician.
- Liu Dongsheng, geologist. Winner of Tyler Prize for Environmental Achievement.
- Kenneth Jinghwa Hsu, geologist, paleoclimatologist, oceanographer, author, government advisor, inventor and entrepreneur, a winner of Wollaston Medal, Penrose Medal and Twenhofel Medal, the first president of European Geophysical Society.
- Xia Peisu, computer scientist. She developed China's first general purpose digital computer.
- Feng Duan, physicist.
- Wang Debao, biochemist. He firstly synthesized yeast alanine transfer RNA.
- Gilbert N. Ling, cell physiologist, biochemist. His achievements include developing microelectrode and he put forward the Association Induction Hypothesis which is controversial.
- Yuan-Cheng Fung, scientist of bioengineering and biomechanics. The "Founder of Modern Biomechanics" and a founding figure of bioengineering. He is the winner of United States National Academy of Engineering Founders Award (NAE Founders Award, 1998), National Medal of Science (U.S.A., 2000), and Russ Prize (2007).
- Qian Ji, the General Designer of China's first satellite (Dongfanghong I).
- Feng Kang, mathematician. The founder of finite element algorithm.
- W. H. T. Loh (Wellington Hsiao-tung Loh), leading authority on dynamics and thermodynamics of re-entry and planetary entry. A leading figure in American Apollo program and Mars Exploration program. He was the chairman of international conference on space exploration held in Washington in 1972.
- Jingguang Chen, Chinese-American chemical engineer
- Chien-Shiung Wu, scientist. The "First Lady of Physics", the "Greatest Experimental Physicist in 20th Century". The first laureate of Wolf Prize in Physics, the first female President of the American Physical Society.
- Chung-Yao Chao, physical scientist. The first scientist that captured positron through electron-positron annihilation and tested the existence of antimatter.
- Y. H. Woo, physical scientist. After Wu Youxun verified Compton effect (X-ray diffraction), Nobel Prize was given to Arthur H.Compton.
- Dan D. Yang, educator, entrepreneur and businesswoman, founder of VINCI Education and creator of VINCI Blended Learning
- Zhi-Hua Zhou, computer scientist, ACM fellow.
- Fangxun Li, physical chemist.
- Hung_KAO(Hong_GAO，_高鸿), analytical chemist.
- Guangzhao Mao, chemical engineer and an academic.

=== Business, industry, commerce and finance ===
- Wang Hao, President of HNA Group.
- Fang Hongbo, Chairman of Midea Company.
- Yi Huiman, Chairman of Industrial and Commercial Bank of China.
- Jia Chengzao, Chief Geologist and Vice President of China National Petroleum Corporation, Chairman of Chinese Petroleum Society.
- Kathy Xu (Xu Xin), founder and CEO of Capital Today, with the nickname Queen of Venture Capital in China.
- Tang I-Fang (Tang Yifang), "Father of Singapore Industry", former Singapore Economic Development Board Chairman, a founder of Jurong Industrial Park and Singapore Science Park, Chairman of Board of Singapore United Engineers Group and WBL Corporation, etc.
- Wang Chih-hsin (Wang Zhishen, often mistakenly spelled as Wang Zhixin), a founder and the first General Manager of former Shanghai Stock Exchange.
- Hsu Po-Yuan (Xu Boyuan), financier, former Central Bank Governor, Ministry of Finance, R.O.C. He's the founder of Chinese central bank system.

=== Politics & government ===
- Guo Jinlong, Mayor of Beijing. He was the Executive President of the Beijing Organizing Committee for the 29th Olympic Games.
- Yang Jiechi, the foreign minister of the People's Republic of China.
- Chen Deming, the Minister of Commerce, P.R.C.
- Li Shengjiao, senior diplomat, jurist. He contributed to the creation and implementation of the United Nations Convention on the Law of the Sea.
- Sha Zukang, diplomat, the head of United Nations Department of Economic and Social Affairs.
- Kwoh-Ting Li, economic expert, statesmen. The "Father of Taiwan's Economic Miracle".

=== Arts ===
- Hong Fan, musician. The "father of modern Chinese wind music (tube music)", the "father of modern Chinese martial music".
- Chien-Ying Chang, artist who settled in Britain.
- Chiang Yee, poet, author, painter, calligrapher. The "Silent Traveller".
- Lü Fengzi, artist, art educator. The founder of the first modern fine arts school in China.

=== Literature ===
- Nieh Hua-Ling, writer. Contributed a lot to world literature exchange.
- Shen Zufen, scholar, writer. Classic writer.

=== Journalism & media ===
- Hu Bangji, journalist. China's war correspondent in European battlefield in World War II. She interviewed many men of the time, including Winston Churchill, Franklin D. Roosevelt, Joseph Stalin, Charles de Gaulle, Harry S. Truman, Neville Chamberlain and Josip Broz Tito. Her husband, Bi Jilong, former vice secretary general of United Nations, was her schoolmate at Nanjing University.
- Yu Chi-chung, Taiwan's media gurus, the founder of the China Times Group.

=== Performing arts & entertainment ===
- Chang Cheh, film director. The "Father of New Gongfu Film", the "Godfather of Hong Kong cinema".
- Lu Yang, film director, photographer, scientist extraordinaire
- Gong Jianong, actor
- Slater Rhea (Shuai De, 帅德), American singer and TV personality on CCTV; MA graduate of the Hopkins-Nanjing Center.

=== Miscellaneous ===
- Li Lu, student leader of democracy movement, investment banker, investor.
- Zeng Liansong, the designer of the Flag of the People's Republic of China.
- Fang Xianjue, a general against the invasion of militaristic Japan
- Luo Fuxin, the first blind college student in China.

== Non-graduate ==
- Miles Flint, the former President of Sony Ericsson Mobile Communications.
- Kim Jun-Yop, historian, educationalist, social activist.
- Mochtar Riady, financial magnate in southeast Asia. Founder and CEO of Lippo Group. Chairman of the Asian Bankers Association. The founder of several banks.
- Wang Gungwu, historian, educator.
- Jiang Zemin, former paramount leader of China, studied at Nanjing Central University from 1943 to 1945.
- Vikram Seth, poet, novelist.
- Diao Aiqing, unsolved murder victim.

== Faculty members ==
Professors and various members of teaching and/or research, including former faculty members.

- Du Junfei, scholar in computer-mediated communication and mass communication. A pioneer scholar in the study of internet mass communication.
- Robert March, scholar in international business and negotiation
- Xu Xin, a founder of Judaic studies in China.
- Xu Longdao, physics
- Na zhong, the first scholar teaching Arabic in Chinese universities, master of Arabic culture and history studies.
- Ren Mei'e, geomorphologist, geologist, marine and coastal scientist
- Zheng Ji, biochemist
- Zhang Daqian, artist
- Xu Beihong, artist
- Thome H. Fang, philosopher
- Pearl Buck, writer. A Pulitzer Prize-winning writer, the first American woman to be awarded the Nobel Prize in Literature.
- Ma Yinchu, economist.
- Mei Guangdi, the first dean of the first department of western literature in Chinese universities.
- Xiong Qinglai, mathematician
- Mao Yisheng, structural engineer
- Zhu Kezhen, meteorologist, geologist.
- Liu Boming philosopher
- Wang Yanqing, the first musician introducing Guqin and Guoyue education into modern higher learning institutions. The founder of Meian qin school (Meian music school. Meian is the Zi (字, a kind of name) of former school president Li Ruiqing).
- Tao Xingzhi, educator
- Matsumoto Kouzirou, educationist. Former provost of Tokyo Higher Normal School (today's University of Tsukuba). He jointly founded the first magazine for children education in Japan.
- Xiao Junxian, the first artist providing Chinese painting education in modern institutions of higher learnings.
- Liu Yizheng, historian
- Wang Bohang, Confucian scholar, literary history scholar
- Wang Yening, physicist

Honorary professors, visiting professors

- Hans Driesch, biologist and philosopher. German leader of vitalism. He taught for a semester in 1922.
- David Goltzman, endocrinologist, Professor of Medicine and Physiology, and A.G. Massabki Chair in Medicine at McGill University. He received an honorary professorship from Nanjing University.
- Charles W. Woodworth, American entomologist. The founder of the Entomology Division University of California, Berkeley. He was a lecturer in Entomology during his sabbatical there in 1918 and then again between 1921-1924. See the C. W. Woodworth Award.

== Alumni of merged and attached schools ==
Alumni of the University of Nanking (merged in 1952)

- Choh Hao Li, biologist, biochemist. His achievements include isolating and synthesizing the human pituitary growth hormone and he received many honors including Lasker Award.
- Choh-Ming Li, educationist, economist.
- Francois Cheng, writer, poet. A "Bridge Between Eastern and Western Culture".
- T.C. Tso, agriculturalist, tobacco scientist.
- Te-Tzu Chang, agriculturalist. He receives Tyler World Prize for Environmental Achievement 1999.
- Wu Teh Yao, educationist, politics scholar.
- Thome H. Fang, philosopher.

Alumni of attached schools

- Gao Xingjian, novelist, dramatist and critic. Nobel Prize Winner in Literature in 2000. He entered Middle School Attached to University of Nanking (Now Jinling High School) in 1952.
- Yuan Longping, agriculturalist. "China's Most Famous 'Farmer'", "Father of Hybrid Rice", Wolf Prize winner in agriculture. He graduated from Middle School Attached to National Nanjing University (Now High School Affiliated to Nanjing Normal University) in 1949.

== Related ==
- Nanjing University alumni
- Academic staff of Nanjing University
- Nanjing University Presidents
