= Danyang =

Danyang may refer to:

== Locations in China ==
- Danyang, Jiangsu (丹阳市), county-level city of Jiangsu
  - Danyang railway station
  - Danyang East railway station
  - Danyang North railway station
- Danyang, Ma'anshan (丹阳镇), town in Bowang District, Ma'anshan, Anhui
- Danyang, Lianjiang (丹阳镇), town in Lianjiang County, Fujian
- Danyang, Changde (丹阳街道), subdistrict in Wuling District, Changde, Hunan
- Danyang (Chu) (丹陽), ancient capital of the State of Chu

== Korea ==
- Danyang County (단양군 / 丹陽郡), Chungcheongbuk-do, South Korea

== See also ==
- Danyang Road station, Shanghai Metro
- Yang Dan (disambiguation)
