= Mingjian (disambiguation) =

Mingjian is a rural township in Taiwan.

Mingjian may also refer to:

- MingJian, a Chinese product-testing organization
- Tian Mingjian (1964–1994), Chinese spree killer
- Zhao Mingjian (born 1987), Chinese footballer
- Michele Ruggieri (1543–1607), Italian jesuit priest and missionary known as "Lou Mingjian"
- Mingjian yaojing, a part of Zhi (excrescences)
