= Geyuan =

Coordinates: 32.402015°N 119.438148°E

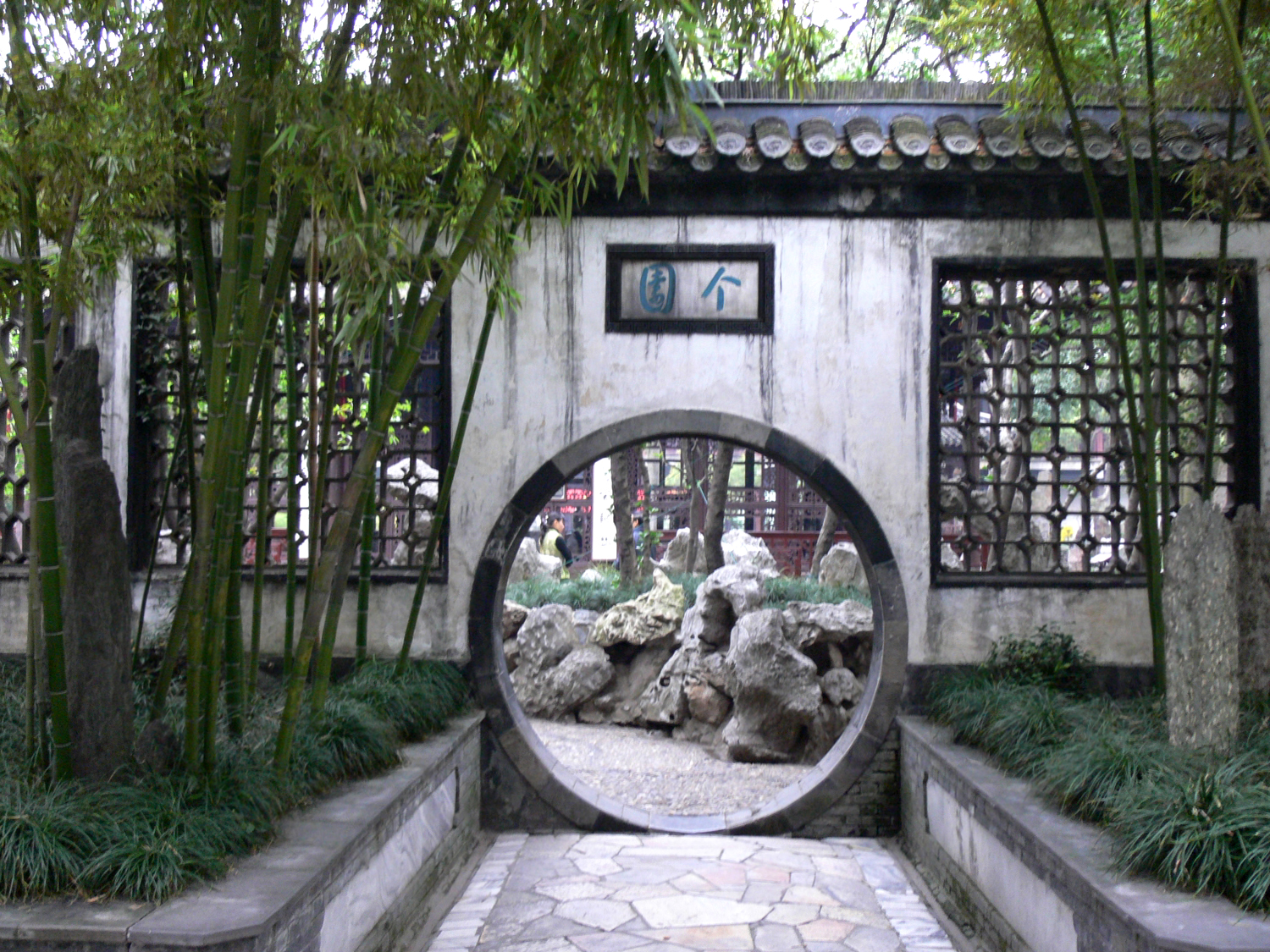
- Moon gate in Geyuan (Traditional Chinese was written left to right)
- Traditional Chinese: 个園
- Simplified Chinese: 个园
- Literal meaning: Garden of the Character 个 (Note: The name came from the shape of bamboo leaves, so the 个 here is not the simplified form of 箇 or 個, its usual modern meanings.); Garden of the Bamboo Leaves
Transcriptions
Standard Mandarin
- Hanyu Pinyin: Gèyuán; Gè Yuán
- Wade–Giles: Ko-yüan; Ko Yüan

Geyuan, Ge Yuan, or Ge Garden is located on Dongguan Street in Yangzhou, a city renowned for traditional private gardens, in Jiangsu Province, southeast China.

Geyuan is open to the public, with different sections representing each of the four seasons. Spring is demonstrated with a picture of bamboo and rock. Summer is represented by the steel-grey Taihu stone. Autumn is depicted by Huangshan stone, and winter by Xuan stone.

== History ==
Geyuan was known as the Garden of the Long-Lived Zhi (t 壽芝園, s 寿芝园, Shòuzhīyuán) during the Ming Dynasty. In 1818 (the 22nd year of the reign of the Jiaqing Emperor), the salt commissioner Huang Zhiyun bought the land and rebuilt the garden as a private retreat. Huang Zhiyun loved bamboo, believing that they were as persistent, modest, straightforward, and loyal as a good man. A cluster of three bamboo leaves resembles the Chinese character 个 (pronounced gè in Mandarin). This was also noted by Yuan Mei, a writer during the Qing Dynasty: "The moonlight made the bamboo shadows hundreds of gè characters". The owner also chose the name "Geyuan" for his garden to correspond to his given name Zhiyun (至筠), which also means "bamboo".

== Architecture ==
Geyuan is known for its seasonal rock gardens, which paint a colorful landscape: "the rockery in spring is flamboyant like a bright smile, in summer is verdant like sparkling dewdrops, in autumn is clean like a light makeup, and in winter, it is pale like a sleeping beauty". The "spring hill is for visit, summer hill is for sight, the autumn hill is for climbing, and winter hill is for residence".

The garden covers an area of 2.5 hectares (6.2 acres). It is a small, elegant urban wooded mountain garden, primarily made up of bamboo and rocks. Rocks of different hues and shapes are used to represent scenes from the four seasons; hence, the rock garden was named the “Artificial Mountain of Four Seasons”. This artificial mountain has a typical Chinese artistic conception, as described in the poem below:

Mountains in spring look like young maids with light make-up, smiling.
Mountains in summer look like dark green jade as crystal and clear as water drops.
Mountains in autumn look like charming ladies with careful make-up, bright and unstained.
Mountains in winter look like old men sleeping in gloom and coldness.

== See also ==
- List of Chinese gardens

== Gallery ==
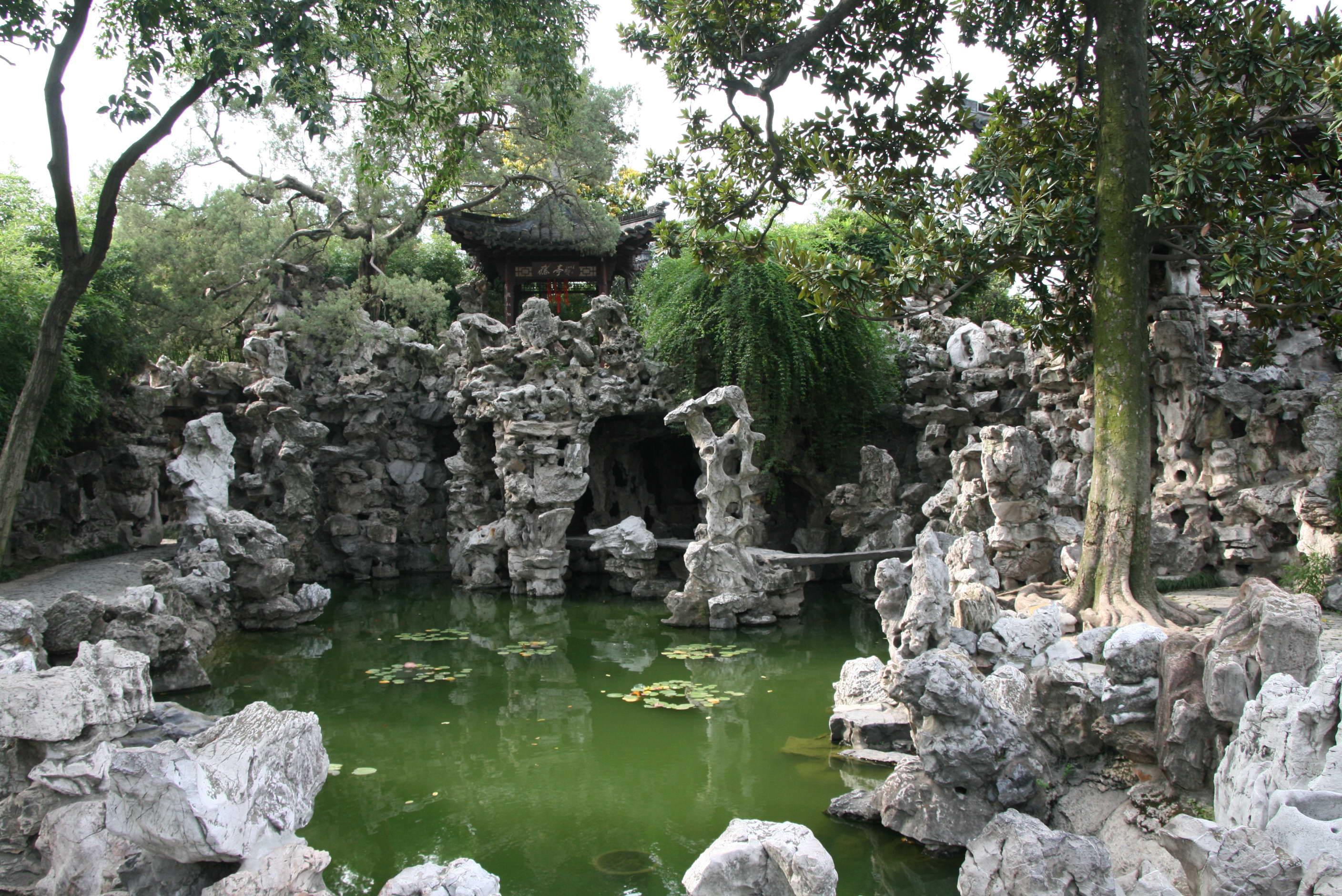

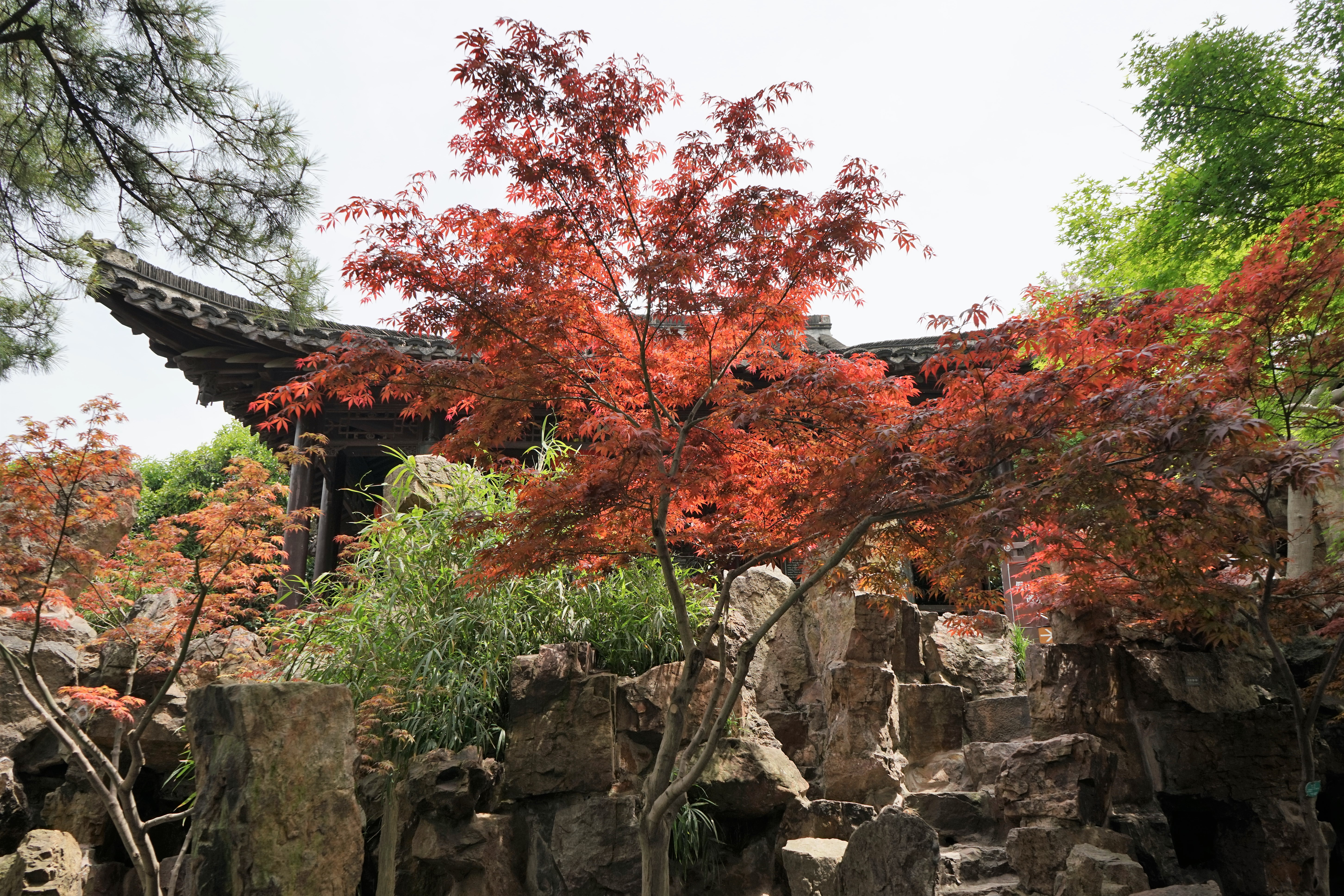

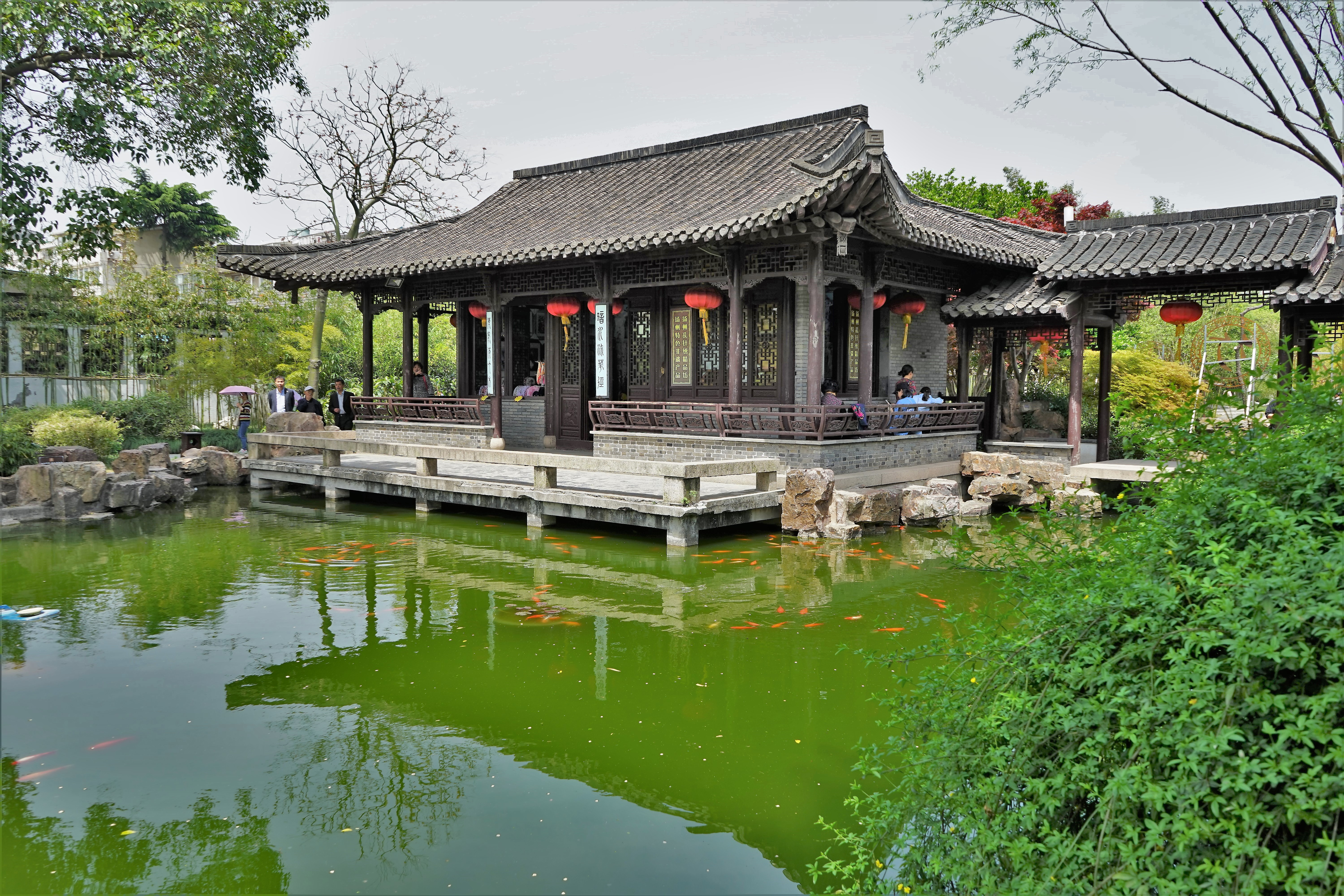

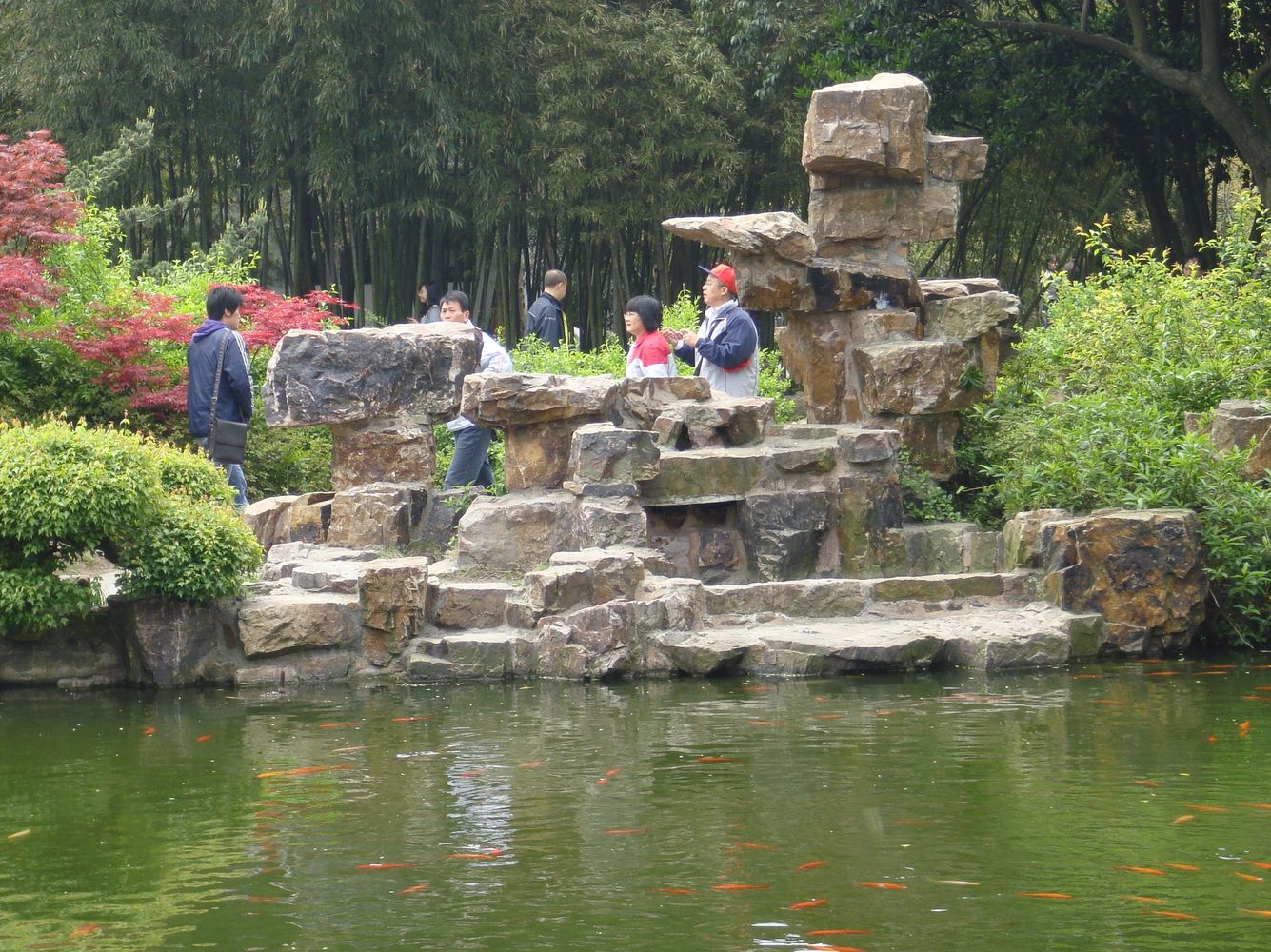

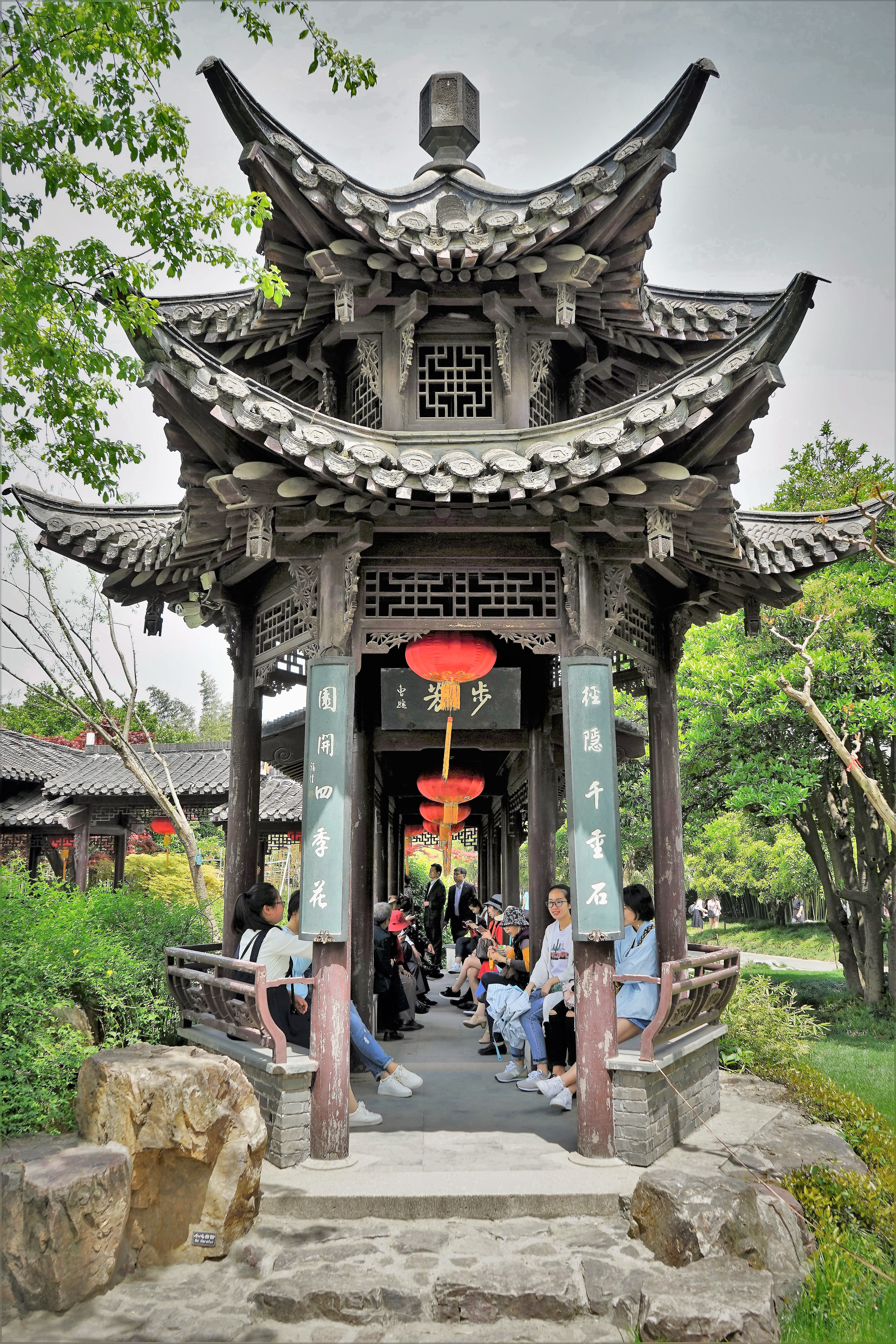
