= Chen Kang =

Chen Kang may refer to:

- Chen Chung-hwan (1905–1992), scholar of ancient Greek and Western philosophy
- Chen Kang (badminton) (born 1965), Chinese badminton player
