= Fangxun Li =

Chinese chemist

- Born: December 25, 1902; Yizheng, Jiangsu, Qing China
- Died: August 2, 1962 (aged 59); Nanjing, Jiangsu, China
- Citizenship: Chinese
- Education: University of Nanking (1925); Northwestern University (1930)
- Scientific career
- Fields: Chemistry, Physical Chemistry
- Workplaces: Nanjing University
- Doctoral advisor: Ward V. Evans
- Notable students: Choh Hao Li

Fangxun Li (Chinese: 李方训; Fang-Hsuin Lee) (1902-1962) was a Chinese chemist, specializing in physical chemistry. He worked as a researcher, teacher, and administrator, and was the first vice president of Nanjing University after its merger with the University of Nanking in 1952. He was one of the founding members of the Chinese Academy of Sciences, which was created in 1955.

Li got his bachelor's degree in 1925 from the University of Nanking. He then traveled to the United States and obtained his PhD in 1934 at Northwestern University. He studied the influence of dipolar ions on the solubility of salts, molar polarization and radius-ratio of ions.

Having returned to the University of Nanking in 1934, he invited Choh Hao Li, who had recently obtained his Bachelor degree, to collaborate on a project; this led to a paper in the Journal of the American Chemical Society, and inspired Choh Hao Li to pursue graduate studies in the United States.

He was given an honorary Degree (Doctor of Science) in 1948 by Northwestern University. The citation is:

Distinguished chemist, teacher, and administrator, who, after earning his doctorate at Northwestern University, returned to his alma mater, Nanking University, where he became successively chairman of the Department of Chemistry and Dean of the College of Liberal Arts. When invading armies engulfed his country he supervised the removal of the university to far western China where, under most trying conditions and with meager equipment, he carried on both teaching and research.

His work was included in "Science Outpost", edited by Joseph Needham.

== Awards, honors and fellowships ==
- 1947 – Member of the council of the Chinese Chemical Society
- 1948 – honorary doctorate, Northwestern University
- 1952 – Vice president, Nanjing University
- 1955 – Member, Chinese Academy of Sciences
- 1957 – Member, Member of the Scientific Planning Committee of the State Council
- 1959 – Member of the National Committee of the Chinese People's Political Consultative Conference
