= Kōjirō Matsumoto =

Japanese educationist

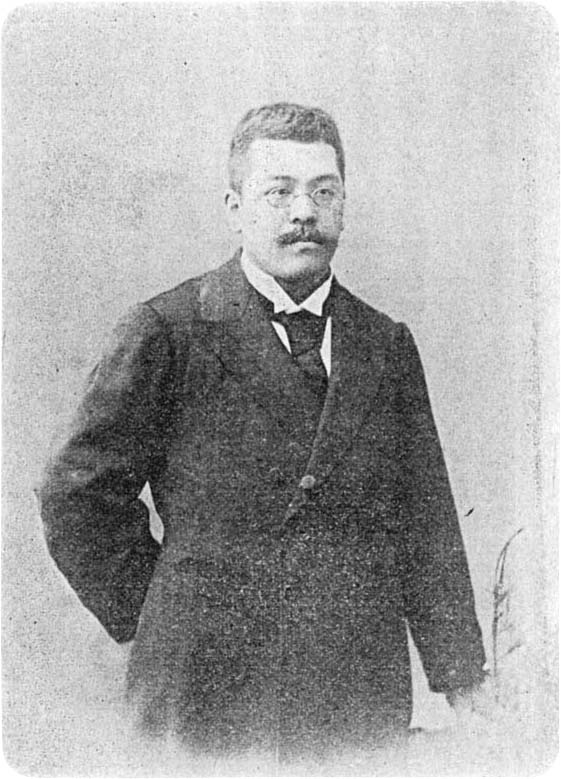

Kōjirō Matsumoto (松本 孝次郎, Matsumoto Kōjirō; 1870 – 1932) is a Japanese educationist. He was a professor of Waseda University, and the provost of Tokyo Higher Normal School (today's University of Tsukuba). With educationists including Takashima (高島平三郎), he jointly founded the Children Research magazine in 1898, and in 1902 founded Children Research Society in Japan. In 1906, he was invited by Liangjiang Higher Normal School (today's Nanjing University) president Li Ruiqing and then came to China to be the school provost.
