= George Arthur Stuart =

American diplomat (1859–1911)

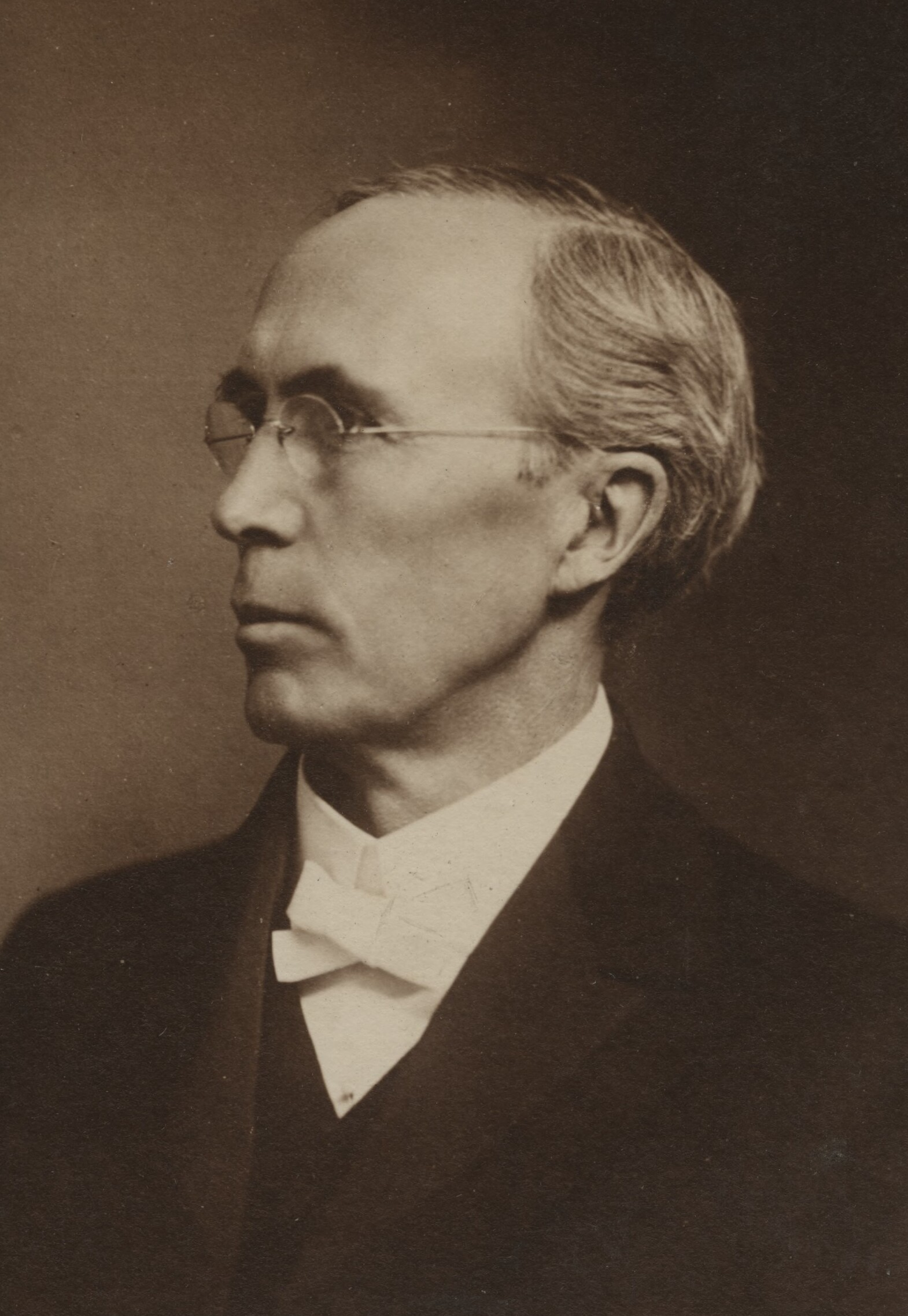
George A. Stuart

George Arthur Stuart (December 31, 1859 – July 25, 1911) was an American Methodist missionary, grew up in Iowa, attended Simpson College, and received an MD from Iowa College of Physicians and Surgeons.

In 1882 he married Rachel Anna Golden.

== Career in China ==
Stuart came to China for missionary work in 1886, accompanied by his wife, and he spent the first few months in Nanjing.

Then he moved to Wuhu during the spring of 1887, and he built the Wuhu General Hospital during the following years. In 1889, he was ordained an elder at Nanjing, having been elected to that office as a missionary by the Des Moines Conference. He continued in charge of the Wuhu Hospital until 1896.

Then he moved to Nanjing in 1897 to take charge of medical teaching in the University of Nanking as university vice president and dean of the medical school. Later the same year, he succeeded Dr. John C. Ferguson as president of the institution.

In addition to his work at the University, he also served as president of the Medical Missionary Association of China (MMAC), which had been founded in 1886. The MMAC merged in 1932 with the National Medical Association of China, which had been founded by Chinese physicians in 1915, to create the Chinese Medical Association.

Besides these official duties, he was busy with literary and missionary pursuits: translating hymns, revising and retranslating the Book of Discipline and other religious materials, serving on a committee that established Chinese medical terminology, and preaching sermons at the University. He was reported to have an excellent singing voice, contributing bass and tenor solos when Handel's Messiah was performed in Nanking.

Stuart was appointed as United States vice consul in 1901.

== Chinese materia medica ==
In 1900, Stuart began a project to revise Frederick Porter Smith's Chinese materia medica. Before his death, Stuart completed the volume covering vegetable substances, which was published in 1911. The book drew extensively on the Bencao gangmu. It was to be the first of three volumes, with additional books covering animal and mineral substances.

- Stuart, G. A. (1911). Chinese materia medica: vegetable kingdom. Shanghai: American Presbyterian Mission Press.

== Death ==
Stuart died in 1911.
