= Robert March =

Robert M. March (2 May 1927 – 20 November 2010) was an Australian professor who taught in China, Australia and Japan and wrote extensively regarding East Asian business practices.

From 1980 to 2010 he was the President of the International Management Development Centre, Australia, Japan, China. He was a Guest Professor of International Business at the School of Business Nanjing University from 2006 to 2008. He was an adjunct professor of International Business at the University of New England from 2000 to 2004. He was a professor of International Business at the University of Western Sydney, Nepean from 1994 to 1998. He was a professor of International Business at Aoyama Gakuin University, Tokyo from 1981 to 1988. He was a visiting professor of International Marketing and Negotiation at IIST, Japan from 1973 to 1981.

He wrote six books before retiring on the New South Wales Central Coast in early 2010.

He was working with the assistance of his fifth wife, Gao Yuan Qing, on two studies of Chinese culture: The Playfulness of the Chinese People and Human Relationships in China when he died. He died at the age of 83. He had recently completed three new manuscripts on Chinese and Japanese international business negotiations. They have not been published.

== Partial list of publications ==
=== Books ===
- "International Team Negotiation" UIBE Press, Beijing (2009)
- "Cross Cultural Business Communication" UIBE Press, Beijing (2008)
- "The Chinese Negotiator" Kodansha International, Tokyo (2006)
- "Business Relationships with the Chinese" IMDC Australia Pty. Ltd. (2003)
- "Reading The Japanese Mind: The Realities Behind Their Thoughts and Actions" Kodansha International, Tokyo. (1996)
- "Working For A Japanese Company: Insights Into The Multicultural Workplace" Kodansha International, Tokyo (1992)
- "Honoring the Customer: Marketing and Selling to the Japanese" John Wiley & Sons (1991) [also known as "The Honourable Customer", UK, Australia]
- "The Japanese Negotiator: Subtlety and Strategy Beyond Western Logic" Kodansha International, Tokyo (1989)
- "Nihonjin to Umaku Kosho Suru Ho, (How to Negotiate With the Japanese)" PHP (1988)
- "Nippon no Gokai", (Japan's Misunderstandings) Keizaikai, Tokyo (1987)

=== Papers ===
- "Advances in Team Negotiation". Working Paper in Preparation (2009–2010)
- "Business Relationship Development with East Asian Partners and Customers: The Character of Successive Stages". Paper presented to Australian International Business Association Conference, University of New South Wales (July 2000)
- "Managing Business Relationships with East Asia: Towards a Model of Long-term Asian/Western Business Relationships". Paper presented to Western Conference of the Association for Asian Studies, University of Colorado (23-26 October 1997)
- "Managing Business Relationships with East Asia: Building and Testing a Model of Long-Term Asian/Western Business Relationships", Working Paper 3/1997, UWS Nepean.
- "The Inter/Manage Project - First Stage", Working paper 6/1996, UWS Nepean.
- "The Internationalisation of The Manager: A Literature Review and Research Proposal", Working Paper 4/96, Copenhagen Business School (1996)
- "Inscrutables Negotiate with Inscrutables: Japanese Views on Negotiating with the Chinese", Working Paper 12/1994, UWS Nepean.

== See also ==
- List of Nanjing University people
