= Yang Dan =

Yang Dan or Dan Yang is the name of:

- Yang Dan (chemist) (杨丹), Hong Kong-Chinese chemist
- Dan D. Yang (杨丹), businesswoman
- Yang Dan (neuroscientist) (丹扬), Chinese-American neuroscientist
