= C. C. Li =

Chinese-American geneticist

- 李景均
- Born: Ching Chun Li; October 27, 1912; Tianjin, Republic of China
- Died: October 20, 2003 (aged 90); Mt. Lebanon, Pennsylvania, United States
- Education: University of Nanking (BS), Cornell University (PhD)
- Known for: An Introduction to Population Genetics
- Awards: Arno Motulsky–Barton Childs Award for Excellence in Human Genetics Education (1998)
- Scientific career
- Fields: Population genetics, human genetics
- Workplaces: Columbia University, North Carolina State University, University of Nanking, Peking University, Beijing Agricultural University, University of Pittsburgh

Ching Chun Li (Chinese: 李景均; pinyin: Lǐ Jǐngjūn; Wade–Giles: Li^{3} Ching^{3}-chün^{1}; October 27, 1912 – October 20, 2003) was a Chinese-American population geneticist and human geneticist. He was known for his research and the book An Introduction to Population Genetics.

== Biography ==
C. C. Li was born on October 27, 1912, in Dagukou (Taku), Tianjin, China. He received a Bachelor of Science in agronomy from the University of Nanking in 1936 and a PhD in plant breeding and genetics from Cornell University in 1940. He worked as post-doctoral fellow at Columbia University and North Carolina State University from 1940 to 1941.

Li returned to China at the age of 30 and became the Professor of Genetics and Biometry at University of Nanking, his alma mater, in 1943. After World War II, he moved to Beijing for a Professorship and dean of Agronomy at Peking University in 1946, where he finished An Introduction to Population Genetics in 1948. The book was the first notable publication where a combination of the ideas of Ronald Fisher, Sewall Wright, and J. B. S. Haldane about population genetics was brought to and made understandable to the academia.

Li became persona non grata for studying and teaching genetics following the 1949 establishment of a communist government in mainland China. The new government took the diplomatic policy of "Leaning to One Side" and adopted Soviet thought and action, including the genetic thought of the Soviet pseudoscientist Trofim Lysenko, who was standing against Mendelian inheritance. In 1949, Li was appointed as a professor at Beijing Agricultural University (now China Agricultural University), which had been recently founded through the merger of the Colleges of Agriculture at Peking University, Tsinghua University, and North China University (now the Renmin University of China). Li was persecuted by the party branch secretary of Beijing Agricultural University, Le Tianyu, because of Li's defense of genetics. In 1950, Li fled with his family to Hong Kong, where he was trapped without documentation of citizenship and unable to obtain a visa. Friends and colleagues, particularly Nobel laureate H. J. Muller and former US surgeon general Thomas Parran, assisted Li in emigrating to the United States. Li joined the newly founded School of Public Health (GSPH) at the University of Pittsburgh in 1951. He became Professor of Biometry in 1960 and later chaired the School of Public Health's Department of Biostatistics from 1969 to 1975. He also served as the president of the American Society of Human Genetics in 1960. Despite officially retiring in 1982, he continued to publish another 25 academic papers and go to work at his office every day until a few months before his death in 2003.

== Bibliography ==
=== Original reports ===
- Li, C.C. (1953). "On an equation specifying equilibrium populations". Science. 117 (3041): 378–379. Bibcode:1953Sci...117..378L. doi:10.1126/science.117.3041.378. PMID 13048687.
- Li, C.C. (1953). "Some general properties of recessive inheritance". Am J Hum Genet. 5 (3): 269–279. PMC 1716474. PMID 13080252.
- Li, C.C. (1958). "An introduction to genetic statistics". Am J Hum Genet. 10 (1): 72–75. PMC 1931876.
- Li, C.C. (1960). "Biometrics". McGraw-Hill Encyclopedia of Science and Technology. Vol. 1. pp. 223–232.
- Li, C.C. (1962). "Methodology in human genetics". Science. 138: 807–808. doi:10.1126/science.138.3542.807-a.
- Li, C.C. "Environment changes: The implications for health from the viewpoint of a geneticist". National Health Forum. 1964: 79–83.

=== Books ===
- Li, C.C.: Introduction to Population Genetics National Peking University Press. 1948.
- Li, C.C.: "Heredity and its Variability (by T.D. Lysenko)" Chinese translation, New China Book Co. 1949.
- Li, C.C.: "Soviet Genetics and World Science (by Julian Huxley)" Chinese translation, Taipei, Taiwan. 1953.
- Li, C.C.: Population Genetics University of Chicago Press. 1955. 7th Impression 1972.
- Li, C.C.: "Numbers from Experiments" Boxwood Press. 1959.
- Li, C.C.: Human Genetics Principles and Methods McGraw-Hill Book Co. 1961.
- Li, C.C.: "Introduction to Experimental Statistics" McGraw-Hill Book Co. 1964.
- Li, C.C.: "Path Analysis: A Primer" Boxwood Press. 1975. 2nd printing with corrections 1977. 3rd printing with corrections 1981.
- Li, C.C.: "First Course in Population Genetics" Boxwood Press. 1976.
- Li, C.C.: "Analysis of unbalanced data: A pre-program introduction" Cambridge University Press. 1982.
