= Zhi (excrescences) =

Several substances believed to confer immortality in Taoism

- Ancient Chinese seal script for 芝; zhi
- Chinese: 芝
- Literal meaning: mushroom
Transcriptions
Standard Mandarin
- Hanyu Pinyin: zhī
- Wade–Giles: chih
Middle Chinese
- Middle Chinese: tsyi
Old Chinese
- Baxter–Sagart (2014): tə

The Chinese term zhī (Chinese: 芝) commonly means "fungi; mushroom", best exemplified by the medicinal Lingzhi mushroom, but in Daoism it referred to a class of supernatural plant, animal, and mineral substances that were said to confer instantaneous xian immortality when ingested. In the absence of a semantically better English word, scholars have translated the wide-ranging meaning of zhi as "excrescences", "exudations", and "cryptogams".

== Terminology ==
Translating Chinese zhi (芝) is problematic. For instance, a 2017 Chinese–English dictionary says:

1. mushroom, in general ... an object shaped like a mushroom, e.g., a chariot canopy.
2. [singular] and in [compounds] 靈~ língzhī, "numinous mushroom" and 紫~ zǐzhī, "purple mushroom" (Ganoderma lucidum, G. japonicum), a type of polypore mushroom that grows on wood, especially rotting logs; particularly striking examples sometimes regarded as auspicious celestial omens for having qualities conducing to long life > an entheogenic plant, wondergrowth.
3. fragrant plant often equated with 白芷 báizhǐ, Chinese angelica; in combination with 蘭 lán [orchid] represents a person of high morality and integrity.
4. ~麻 zhīma, sesame (Sesamum indicum) or sesame seeds.

Zhi has synonyms of lingzhi (靈芝; "numinous zhi"), yinzhi (陰草; "concealed zhi"), and zhicao (芝草; "zhi plants"), and is often associated with jade.

Several scholars have described the semantic range of zhi.

- "It certainly had a reference wider than anything we should call a fungus today, for it could include mineral excrescences recalling the shape of mushrooms, all kinds of cryptogams, and doubtless some fictitious plants."
- "The term zhi, which has no equivalent in Western languages, refers to a variety of supermundane substances often described as plants, fungi, or 'excrescences.'"
- "Other translations that preserve the inflection of hidden or asexual reproduction include 'excrescence' or 'exudation', but 'cryptogam' is perhaps the most fitting as it applies not only to mushrooms but also to algae, lichens, mosses, liverworts, and ferns."

Early Chinese dictionaries provide insight into the semantics of zhi. The c. 4th or 3rd century BCE book of glossary Erya, in the chapter Shicao (釋草; "Explaining Plant[ name]s"), defines zhíguàn (淔灌) as xiúzhī (苬芝): "Zhiguan is a numinous mushroom". Guo Pu's c. 310 commentary says he was unfamiliar with the zhíguàn, and glosses, "The zhi flowers three times in one year, it is a felicitous plant" (芝一歲三華苬瑞草). The c. 1822 Erya subcommentary of Hao Yixing (郝懿行) says xiúzhī (苬芝) is a copyist's error for junzhi (菌芝; "mushrooms") (see Baopuzi below), which is another synonym of lingzhi. The 121 CE Shuowen jiezi (Plant Radical section 艸部) defines zhi (芝) as "divine plants" (神艸也).

The Chinese character 芝 for zhi is classified as a typical radical-phonetic compound character combining the "plant" radical 艹 and a zhī (之) phonetic element. In ancient oracle bone script and bronze inscription script, zhi < Old Chinese *təʔ (止, "to stop; stop in", originally a "foot" pictograph) was used as a phonetic loan character for zhi < OC *tə (之). The zhi (芷 with the "plant radical", also written 芝) refers to the fragrant "Chinese angelica".

== Classical texts ==
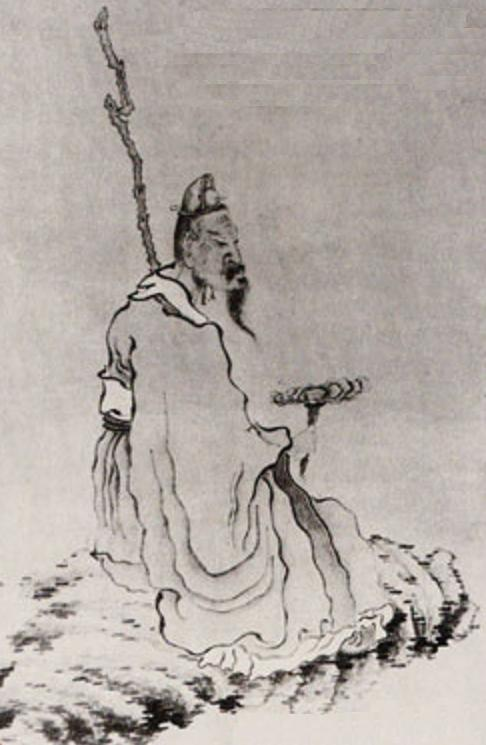
Tao Yuanming holding Lingzhi by Chen Hongshou

The Chinese classics first recorded zhi (芝) during the Warring States period (475–221 BCE) and the Han dynasty (206 BCE – 220 CE). Occurrences in early Chinese histories, such as the (91 BCE) Shiji "Records of the Grand Historian" and (82 CE) Hanshu "Book of Han", predominantly refers to the "Mushroom of Immortality; elixir of life". They record that fangshi "masters of esoterica; alchemists; magicians", supposedly followers of Zou Yan (305–240 BCE), claimed to know secret locations like Mount Penglai where the magic zhi mushroom grew. Some sinologists propose that the mythical zhi derived from Indian legends about soma that reached China around the 3rd century BCE. Fangshi courtiers convinced Qin and Han emperors, most notably Qin Shi Huang (r. 221–210 BCE) and Emperor Wu of Han (r. 141–87 BCE), to dispatch large expeditions (e.g., Xu Fu in 219 BCE) seeking the zhi Plant of Immortality, but none produced tangible results. zhi occurrences in other classical texts often refer to an edible fungus.

The Liji "Record of Ritual" lists zhi "lichens" as a type of condiment. The Chuci (Song of the South) metaphorically mentions, "The holy herb is weeded out". The Huainanzi (Philosophers of Huainan) records a zizhi (紫芝; "purple mushroom") aphorism, "The zhi fungus grows on mountains, but it cannot grow on barren boulders".

== Baopuzi ==
The Jin dynasty Daoist scholar Ge Hong's c. 320 CE Baopuzi (Master Who Embraces Simplicity) is the earliest surviving source of information about zhi excrescences.

Based upon no longer extant texts and illustrations, Chapter 11 (仙藥; Xianyao; "Medicines of Immortality") outlines folklore and knowledge about zhi, and elucidates the wuzhi (五芝; "Five Zhi") classification system. The chapter begins with quoting from the lost Shennong sijing (神農四經; "Shennong's Four Classics") that rates zhi among "medicines of highest type", "The various (five) excrescences [mushrooms, lichens, etc.] may be nibbled, and cinnabar, jade flakes, laminar malachite, realgar, orpiment, mica, and brown hematite may be taken singly, and any of them can enable a man to fly and to enjoy Fullness of Life.".

Ge Hong then explains the five numinous zhi classes based on their appearance and habitat, each said to have over 100 varieties: shizhi (石芝), muzhi (木芝), caozhi (草芝), rouzhi (肉芝), and junzhi (菌芝), see Erya above), which are translated as:

- "stone, wood, grass, flesh, and champignon chih"
- "rock, wood, herb, flesh, and tiny excrescences"
- "stone, tree, plant, meat, and mushroom zhi

Shizhi look like rocks, and grow from craggy cliffs or at the foot of lofty peaks. Muzhi grow from the roots or congealed sap of ancient trees, usually evergreens. Caozhi grow either among vegetation or in complete isolation from it, and appear morphologically identical to conventional plants, complete with stems, leaves, flowers, and fruit. Rouzhi include some exceedingly rare creatures, such as a 10,000-year-old horned toad, a 1,000-year-old white bat (which when eaten will extend one's lifespan to 40,000 or 1,000 years, respectively), and a 7-inch tall humanoid figure riding in a miniature horse-drawn carriage (which grants immediate xian-hood when consumed). Junzhi flourish where standard fungal growths proliferate, and can look like dragons, tigers, human beings, palaces, or flying birds.

At one point in Baopuzi, Ge Hong mentions nine excrescences which are apparently especially important to the diet of the immortal xian (also known as "genies)": "Those that have acquired geniehood [transcendence] often mount to Paradise; or soar in the purple firmament; or travel to Dark Isle; or nest a while in Pan-t’ung. They listen to God’s (Creator Sky) music, and enjoy dishes of the nine sorts of excrescences…."

Based upon later accounts of Five zhi classes, Lu Di tentatively identifies the three natural types. Shizhi is described as a shapeless and colorless thing, sometimes looking like a mass of fat, perhaps some underground stem species, such as Tuber sinense and Rhizopogon piceus. Muzhi is compared "tiny trees" on fuling (茯苓; "Wolfiporia extensa"), which may refer to the fruiting bodies that grow out of the sclerotia. Caozhi can refer to the orchid tianma (天麻; 'heavenly cannabis'; "Gastrodia elata"), the "root" of which is actually a stem tuber.

Ge Hong also gives detailed Daoist purification and ritual instructions for gathering zhi excrescences, such as an adept walking with Yu's Pace when approaching, and using a bone knife to harvest them. Anyone who wants to gather zhi must wait for a calendrically auspicious day and can only enter the sacred mountains on the third or ninth lunar month, when the mountains are open to access and the zhi with miraculous curative power come forth. The Daoist adept is advised to have a Lingbao amulet, a white dog, and a white chicken before making sacrificial offerings to the mountain gods. Ultimately, whether or not adepts can find zhi depends upon their character and intelligence. Mediocre practitioners "do not know the art of entering mountains. One may have pictures, but if the shapes are not known it is utterly impossible to find the excrescences. All mountains, whether large or small, contain ghosts and gods which withhold these things from people, so it would be possible to be walking right over them without seeing them."

Another Baopuzi chapter uses ordinary and numinous zhijun (芝菌; "mushrooms") as an analogy for natural and alchemical gold. "Mushrooms grow naturally, but some genii classics speak of five sorts of "stone" and five sorts of "wood" excrescences [五石五木種芝], which are gathered and taken after they appear, and are no different from the mushrooms which occur in nature [自然芝], for all of them will bring a man to Fullness of Life." From this statement, Pregadio says although there may be no better zhi translation than "mushrooms" or "excrescences", they "pertain to an intermediate dimension between mundane and transcendent reality".

Kristofer Schipper says that for Ge Hong, zhi mushrooms had "immortalizing properties" because they are produced from the sublimation of waidan alchemical minerals lying under the ground, notably gold and the divine cinnabar (cf. Mingjian yaojing below). Mushrooms are, so to speak "natural alchemical products, comparable to the great elixir, the quintessence derived from the transmutation of these very minerals".

Two of Ge Hong's descriptions are found in the Jiuzhuan huandan jing yaojue below.

== Taishang lingbao wufu xu ==
The 3rd or 4th century Taishang lingbao wufu xu (太上靈寳五符序; "The Array of the Five Numinous Treasure Talismans") is sometimes cited as another early source that mentions zhi numinous mushrooms—a misunderstanding that is owing to the usage of wuzhi (五芝) to mean "five plants" rather than "five excrescences". The text has a section titled Fushi wuzhi zhj jing (服食五芝之精; "Ingesting the Essences of the Five Plants"), meaning "plants" since they are pine-resin (威僖; weixi), sesame (胡麻; huma), fagara (椒; jiao), ginger (薑; jiang), and calamus (菖蒲; changpu). Steavu translates Five Plants and notes this as one of the unambiguous and relatively rare occasions when the term zhi should be taken more generically as "plant" rather than "(numinous) mushroom".

However, the Taishang lingbao wufu xu mentions an otherwise unattested text named Shenxian zhi tu (神仙芝圖; "Illustrations of the Mushrooms of Divine Immortality"), which scholars associate with the five lost texts listed in the Baopuzi bibliographic chapter: Muzhi tu (木芝圖; "Illustrations of Wood Mushrooms"), Junzhi tu (菌芝圖; "Illustrations of Fungus Mushrooms"), Rouzhi tu (肉芝圖; "Illustrations of Flesh Mushrooms"), Shizhi tu (石芝圖; "Illustrations of Stone Mushrooms"), and Dapo zazhi tu (大魄雜芝圖; "Illustrations of the Sundry Mushrooms of the Great Whitesoul").

== Jiuzhuan huandan jing yaojue ==
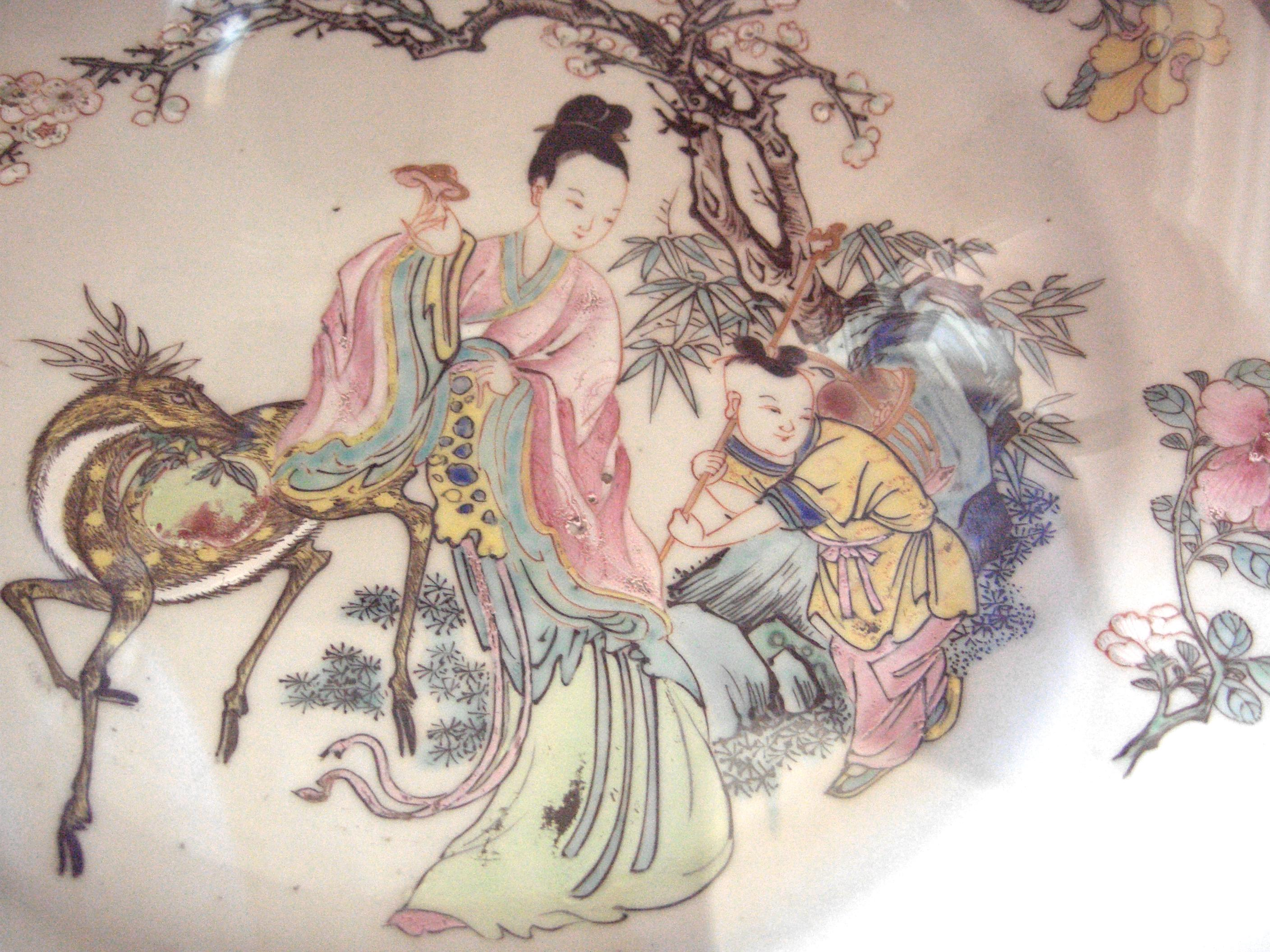
Queen Mother of the West holding a mushroom, Qing dynasty porcelain plate

The second earliest reliable source of zhi information is the Maojun wuzhong zhirong fang (茅君五種芝茸方; "The Method of Lord Mao's Five Kinds of Mushroom Growths") section of the 4th or 5th century Daoist Shangqing School waidan classic Taiji zhenren jiuzhuan huandan jing yaojue (太極真人九轉還丹經要訣; "Essential Instructions on the Scripture of the Reverted Elixir in Nine Cycles, by the Perfected of the Great Ultimate"). The text's three sections comprise an alchemical recipe for the famous Elixir of the Nine Cycles, two methods for compounding minor drugs, and a brief account of the Shangqing saint Mao Ying (茅盈) planting five sacred varieties of zhi (芝; 'fungus'; "supernatural plants that only adepts can recognize as such"). These sections were first appended to Lord Mao's revealed biography from earlier sources, and then separated from it to form the present text.

According to Shangqing traditions, the Queen Mother of the West gave zhi numinous mushrooms to Lord Mao, who planted five kinds on the Shangqing center Maoshan (茅山; "Mt. Mao") in Jiangsu, which is the site of Jintan (金壇; "Golden Altar"), one of the ten greater Grotto-Heavens, and Jinling (金陵; "Golden Mound"), one of the seventy-two Blissful Lands (or Paradises, 福地). The Daoist scholar and alchemist Tao Hongjing (456–536), who compiled the Shangqing canon, recorded that the hidden mushrooms Lord Mao planted on Maoshan were still found during his lifetime.

The Maojun wuzhong zhirong fang describes Lord Mao's five types of zhi fungi, recommends searching for them in the third or ninth month, gives instructions for consumption, and accounts their expected benefits. Two of these five descriptions closely correspond, almost verbatim, to passages from the caozhi "plant mushrooms" and muzhi "wood mushrooms" sub-headings in the Baopuzi, underscoring the text's "status as a locus classicus of all things at once Daoist and fungal".

Concerning the Jiuzhuan huandan jing yaojue uniting two sections about waidan alchemical elixirs with one about zhi excrescences, Strickmann says the "juxtaposition of alchemy and occult horticulture is very suggestive", and provides two other parallels for the Daoist fusion of plants and minerals. The waidan alchemical langgan huadan (琅玕華丹; "Elixir Efflorescence of Langgan"), which is prepared through an "extraordinary amalgam" of vegetable and mineral processes, may have come into being through a conscious fusion of the two types of instructions, originally discretely mineral and vegetable, in the life of Lord Mao. Tao Hongjing's disciple Zhou Ziliang (周子良, 497–516) was commanded by Shangqing deities to commit ritual suicide with an elixir of poisonous mushrooms and cinnabar, which in one sense, indicated the "mortal-immortal's comprehensive power over the elements". The lethal ingredients in Zhou's jiuzhen yuli dan (九真玉瀝丹; "Ninefold Perfected Jade-liquor Elixir") were langgezhi (琅葛芝; "the nine-stalked purple fungus") and jade-infused vermillion.

== Mingjian yaojing ==
The third earliest source is the c. 7th or 8th century Laozi yuxia zhongzhi jing shenxian bishi (老子玉匣中種芝經神仙秘事; "Scripture on Growing Mushrooms from Laozi's Jade Casket: The Secret of Divine Immortals") is the last section of the Mingjian yaojing (明鑒要經; "Scripture on the Essentials of the Bright Mirror [Method["), and shares passages with another Shangqing text, the Zhong zhicao fa (種芝草法; "Methods for Planting the zhi Plants"), probably dating from the late Six Dynasties (222–589) or Southern dynasties (420–589) periods.

The Shenxian bishi is the only text in the Daoist Canon that precisely explains the fungiculture for numinous zhi, in contrast, other canonical texts simply guide mushroom hunters in identifying and locating zhi in the wild. It contains instructions attributed to Laozi that the best zhi are those that grow above deposits of cinnabar (丹砂; dansha), gold (黃金; dhuangjin), laminar malachite (曾青; cengqing), and realgar (雄黃; xionghuang), and teaches how to bury these minerals in the four seasons and the four directions of a mountain in order to generate the four zhi excrescences. This Daoist text has an unusually detailed description of only four zhi, rivaling the Baopuzi in terms of "the amount of information provided per specimen".

The text begins with a passage contrasting three kinds of plant-based medicinal and spiritual substances: longevity drugs, naturally growing zhi excrescences, and artificially cultivated ones. Traditional Chinese medicines, such as asparagus root (天門冬; tianmen dong), or atractylis (山蓟; shanji), can be effective in improving health and extending lifespan, but only if properly consumed every day. The varieties of numinous zhi mushrooms that grow on trees or mountains can bestow full immortality, however most need to be ingested gradually over many years before the adept achieves transcendence. Only zhi that are cultivated above four special soil conditioning minerals, which are highly valued in Chinese alchemy, can grant immortality almost instantly upon ingestion. The esoteric basis for these mushrooms' exceptional potency is explained,

Indeed, accretions on top of cinnabar, accretions on top of gold, accretions on top of laminar malachite, and accretions on top of realgar, all of them generate [numinous] mushrooms. These mushrooms are not those of utmost virtue that respond to divinity, for one can encounter them yet not see them and not be able to eat them. The reason why these mushrooms can immediately make people become immortals is because, by receiving the perfect essence [至精; zhijing] of those four substances, they incorporate the harmonious breath [和氣; heqi] of Heaven and Earth and Yin and Yang along with its fragrant fluids; and by means of this they accomplish generative transformation. These [four] medicines are in fact divine on account of the basic nature of those four substances.

Take laminar malachite (曾青; cengqing; 'layered blue'), the first of the four alchemical minerals, as an example of the Laozi yuxia zhongzhi jing shenxian bishi's detailed instructions for cultivating supernatural zhi.

On a day at the beginning of spring, dig up the ground at the [shaded] East-northeast area of a household. Whether it is on the inside or the outside of the dwelling does not matter; it is only necessary to obtain [a site with] good soil that is not too ashen. Dig and make hole that is three feet deep and three feet across. Take one catty [1.3 pounds] of laminar malachite mineral and process it into grounds. Wrap the grounds in a sheep's [skin] to keep them together. Sprinkle with half a liter of blue cockscomb (Celosia cristata) [and place them in the hole]. Cover with soil and pound on top. After seven days, there should be blue clouds that come and cover the site, and after seventy days, it will generate blue breath that [rises and] connects with the blue clouds above. After a hundred days, a [blue] mushroom will sprout atop the site, as shown in the following image [the image is missing]. On a yinmao day following sunset, make an offering of three feet of blue silk, while grasping a bone knife, perform the Pace of Yu and cut out the mushroom. [Depart] and be careful not to look back [after completing the harvest]. Then, return to dry the mushroom in the shade for one hundred clays and process it into grounds. Ingest one spatula full and take it thrice daily by means of fragrant well water. When the mushroom is entirely consumed, you will immediately be able to lightly float about. Gods will arrive to welcome you. You will ascend to heaven in broad daylight and be as limitless as Heaven and Earth.

Several of these particular ritual elements for cultivating a malachite zhi are found in the Baopuzi passage on mushroom junzhi, including the exorcistic Pace of Yu, the bone knife, and the specifics of drying and processing. These instructions are essentially a more intricate version of what is found in the Baopuzi, a source that "set the standard for texts on numinous mushrooms and was still used as a template over five hundred years after it was written".

Directives for the three remaining types of zhi mushrooms follow the same sacramental blueprint as well. The adept follows a precise practice of planting, harvesting, and consuming zhi fungi that sprout upon a divine class of minerals identified with four of the Wuxing (Five Agents, Five Phases), corresponding to the spring/east/blue malachite zhi in seasons, cardinal directions, cloud and mist colors, and supernatural results. Summer/south/red cinnabar zhi: will transform all internal illnesses into turbid blood that flows out through the mouth and nose, and adepts will "immediately be able to pace on water, [pass through] flames and fire without getting burned, and cut out grains and not eat [without being hungry]". Autumn/west/yellow gold zhi: ensures that "the old will be young anew, the young will develop a beautiful countenance, white hair will all turn black, and lost teeth will grow back". Winter/north/purple zhi realgar zhi: they will "enjoy longevity coterminous with Heaven. Stabbing and slicing will not pierce them, nor will fire burn them, and submerging them in water will not [even] wet them. The five poisons will keep away from them, evil spirits will be dispelled, and they will not know hunger or thirst".

== Sanhuang neibi wen ==
The c. 10th- or 11th-century Bianshi sanshiliu zhong zhicao bianxing zhang (辯識三十六種芝草變形章; "Chapter on the Explanation and Discernment of the Thirty-Six Varieties of Mushroom Plants' Transformations of Form") is part of a larger section on mountain survival in the Sanhuang neibi wen (三皇內祕文; "Esoteric Secret Writ of the Three Sovereigns"). This source is a compilation of methods traditionally associated with the Sanhuang (三皇, Three Sovereigns) tradition, which was an integral part of the southern Jiangnan esoteric lore, including the mycological path to immortality, that Ge Hong documented in his Baopuzi. This chapter on mushrooms lists the names of four sets of nine numinous zhi mushrooms, divided according to where they grow (on sacred mountains, along riverbanks, in caves, or on withered trees) along with details of their respective appearances and benefits.

The two subsequent chapters in the Sanhuang neibi wen describe a list of thirty-six medicinal xianyao (仙藥; "herbs of immortality") and jingcao (精草; "essence-plants") (辯識三十六種仙藥形像章), and a talismanic seal of the dihuang (地皇; "Earthly Sovereign") by means of which practitioners can cause numinous herbs and mushrooms to manifest before them (地皇君服餌仙朮昇仙得道章).

== Taishang lingbao zhicao pin ==
The early 11th-century Song dynasty Taishang lingbao zhicao pin (太上靈寶芝草品; "Numinous Treasure Catalogue of Mushroom Plants"), contained in the 1444 Ming dynasty edition Daozang "Daoist canon", contains brief descriptions and illustrations of 127 types of numinous zhi. A 1598 Ming dynasty reprint includes woodblock pictures (see below), whose aesthetic appeal typifies the pu (譜; "catalogs; manuals") of uncommon objects compiled by Song and later literati.

The text uses botanical terms to describe the appearance of zhi (stalk, branch, leaf, root), depicts the habitats and the seasons suitable for growth, and reports zhi tastes, as well as methods of picking, preparing, and eating. Some illustrations even show the gills. Not all the 127 kinds of zhi have a unique name: twelve terms are used to name twenty-eight kinds of zhi, for example, five are named zizhi (紫芝; "purple mushroom"). Twenty-five of these zhi terms correspond with the Five Phases theory of jin (金; "Metal"), mu (木; "Wood"), shui (水; "Water"), huo (火; "Fire"), and tu (土; "Earth"). For instance, each phase name is compounded with -jingzhi (精芝; "-spirit zhi"), see jinjingzhi (金精芝; "metal spirit zhi") and mujingzhi (木精芝; "wood spirit zhi") below. One scholar divided the 127 types of zhi into six groups: single umbrella-shaped macrofungi (34 kinds), umbrella-shaped macrofungi in clusters (8), umbrella-shaped and cup-shaped macrofungi with branches on a stalk (12 kinds), umbrella-shaped macrofungi in layers (18 kinds), strange umbrella-shaped and cup-shaped macrofungi (29), and non-macrofungi (26 kinds).

For example, the gui junzhi (鬼菌芝; "ghost mushroom") entry says, "The ghost mushroom grows on the shady [north] side of famous mountains, and has a white lid shaped like cooking pot. Two ghosts who guard it will disappear if seen by a human. One should gather it at night, dry it in the shade for 100 days, and directly consume it in a single dose like a medicinal powder. The legendary Weaver Girl took one dose and became a xian transcendent who rose right up into heaven" (鬼菌芝生於名山之陰白蓋狀如甑二鬼守之見人即滅以夜採之陰乾百日食如刀圭所向盡服織女服之仙昇天矣). Despite the epigrammatic nature of its entries, the Taishang lingbao zhicao pin is exceptional on account of its "exhaustive scope and its vivid iconography". It was likely compiled as a throwback to the lost illustrated mycological inventories mentioned in the Baopuzi, and in faithfully emulating these early sources, the text "established itself an enduring paragon of the genre".

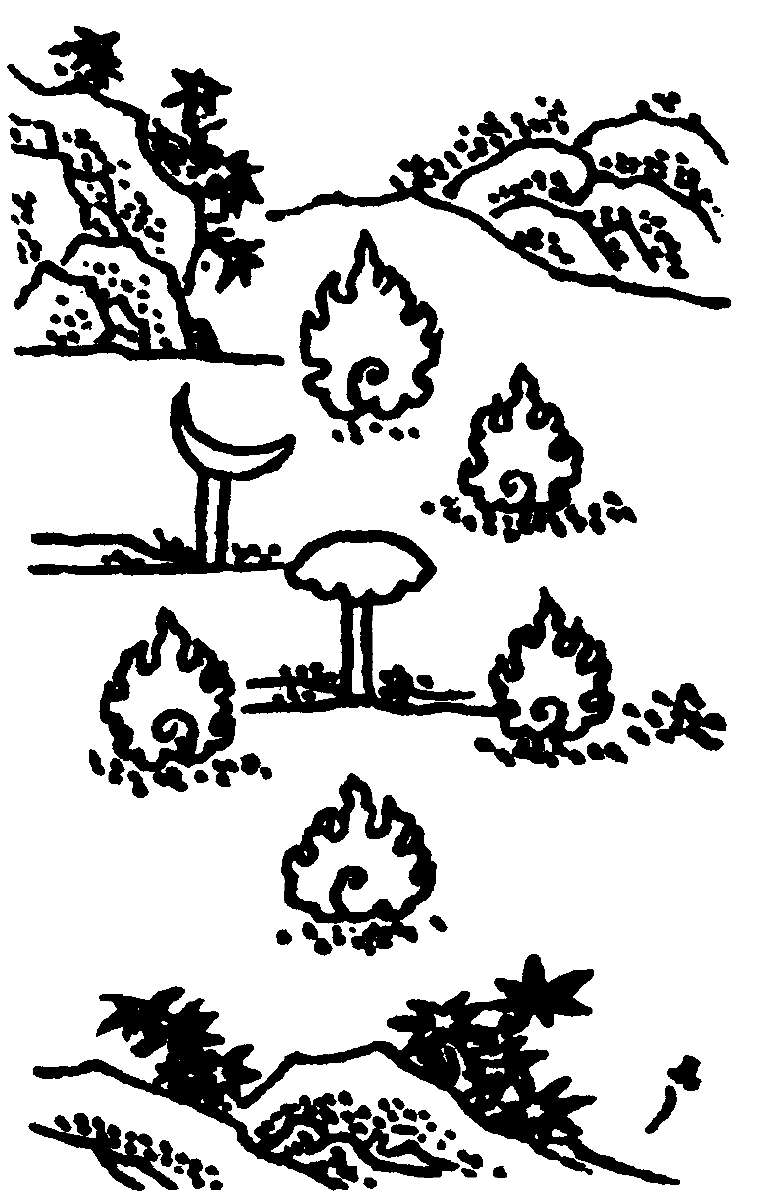
Metal spirit zhi (金精芝) giving off vermillion flames

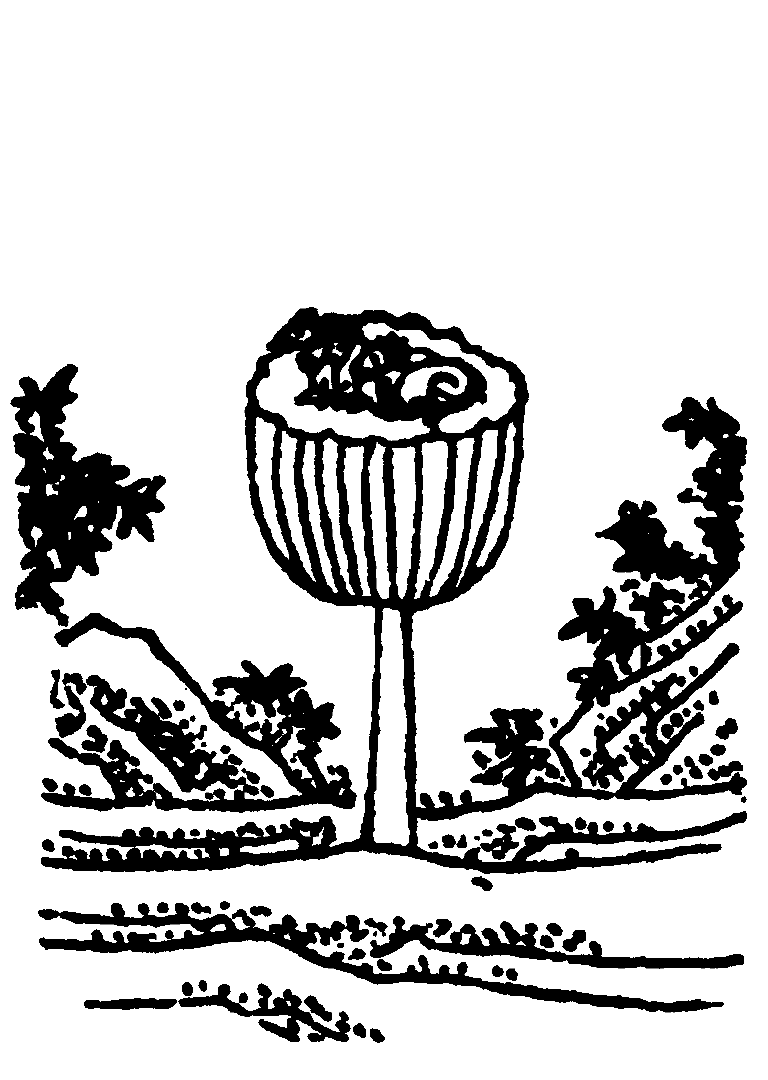
Wood spirit zhi (木精芝) with three horses on top

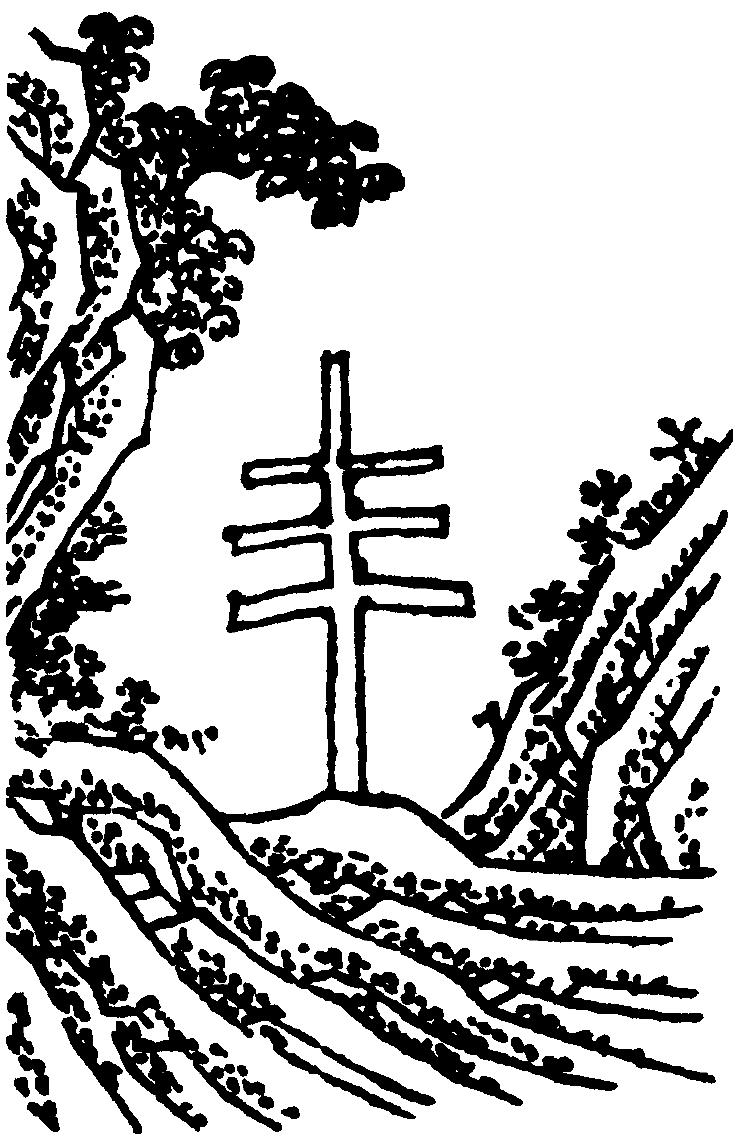
White jade zhi (白玉芝) with three red stalks

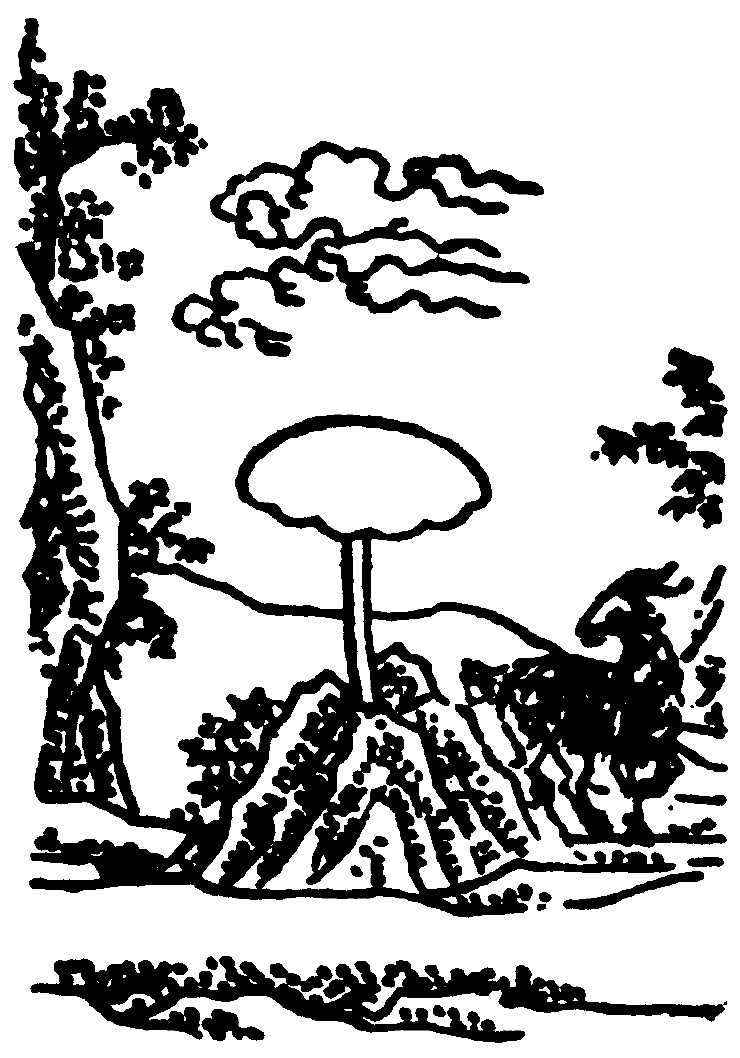
Heavenly heart zhi (天心芝) with a red cloud and a white sheep

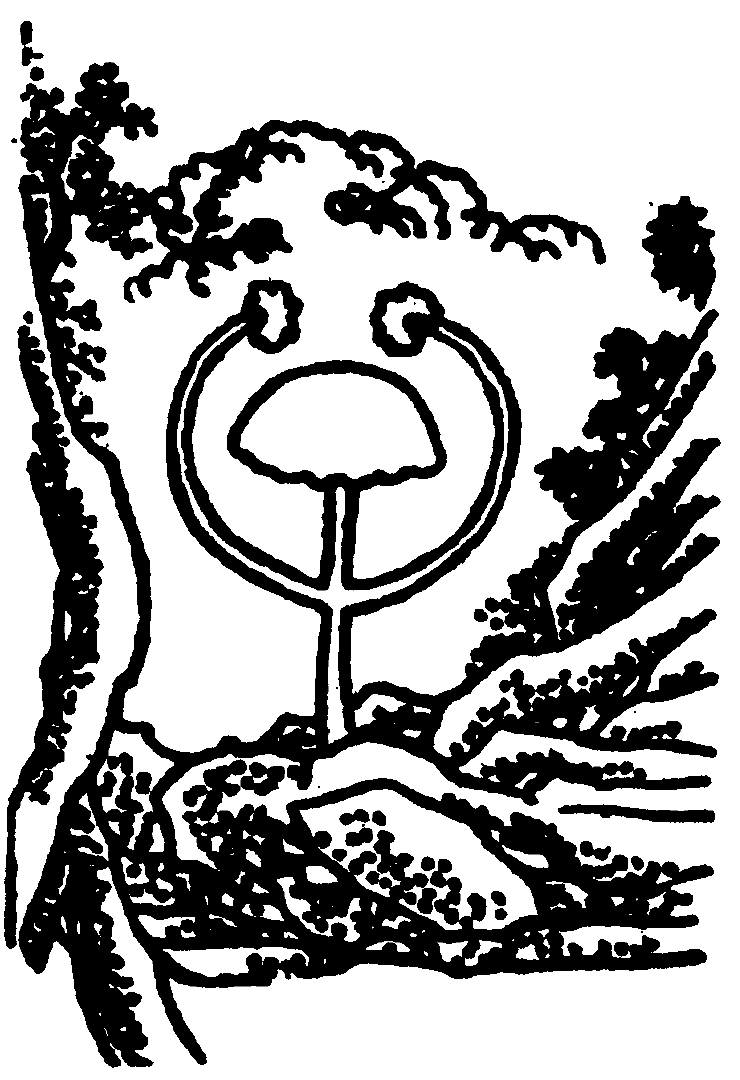
Heavenly eyes zhi (天目芝) covered by a black cloud

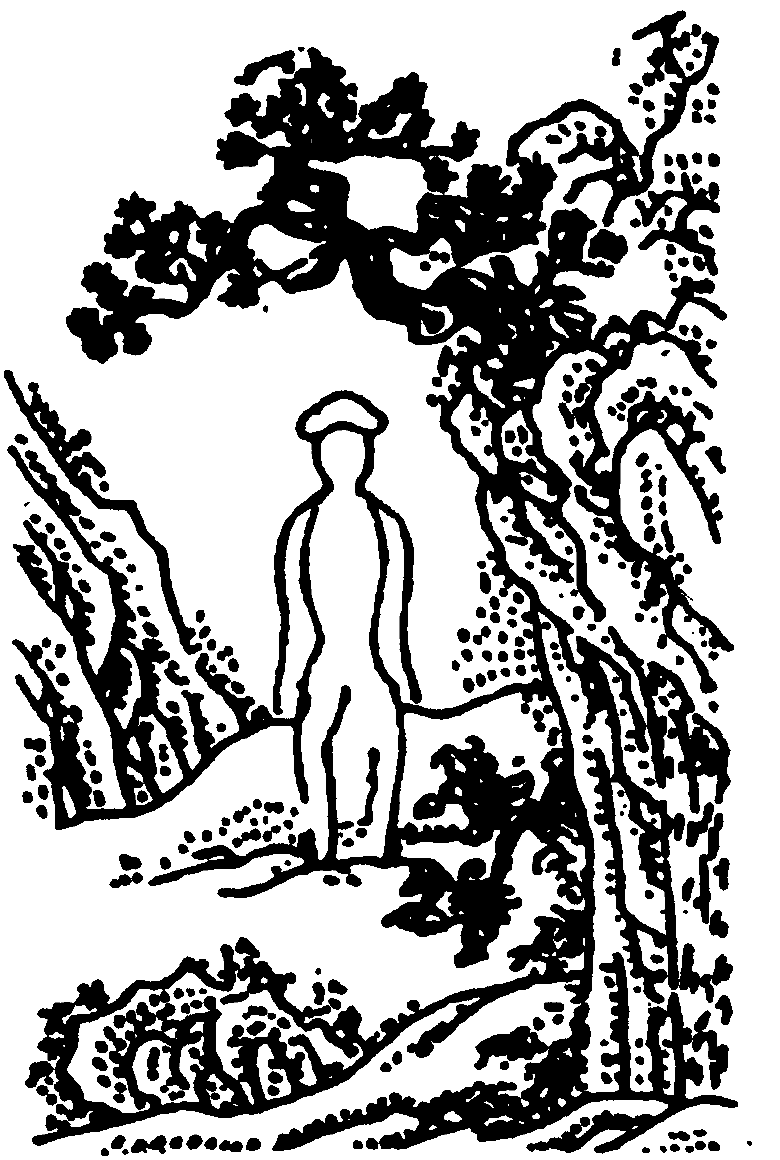
Human intimidating zhi (人威芝) shaped like a red person with a red cap

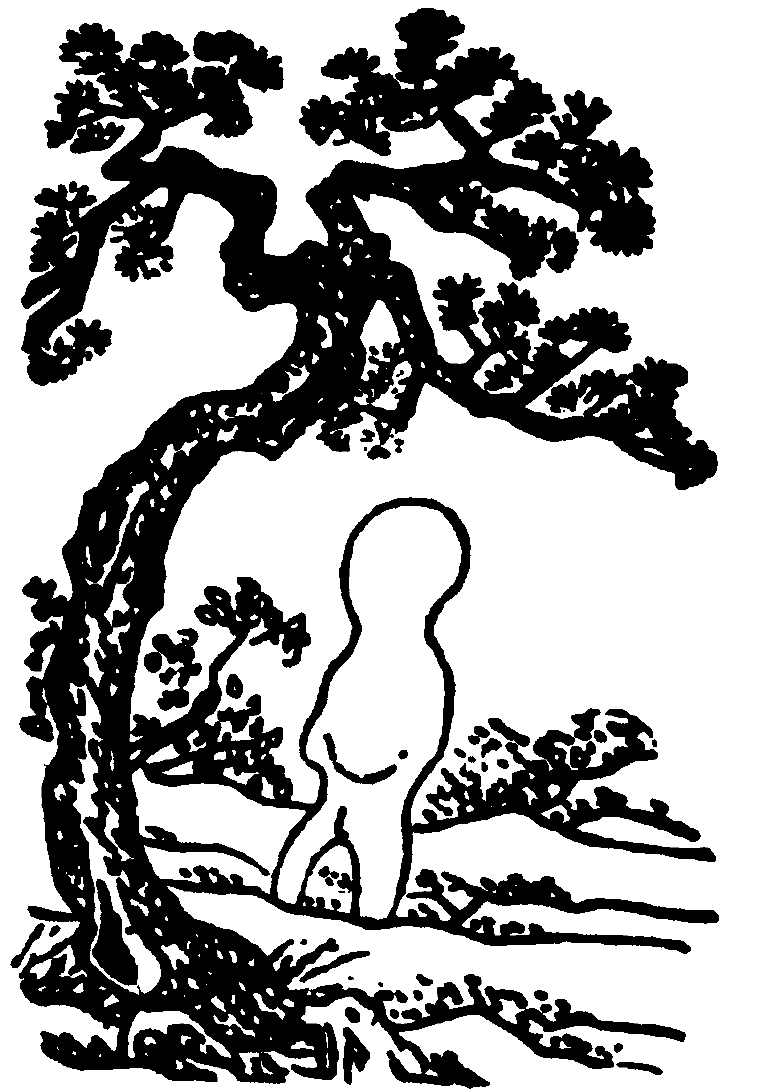
Red pine-nut zhi (赤松子芝) resembles a red person

Ghost mushroom zhi (鬼菌芝) guarded by two ghosts

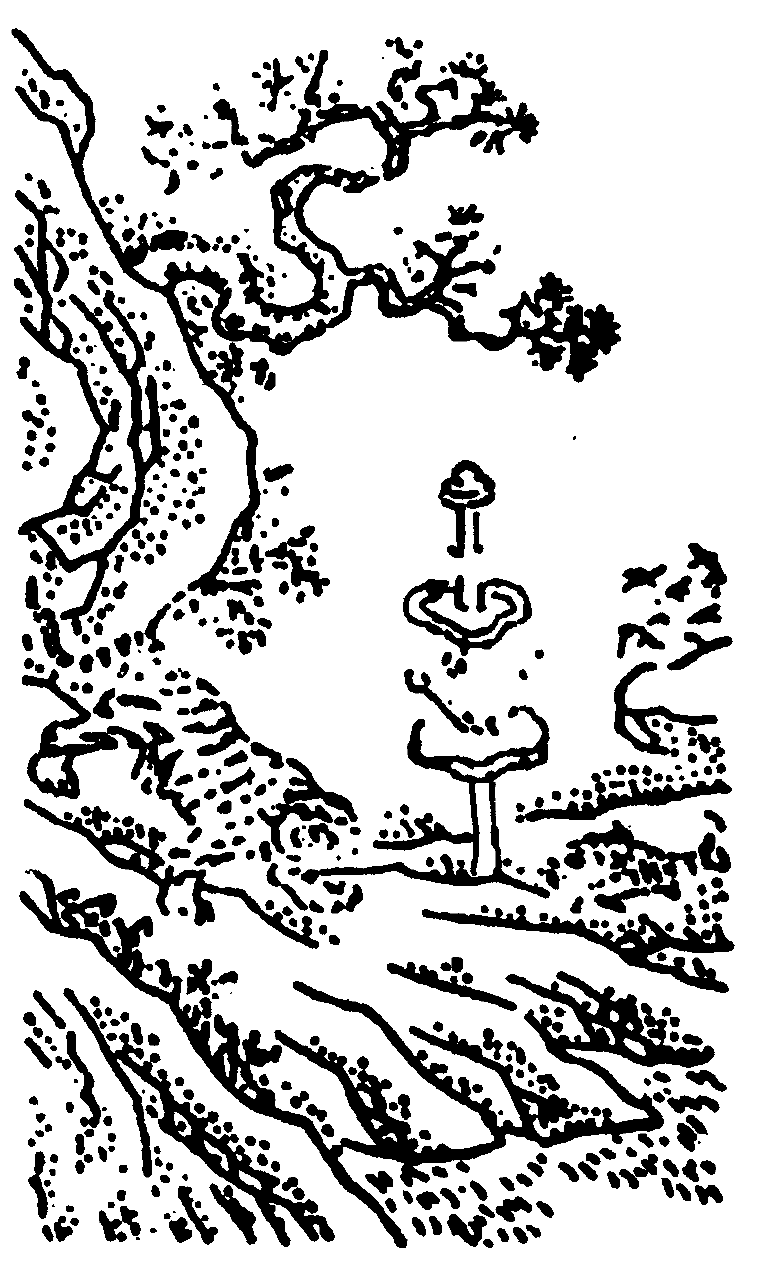
Yellow jade zhi (黄玉芝) guarded by a yellow tiger and fish

North region zhi (北方芝) shaped like a red snake

== Pharmacopeias ==
Daoist metaphors originally associated with supernatural zhi excrescences were gradually lost, resulting in more "secular" views. Some pharmacopoeias that incorporated the zhi may have played a role in this process, as the term zhi became identified with common mushrooms, resulting in an emphasis on their healing properties.

The (ca. 1st or 2nd century CE) Shennong bencao jing (Divine Farmer's Classic of Pharmaceutics) classifies zhi into six color types, each of which is believed to benefit the qi "Life Force" in a different part of the body: qingzhi (青芝; "Green Mushroom") for Liver, chizhi (赤芝; "Red Mushroom") for Heart, huangzhi (黃芝; "Yellow Mushroom") for Spleen, baizhi (白芝; "White Mushroom") for Lungs, heizhi ("Black Mushroom") for Kidneys, and zizhi (紫芝; "Purple Mushroom") for Essence. According to the Chinese mycologist Zhao Jiding (趙繼鼎), Green zhi refers to Coriolus versicolor, Red zhi to Ganoderma lucidum, Yellow zhi to Laetiporus sulphureus, White zhi to Fomitopsis officinalis, Black zhi to Amauroderma rugosum or Polyporus melanopus, and Purple zhi to Ganoderma sinense.

The (1596) Bencao Gangmu (Compendium of Materia Medica) has a zhi (芝) category that includes the same green, red, yellow, white, black, and purple liuzhi (六芝; "Six Mushrooms") and sixteen other fungi, mushrooms, and lichens, such as the mu'er (木耳; 'wood ear'; "Auricularia polytricha"). The Bencao Gangmu author Li Shizhen classified these six differently colored zhi as Xiancao (仙草; "immortality herbs"), and described the effects of chizhi "red mushroom": "It positively affects the life-energy, or Qi of the heart, repairing the chest area and benefiting those with a knotted and tight chest. Taken over a long period of time, the agility of the body will not cease, and the years are lengthened to those of the Immortal Fairies."

The Bencao Gangmu does not list lingzhi as a variety of zhi, but as an alternate name for the shi'er (石耳; 'stone ear'; "Umbilicaria esculenta lichen"). According to George Ashur Stuart and Frederick Porter Smith, "[The 石耳] is edible, and has all of the good qualities of the 芝 ([zhi]), it is also being used in the treatment of gravel, and said to benefit virility. It is specially used in hemorrhage from the bowels and prolapse of the rectum".

Chinese pharmaceutical handbooks on zhi mushrooms were the first illustrated publications in the history of mycology. The historian of Chinese science Joseph Needham discussed a lost illustrated text from the Liang dynasty (502–587) called Zhong Shenzhi (種神芝; "On the Planting and Cultivation of Magic Mushrooms"). "The pictures of mushrooms, in particular, must have been an extremely early landmark in the history of mycology, which was a late-developing science in the West. The title of [this book] shows that fungi of some kind were being regularly cultivated – hardly as food, with that special designation, more probably medicinal, conceivably hallucinogenic."

Pharmaceutical substances categorized as hallucinogens typically tend to induce an altered state of consciousness with well-known qualities, such as sensations of flying, images of visiting places with fantastic features and inhabitants, dissolution of person and merging with a cosmic all, and other transcendent experiences of self, space, and time -- along with various culturally-specific facets. Ge Hong's Baopuzi suffered through the vicissitudes of time and chance and has not survived as a complete work; however, evidence of the pharmacological qualities of certain zhi excrescences have survived through incorporation of a Baopuzi excerpt into the Encyclopedia of Literary Collections (藝文類聚; Yiwen Leiju). These not-so-specific descriptions evidence the hallucinogenic qualities of least the mushroom type of zhi. Centuries later, the Taiping Yulan (太平御覽) provides further evidence of belief in the ability of zhi excrescences to alter the normal time-space continuum.

== Sources ==
- Campany, Robert Ford (2002), To Live as Long as Heaven and Earth: A Translation and Study of Ge Hong's Traditions of Divine Transcendents, University of California Press.
- Fan, Ping Li Chen (October 2021). "Hallucinogen Use in China" (PDF). Sino-Platonic Papers (318).
- Feifel, Eugene (1946). "Pao-p'u tzu nei-p'ien". Monumenta Serica. 11: 1–32. doi:10.1080/02549948.1946.11744875.
- Halpern, George M. (2007). Healing Mushrooms. Square One.
- The Songs of the South: An Anthology of Ancient Chinese Poems by Qu Yuan and Other Poets. Translated by Hawkes, David. Penguin. 1985.
- Karlgren, Bernhard (1957). Grammata Serica Recensa. Museum of Far Eastern Antiquities.
- Kroll, Paul K. (2017). A Student's Dictionary of Classical and Medieval Chinese (rev. ed.). Brill.
- Sacred Books of China, the Li Ki. 2 vols. Translated by Legge, James. Oxford University Press. 1885.
- Little, Stephen; Eichman, Shawn (2000). Taoism and the Arts of China. The Art Institute of Chicago.
- Lu Di (2013). "Ancient Chinese People's Knowledge of Macrofungi during the Period from 220 to 589". East Asian Science, Technology, and Medicine. 37: 36–68. doi:10.1163/26669323-03701004. ISSN 1562-918X. Archived from the original on 2015-02-27.
- The Huainanzi: A Guide to the Theory and Practice of Government in Early Han China. Translated by Major, John S.; Queen, Sarah; Meyer, Andrew; D. Roth, Harold. Columbia University Press. 2010.
- Miura, Kunio (2008). "Dongtian and fudi 洞天 • 福地 Grotto-Heavens and Blissful Lands". In Fabrizio Pregadio (ed.). The Encyclopedia of Taoism. pp. 368–372.
- Needham, Joseph; Lu Gwei-Djen (1974). Science and Civilisation in China. Vol. 5: Chemistry and Chemical Technology. Part 2: Spagyrical Discovery and Inventions: Magisteries of Gold and Immortality. Cambridge University Press.
- Needham, Joseph; Ho Ping-Yü; Lu Gwei-Djen (1976). Science and Civilisation in China. Vol. V: Chemistry and Chemical Technology. Part 3: Spagyrical Discovery and Invention: Historical Survey, from Cinnabar Elixirs to Synthetic Insulin. Cambridge University Press.
- Needham, Joseph; Lu Gwei-Djen (1986). Science and Civilisation in China: Biology and biological technology. Botany, Volume 6, Part 1. Cambridge University Press.
- Pregadio, Fabrizio (2000). "Elixirs and Alchemy". In Livia Kohn (ed.). Daoism Handbook. E. J. Brill. pp. 165–195.
- Pregadio, Fabrizio (2008). "Zhi 芝 "numinous mushrooms"; "excrescences"". In Fabrizio Pregadio (ed.). The Encyclopedia of Taoism. Routledge. pp. 1271–1274.
- Schipper, Kristofer (1993). The Taoist Body. Translated by Karen C. Duval. University of California Press.
- Steavu, Dominic (2018). "The Marvelous Fungus and The Secret of Divine Immortals" (PDF). Micrologus: Nature, Sciences and Medieval Societies, Longevity and Immortality Europe-Islam-Asia. Vol. 26. pp. 353–383.
- Strickmann, Michel (1979). "On the Alchemy of Tao Hung-ching". In Holmes Welch; Anna K. Seidel (eds.). Facets of Taoism: Essays in Chinese Religion. Yale University Press. pp. 123–192.
- Stuart, George Ashur; Smith, F. Porter (1911). Chinese materia medica; vegetable kingdom. Shanghai: American Presbyterian Mission Press.
- Unschuld, Paul U. (1985). Medicine in China: A History of Ideas. University of California Press.
- Ware, James R. (1966). Alchemy, Medicine and Religion in the China of A.D. 320: The Nei Pien of Ko Hung. Dover.
- Yang, Shouzhong (1998). The Divine Farmer's Materia Medica: A Translation of the Shen Nong Ben Cao Jing. Blue Poppy.
