= Frederick Porter Smith =

British medical missionary (1833–1888)

Frederick Porter Smith (1833–1888) was one of the first British medical missionaries to China, in the 19th century. The Wesleyan Missionary Committee sent him to Hankow, China, for both philanthropic and evangelical reasons late in 1863.

== Writings ==
He wrote several books on China while there and after his return; his 1871 work is only the second English-language work to mention soybean sprouts. Smith also reported on the use of tobacco and of opium in his territory, opining that moderate opium use was "not incompatible with the health of those who practice it".

== Works ==
- The Rivers of China (1869)
- A Vocabulary Of Proper Names, In Chinese And English: Of Places, Persons, Tribes, And Sects, In China, Japan, Korea, Annam, Siam, Burma (1870)
- Frederick Porter Smith (1871). Contributions Towards the Materia Medica and Natural History of China. American Presbyterian Mission Press.
- Chinese Materia Medica: Vegetable Kingdom (1911) (with George Arthur Stuart)
