= Te-Tzu Chang =

Chinese agricultural and environmental scientist

Te-Tzu Chang 張德慈
- Born: April 3, 1927; Shanghai, China
- Died: March 24, 2006 (aged 78)
- Education: Saint John's University; University of Nanking (BSA, 1949); Cornell University (MSc, 1954); University of Minnesota (PhD, 1959)
- Known for: rice
- Awards: John Scott Award (1969); Tyler Prize for Environmental Achievement (1999)
- Scientific career
- Fields: Agricultural science Environmental science
- Workplaces: IRRI
- Author abbrev. (botany): T.T.Chang

Te-Tzu Chang or T. T. Chang (simplified Chinese: 张德慈; traditional Chinese: 張德慈; pinyin: Zhāng Décí; 1927–2006) was a Chinese agricultural and environmental scientist.

== Biography ==
Chang was born in Shanghai on April 3, 1927 to a "scholar-gentry" family. Chang's father graduated from the Saint John's University in Shanghai and won the Boxer Rebellion Indemnity Scholarship Program and completed his study in the United States. Chang had three (older) sisters and one (younger) brother.

Chang finished his secondary education at the Saint John's School (a middle school afflicted to the Saint John's University) in Shanghai. Chang at beginning studied agricultural science at the Saint John's University in Shanghai, which was his father's alma mater. After about one year, Chang transferred to the University of Nanking in Nanjing and majored in agriculture and horticulture. Chang graduated from University of Nanking with BSA in 1949.

After graduation, Chang worked for the Council of Agriculture in Guangzhou, the capital city of Guangdong Province. During this period of time Shen Tsung-han (1895–1980, 沈宗瀚, born Ningbo, Zhejiang; death Taipei, Taiwan) was one of his mentors. Shen was the second and former Director-general of the Council of Agriculture.

In 1950, Chang moved to Taiwan and served as a technician in the Ministry of Agriculture. Recommended by Shen, in 1952 Chang went to study plant genetics at Cornell University which was also the alma mater of Shen (Shen received his PhD from Cornell). Chang obtained his MSc from Cornell in 1954 and continued his study at the University of Minnesota where he earned PhD in plant genetics in 1959.

Chang went back to Taiwan in 1959. However, after two years of staying in Taiwan, Chang moved to Philippines and worked for the International Rice Research Institute (IRRI) in Los Baños, Laguna. From 1962 to 1991, Chang managed the International Rice Germplasm Center.

The T. T. Chang Genetic Resources Center is named after him.

== Awards and honors ==
List of awards and honors received by Chang:

- In 1969, John Scott Award, Philadelphia, USA
- In 1978, Fellow, American Society of Agronomy (ASA)
- In 1980, International Service in Agronomy Award, American Society of Agronomy (ASA)
- In 1982, Fellow and Chartered Biologist, Institute of Biology, UK
- In 1985, Honorary Fellow, Crop Science Society of the Philippines
- In 1985, Fellow, Crop Science Society of America (CSSA)
- In 1986, Outstanding Achievement Award, University of Minnesota, USA
- In 1988, Rank Prize in Agronomy and Nutrition, Rank Prize Foundation, UK
- In October 1990, Frank N. Meyer Award and Medal in Plant Germplasm, Cactus and Succulent Society of America (CSSA), USA
- In 1990, Honorary Research Fellow, China National Rice Research Institute, and China Academy of Agriculture & Forestry, P.R.China
- In 1991, International Service in Crop Science Award, Crop Science Society of America (CSSA), USA
- In 1993, Honorary Fellow, Society for the Advancement of Breeding Research in Asia and Oceania (SABRAO)
- In 1994, SINAG Award (Guiding Light Award), IRRI, Philippines
- In 1994, Foreign Member, United States National Academy of Sciences (NAS), USA
- In 1996, Fellow, National Academy of Agricultural Sciences, India
- In 1996, Academician, Academia Sinica, Taipei
- In 1996, Member, TWAS, the Academy of Sciences for the Developing World
- On April 18, 1997, Fellow, Pontifical Academy of Sciences, Vatican City
- In 1999, Tyler Prize for Environmental Achievement
