= Bi Jilong =

Chinese diplomat

Bi Jilong (Chinese: 毕季龙; 1914-5/30/2007), (original name Bi Qinfang), was a Chinese diplomat and the second Chinese Under-Secretary-General of United Nations.

== Early life ==
Bi was born in Shanghai to a local leading family. His father, Bi Yihong, was a staff member of the embassy of the Qing Dynasty in Singapore, and later the editor of Eastern Times in Shanghai. His maternal grandfather, Yang Yunshi, was in the Consul of the Qing Dynasty to Singapore. Bi's family was losing their financial position during his childhood, and he went to live with his uncle in Yangzhou, where he attended Yangzhou High school. He graduated from National Central University and worked in several agencies of the Nationalist government as well as Yingshi University.
