= Danyang East railway station =

Railway station in Jiangsu, China

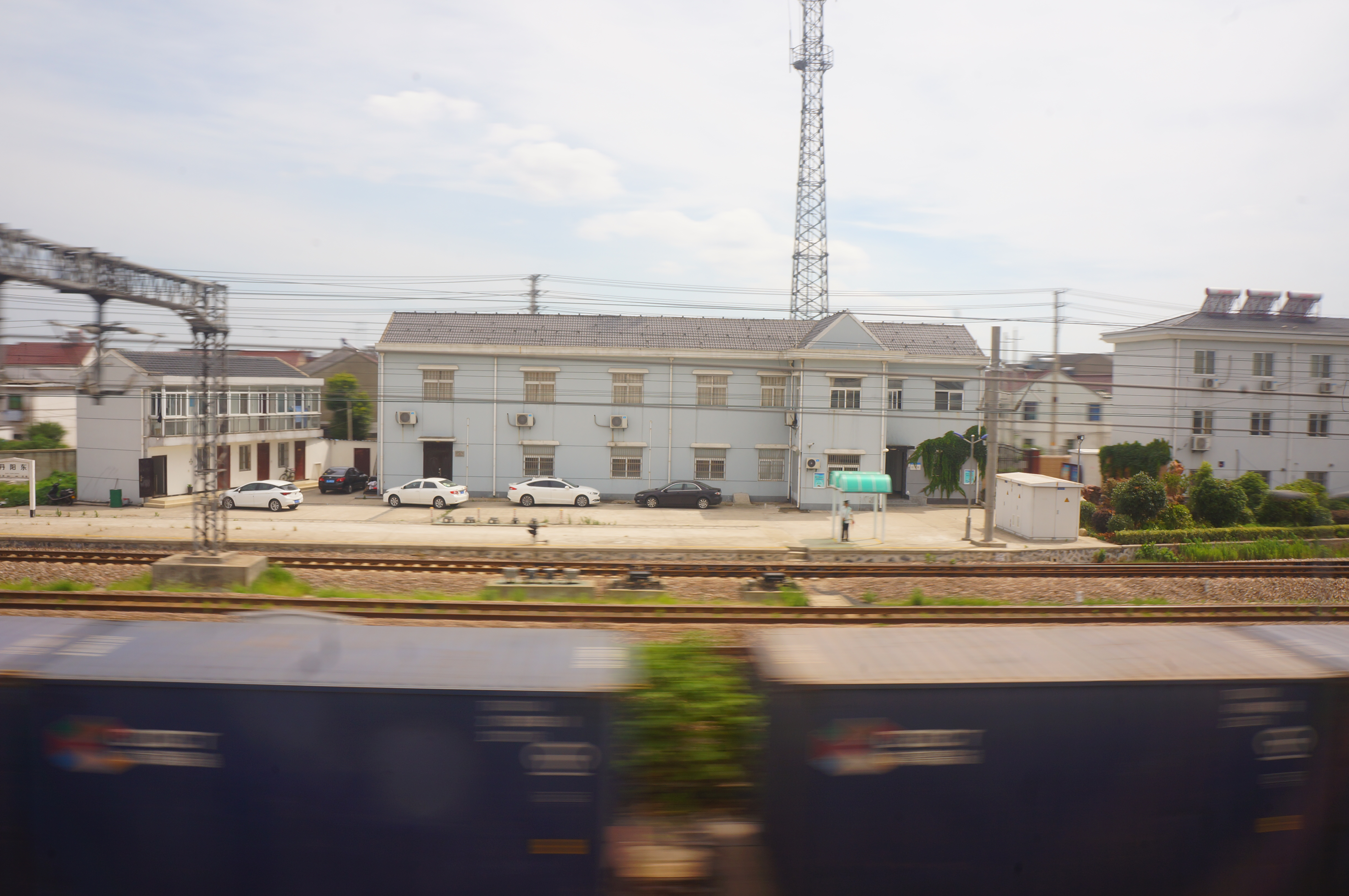

General information
- Location: China
- Coordinates: 31.956679°N 119.648708°E
- System: Railway station
- Line: Shanghai-Nanjing Intercity Railway
Location
- Location within Jiangsu

Danyang East railway station, was called Linkou railway station, is a reserved railway station of Shanghai–Nanjing intercity railway located in Jiangsu, People's Republic of China. Currently it's a freight station of Beijing–Shanghai railway, as well as its passenger services closed in 2003.
