= Li Ruiqing =

Li Ruiqing (李瑞清; 1867–1920) was a Chinese artist, calligrapher and educator. He is also known by the style name Meian (梅庵). He was a pioneering influential educator in China's modern history, the founder of China's modern art education.

Li Ruiqing was appointed the president of Liang Jiang Higher Normal School (Nanjing University) in 1906. He reformed scholastic instruction, and established the Faculty of Drawing & Handcraft at the school. He also started art education in Chinese modern institutions of higher learning.

Li Ruiqing is the originator of Jinshi Calligraphy School (金石書派, Jin Shi Shu Pai).
