= Chen Chung-hwan =

Chen Chung-hwan (1905–1992, 陳忠寰, autonym 陳康, Pinyin: Chen Kang) was a scholar of ancient Greek and Western philosophy.

In 1924, Chen attended National Southeastern University (later renamed Nanjing University in mainland China and reinstated in Taiwan) and graduated from the Department of Philosophy in 1929. He then studied at the University of London in 1930, and later at Berlin University under professors Werner Jaeger, Nicolai Hartmann and Julius Stenzel. He received his doctorate in 1940. After teaching at the National Southwestern Union University (Kunming, Yunan Province), National Central University (in Chongqing beginning in 1941, and Nanjing), and the National Taiwan University in Taipei until 1958, Chen emigrated to the United States, where he taught at Emory University, Long Island University, University of Texas at Austin, and the University of South Florida before retiring in the early 1980s. He died in Oxnard, California.

== Works ==
- Das Chorismos-Problem bei Aristoteles, Berlin: A. Limbach, 1940.
- Sophia, The Science Aristotle Sought, Hildesheim; Georg Olms, 1975.
- "On the Parmenides of Plato", The Classical Quarterly, 38, 1944, pp. 101-114.
- "On Aristotle's Metaphysics K 7, 1064 a29", Phronesis, 6, 1961, pp. 53-58.
- "Universal Concrete, a Typical Aristotelian Duplication of Reality", Phronesis, 9, 1964, pp. 48-57.
- Acquiring Knowledge of the Ideas: A Study of Plato’s Methods in the Phaedo, the Symposium and the Central Books of the Republic. F. Steiner, 1992.
