= Dan D. Yang =

Chinese optical physicist (born 1965)

- Born: Dan Dan Yang; June 13, 1965 (age 61); Nanjing, Jiangsu, China
- Occupations: Mother, Educator, Inventor, Entrepreneur
- Years active: 1996–present
- Children: 2

Dan D. Yang (Chinese: 杨丹) is the founder of VINCI Education, founding principal of VINCI Schools, and the Creator of VINCI Blended Learning Curriculum, a new category of learning tools and education services based on brain science, blended pedagogy and technology integration, focusing on early and primary education.

== Early life ==
Born Dan Dan meaning very red in Chinese by her father who was classified as a black sheep during the Culture Revolution in China, Yang was the first grand child of an entrepreneurial family of 6 sons and 2 daughters; her grandfather owned a boat factory and operated a transport business on the imperial canal which connects north and south China, but were forced to relocate to rural China during the Culture Revolution. Her father tested airplane motors initially but self-taught and grew to lead the operations of a joint venture between his factory and Japanese motorcycle maker Suzuki. Her mother was a technician at a state-owned factory which produced electronic tubes for China's first satellite launch. Yang took a bachelor's degree in physics at Nanjing University in 1982. She continued her post-graduate education in France winning one of the top state sponsored scholarships, at the Paris-Sud 11 University and earned her master's and doctor degrees.

In 2000, she made a $1 million donation to Nanjing University for the construction of a student center. She named the activity center after her late father and has also established a scholarship in his name.

== Career ==
In 1991, Yang began her career teaching Optics and Photonics at the École nationale supérieure d'arts et métiers in Paris, a historic school built by Napoleon that was mainly used for adult education programs. She immigrated to Canada, in 1993, and worked at MPB Technology on long distance fiber optic networking. In 1996, she started her first company, AFC Technologies, in Hull which is now part of the Gatineau municipality in National Capital Region (Canada). During her time with AFC Technologies, she received five patents on the subject. Yang is credited with inventing a L-band amplifier and bringing it to market ahead of others between 1997 and 1999 and "crowned" by the industry insiders as the Queen of EDFA (Erbium Doped Fiber Amplifier). Ultimately, one of her inventions a broadband source (BBS) became the standard equipment for component manufacturers as well as for optical sensor and medical tomography research. In addition, Nortel employed another one of her inventions, which allowed doubling the signal traffic in a fiber—a technology still used for long distance or wide area telephony and data transport. AFC Technologies was acquired by JDSU in 1999.

Yang then earned graduate certificates in a 3-month Stanford University's business administration program in 2000, while starting up her second venture, Dowslake Microsystems.

== Entrepreneurial and investment experience ==
Yang has founded 2 startups in optical networking prior to founding VINCI Education. She also had experience acquiring a German public company Pandatel, and made other international acquisitions in Asia. As a limited partner of Storm Ventures and eGarden Ventures, she made investment in other technology startups covering wireless, biotech, computing and other technology areas.

In 2011, Forbes enlisted Yang as one of the Top 10 Female Entrepreneurs/Mompreneurs to Watch

She has written articles on mobile revolution and telecom investing and been the subject of other industry articles.

== Patents and inventions ==
Yang is an author or co-author of over 20 patents granted or filed with the United States Patent and Trademark Office. Her inventions include following categories over the years:

2010 to present: Educational and instructional tools, curriculum, and software

1996-2009: Networking hardware and software

== Litigation ==
In 2015, Yang fought a residential developer for the loss of sea view from her investment property in Discovery Bay. She was sold the property with a promise of ocean view which was subsequently blocked by the developer's new block adjacent to hers. The judge dismissed her case for the lack of sound evidence. The regulation however has since changed forbidding property developers to lure buyers using inflated statements.

== Awards ==
- 1998: Photonics Circle of Excellence 1998
- 1999: Mecuriades 1999 Young Entrepreneur of the year
- 2013: EDDIE Award by CompuED Magazine as Best Early Learning Solution
- 2013: Consumer Electronics Show 2013 Innovation Award Honoree for VINCI Curriculum the learning programs for toddler, preschool and kindergarten
- 2014: American Business Award Gold as New Product Development Executive of the Year
- 2014: American Software and Information Industry Association CODIE Award for Best Game-based Learning Curriculum

== Personal life ==
Yang was married from 1990 to 2016, mother of 2 daughters born in 1995 and 2009 respectively. She divorced in 2016 after 26 years of marriage to Zibin Lu, whom she met while studying in Paris, France.
