= Choh Hao Li =

Chinese-American biochemist (1913–1987)

- Born: April 21, 1913; Guangzhou, Guangdong, China
- Died: November 28, 1987 (aged 74); Berkeley, California, U.S.
- Education: Nanjing University; University of California, Berkeley
- Known for: Discovering and synthesizing the human pituitary growth hormone
- Spouse: Shen-hwai Lu (Annie)
- Awards: Albert Lasker Award for Basic Medical Research (1962); William H. Nichols Medal (1979)
- Scientific career
- Fields: Biochemist
- Workplaces: University of California

Choh Hao Li (sometimes Cho Hao Li) (Chinese: 李卓皓; pinyin: Lǐ Zhuōhào; April 21, 1913 – November 28, 1987) was a Chinese-born American biochemist who discovered in 1966 that human pituitary growth hormone (somatotropin) consists of a chain of 256 amino acids. In 1970, he succeeded in synthesizing this hormone, the largest protein molecule synthesized up to that time.

== Life and career ==
Li was born in Guangzhou and educated at the Nanjing University. In 1935, he immigrated to the US, where he took up postgraduate studies at the University of California, Berkeley, and later joined the staff. He became professor in 1950. He served as Director of the Hormone Research Laboratory at Berkeley from 1950 to 1967 and at UCSF from 1967 until his retirement in 1983. In 1955, he was elected as Academician of Academia Sinica, Republic of China.

Li dedicated his entire academic career studying the pituitary-gland hormones. In collaboration with various co-workers, he isolated several protein hormones, including adrenocorticotropic hormone (ACTH), which stimulates the adrenal cortex to increase its secretion of corticoids. In 1956, Li and his group showed that ACTH consists of 39 amino acids arranged in a specific order, and that the whole chain of the natural hormone is not necessary for its action. He isolated another pituitary hormone called melanocyte-stimulating hormone (MSH) and found that not only does this hormone produce some effects similar to those produced by ACTH, but also that part of the amino acid chain of MSH is the same as that of ACTH.

== Scientific achievements ==
In 1940, Li successfully purified the luteinizing hormone from sheep pituitary glands. The whole process included grinding thousands of glands, extracting the hormone, and then identifying its chemistry and biology at the molecular level. This was a breakthrough in biological studies.

Eight of the nine hormones secreted by the anterior pituitary were isolated and identified by Li and his research team. These nine hormones can be divided into three groups based on the similarity of their chemical properties and biological activities.

The first group includes adrenocorticotropic hormone (ACTH), melanocyte-stimulating hormones (MSH), and lipotropin.

- 1953 - Li was the first to isolate and extract ACTH.
- 1964 - Li and his research team discovered and isolated lipotropin, and its structure was defined in 1965.
- 1975 - Li discovered β-endorphin when trying to find β-lipotropin in camel brain. The team isolated human β-endorphin in 1976 and synthesized it to study its biological activity after they defined the structure of β-endorphin.

The second group includes follicle stimulating hormone (FSH), luteinizing hormone (LH), and thyroid stimulating hormone (TSH).

- 1974 - Li and his team sequenced human LH and TSH.

The third group includes growth hormone and prolactin.

- 1944 - Li was the first person to isolate growth hormone from cow brains. The lack of function of cow growth hormone on human body motivated Dr. Li to find human growth hormone.
- 1956 - Li successfully isolated human and monkey growth hormone and demonstrated its efficacy to treat hypopituitary children.
- 1969 - Li discovered the complete primary structure of sheep prolactin.
- 1970 - Li synthesized proteins with human growth hormone activity.

== Awards ==
Li was an expert in diversified areas, including endocrinology, biochemistry, and peptide synthesis. He not only was a widely recognized leader in pituitary-secreted research for his contribution in hormone and growth factors, but also greatly advanced the field of protein chemistry. All of his research had direct impact on clinical applications, especially in growth and fertility. It is estimated that he had published more than 1,000 research papers and had collaborated with more than 300 people. In addition, he was also the recipient of a lot of honors (more than 25). The most significant ones are as follows:

- 1947 - the Ciba Award from the Endocrine Society
- 1951 - the Award of American Chemical Society
- 1955 - the Amory Prize of American Academy of Arts and Sciences
- 1962 - the first Albert Lasker Award for Basic Medical Research
- 1970 - the Scientific Achievement Award from American Medical Association
- 1971 - the National Award of the American Cancer Society
- 1972 - the Nicholas Andry Award from the Association of Bone and Joint Surgeons
- 1977 - the Lewis Price of the American Philosophical Society
- 1979 - the William H. Nichols Medal of the American Chemical Society
- 1981 - the Koch Award of the Endocrine Society
- 1987 - the Alan E. Pierce Award (now R. Bruce Merrifield Award) from American Peptide Society

Li was elected to the following academies:

- 1958 - Academician of Academia Sinica
- 1963 - Member of the American Academy of Arts and Sciences
- 1973 - Member of the United States National Academy of Sciences
- 1978 - Foreign Member of Chilean Academy of Sciences
- 1984 - Foreign Member of Indian Institute of Science

== 10 Honorary Degrees ==
- 1962 - Catholic University of Chile
- 1970 - Chinese University of Hong Kong
- 1971 - (the year the synthesis of Human Growth Hormone was announced)
  - University of the Pacific
  - Marquette University
  - Saint Peter's College
- 1977 - University of Uppsala, Sweden
- 1978 - University of San Francisco
- 1979 - Long Island University
- 1981 - University of Colorado
- 1982 - Medical College of Pennsylvania

== The Establishment of Institute of Biological Chemistry, Academia Sinica ==
Despite his significant scientific achievements, Dr. Li was also dedicated to the initiation and development of protein research in Taiwan. In spring 1958, Dr. Li was invited by Dr. Shih Hu to lecture a three-week course regarding the newly developed technology in protein chemistry and his latest pituitary gland research at National Taiwan University with the support from China Foundation for the Promotion of Education and Culture. At that time, the academic community only knew that protein research was developing rapidly abroad and a scholar had already made extraordinary achievements, and so when Dr. Li introduced the first-hand knowledge, it really attracted and inspired domestic scientists. Dr. Li believed that the protein chemistry was the foundation of future biochemical and biological sciences research, so he decided to assist the establishment of domestic protein research institute. In order to cultivate talents in Taiwan, Dr. Li personally provided scholarships and selected and persuaded scholars who have settled in Taiwan to continue the research in his or other research institutes. With the support from Academia Sinica, National Science Council, Ministry of Education, and National Taiwan University, Institute of Biological Chemistry and Institute of Biochemical Sciences, College of Life Science, National Taiwan University were established in 1972. The two institutes were originally located in the National Taiwan University's campus (Institutes of Biological Chemistry moved to Academia Sinica's campus later) to integrate research institutes and the University. Dr. Li had always been serving the chief consultant to assist the collaboration of the two institutes and international networking. The achievement of the two institutes today are built on Dr. Li's hard work. Dr. Li's foresight also brought about the domestic development of biotechnology and genetic engineering.

== Sources ==
- Cole, R D (1996), "Choh Hao Li: April 21, 1913 - November 28, 1987", Biographical Memoirs of the National Academy of Sciences, vol. 70, pp. 221–39, PMID 11619324
- Hruby, Victor J.; Yamashiro, Donald (1988), "Memorial issue in honor of Professor Choh Hao Li. Part I", Int. J. Pept. Protein Res, vol. 32, no. 6 (published Dec 1988), pp. 417–598, doi:10.1111/j.1399-3011.1988.tb01371.x, PMID 3073145
- Hruby, V J (1988), "In memoriam Choh Hao Li, April 21, 1913-November 28, 1987", Int. J. Pept. Protein Res, vol. 31, no. 3 (published Mar 1988), pp. 253–4, PMID 3286549
- "Classic pages in Obstetrics and Gynecology. Interstitial cell stimulating hormone. II. Method of preparation and some physico-chemical studies, by Choh Hao Li, Miriam E. Simpson, and Herbert M. Evans. Endocrinology, vol. 27, pp. 803–808, 1940", Am. J. Obstet. Gynecol, vol. 17, no. 5 (published Nov 1, 1973), p. 716, 1973, PMID 4599575
- "Choh Hao Li", Triangle; the Sandoz Journal of Medical Science, vol. 9, no. 1, pp. 41–2, 1969, ISSN 0041-2597, PMID 4896971
- Ingle, D J; Nezamis, J E; Moreley, E H; Li, C H (1953), "The effect of some partially purified preparations of corticotrophin upon the work performance of adrenalectomized-hypophysectomized rats", Acta Endocrinol, vol. 14, no. 2 (published Oct 1953), pp. 93–8, doi:10.1530/acta.0.0140093, PMID 13113828
