= Xueheng School =

School of thought in 1920s and 1930s China

The Xueheng School (simplified Chinese: 学衡派; traditional Chinese: 學衡派; pinyin: Xuéhéngpài), also known as the Hsueh-Heng School or the Critical Review group, was a major school of thought against the New Culture Movement in China. Active in the 1920s and 1930s, the school founded and published the academic journal of The Critical Review, also known by Xueheng in Chinese, and was named after the journal. The school was impacted by the New Humanism of Irving Babbitt, amid the crisis of modernity debates after the First World War. Thus, the school went against full westernization of China, but rather promote careful, selective absorption of western culture.

== History ==
The Shandong Problem after the First World War irritated the general public in China, leading to the May Fourth Movement and promoting the New Culture Movement. While Chen Duxiu and Hu Shih severely criticized and denied the Chinese culture and blamed it as the root cause of China's falling behind in modernization in the journal La Jeunesse, their ideas were not accepted by many Chinese students who were then studying in the United States. Irving Babbitt, who taught at Harvard University from 1912 to 1933, due to his respect to Oriental cultures and values, was well-regarded among the Chinese students. According to Wu Mi, Babbitt's Chinese students at Harvard included Mei Guangdi, Wu Mi, Tang Yongtong, Zhang Xinhai, Lou Guanglai, Lin Yutang, Liang Shiqiu and Guo Binhe.

Invited by Mei Guangdi, Wu Mi returned from the United States and began teaching comparative literature at National Southeastern University in Nanjing, China in the fall of 1921. With further support from Liu Boming, Wu and Mei founded the Department of Western Literature at Southeastern and invited their like-minded colleagues at Harvard to teach at Southeastern. Together, they founded and published the journal of The Critical Review in 1922, which headquartered at Wu Mi's residence in Nanjing where these group of scholars met regularly and was published by Chung-hua Shu-chü. Any who published in the journal were considered a member of the group, which initially were mostly students and faculty at Southeastern. Mei Guangdi, Wu Mi, Hu Xiansu, Liu Boming and Liu Yizheng were top authors in the journal.

However, with the death of Liu Boming in November 1923, the Department of Western Literature was closed by the university in April 1924, leading to separation of the group. Mei Guangdi came to teach at Harvard while Hu Xiansu also came there to do a PhD in botany. Wu Mi went to teach at Northeastern University, followed by Miao Fenglin and Jing Changji. As only a few members wrote for the journal, the journal gradually became totally controlled by Wu Mi. Since Wu Mi began to teach at Tsinghua University in 1925, the faculty of Tsinghua Academy of Chinese Learning, including Wang Guowei, Chen Yinke and Liang Qichao also join the group.

In 1932, the group members became unsatisfied with Wu's monopoly over the journal and demanded the journal to be published by Zhongshan Publishing House, which was newly founded by Zhang Qiyun in Nanjing, which led to Wu's resignation. Miao Fenglin was appointed as the new editor-in-chief. In 1933, Liu Yizheng, Zhang Qiyun and Miao Fenglin at Southeastern decided to abandon The Critical Review and founded a new journal named Guofeng. Journal of Historical geography run by Liu Yizheng and his students at Southeastern, and Thoughts and Times founded by Zhang Qiyun at Zhejiang University were also considered to be associated with the group.
