= Doubting Antiquity School =

Group of scholars and writers in Chinese academia

The Doubting Antiquity School or Yigupai (Chinese: 疑古派; pinyin: Yígǔpài; Wade–Giles: I-ku-p'ai) refers to a group of scholars and writers in Chinese academia, starting during the New Culture Movement (mid-1910s to 1920s), who applied a critical historiographical approach to Chinese historical sources. They put forward theories doubting the authenticity of texts and narratives that, in traditional Chinese historiography, were often accepted as authentic.

Hu Shih studied in the West and was deeply influenced by Western thought. He then argued in Peking University that Chinese written history was not credible before the Eastern Zhou period without critical examination. This view was accepted by his students Fu Sinian and especially Gu Jiegang, who further advanced the position that "our traditional knowledge of Chinese antiquity was built up in successive strata, but in an order exactly the reverse of the actual occurrence."

Most of their criticism concerns the authenticity of pre-Qin texts and deals with questions put forward by the past dynastic writers, as well as other subjects. Hu Shih initiated the critical movement, with his pupil Gu Jiegang and his friend Qian Xuantong continuing this school of thought. Their writings also had influence on many western sinologists, including Bernhard Karlgren and Samuel Griffith.

In a more specific way, the Doubting Antiquity School was represented by Gushibian 古史辨 (Debates on Ancient History), the scholarly movement led by Gu Jiegang, centered on the magazine of the same name. Seven issues of the magazine, 1926–1941, contain about 350 essays.

Major critics of the Doubting Antiquity School were historians associated with the Critical Review, a journal founded in 1922. The historians included Liu Yizheng, Liang Qichao, Wang Guowei, Chen Yinque, and Miao Fenglin.

== Evaluation ==
In the atmosphere of critical re-evaluation of traditional culture and learnings of the early 20th century, the Doubting Antiquity School found great influence. Some of their conjectures cast doubt on the authenticity of historical narratives about Chinese antiquity as presented in traditional texts that had been accepted as authentic for millennia. It is these conjectures that gained the greatest popular interest in the non-academic media, such as:

- Yu the Great was originally an animal or deity figure used as a motif on bronzeware, and the veneration of bronzeware led to Yu being recast as a historical but super-human figure from antiquity;
- the peaceful transition of power from Yao to Shun was concocted by philosophers of the Zhou dynasty to support their political philosophy;
- a series of kings in early antiquity were concocted during the Han dynasty and the Xin dynasty to justify the rule of those dynasties on geomancy grounds; and
- a portion of the recorded history of the Xia dynasty was concocted, borrowing the narrative from real events in the Shang dynasty, to give historical precedent to the "revival" of the Eastern Han dynasty.

Nevertheless, the Doubting Antiquity School's more important legacy was the critical approach to sources they pioneered. The central tenet of their approach was that the history of Chinese antiquity was created iteratively. Ancient texts have been repeatedly edited, reorganised, tampered with or even completely fabricated, so the historical narrative of antiquity as presented in traditional texts was different at different points in time. As time went on, the history of antiquity became longer and more complicated and characters acquired more features, including more supernatural attributes. This means that it is not always possible to identify the "authentic" version of events from antiquity, only the narrative as stated in a text at a particular time.

Some of the conjectures put forward by the Doubting Antiquity School are now disproved or supported based on archaeological findings undermining or supporting the authenticity of the historical texts that the Doubting Antiquity School posited as inauthentic. Joseph Needham wrote in 1954 that many scholars doubted that classic texts such as Sima Qian's Records of the Grand Historian contained accurate information about such distant history, including the thirty kings of the Shang dynasty (c. 1600–c. 1046 BC) listed by Sima. Many scholars argued that Sima could not have had access to written materials which detailed history a millennium before his time. However, the discovery of oracle bones at an excavation of the Shang capital at Anyang (Yinxu) matched 23 names of the 30 Shang kings listed by Sima. Needham writes that this remarkable archaeological find proves that Sima Qian "did have fairly reliable materials at his disposal—a fact which underlines once more the deep historical-mindedness of the Chinese."

In 1993, scholar Li Xueqin made an influential speech in which he called for historians to "leave the 'Doubting Antiquity' period", which became the manifesto of the "Believing Antiquity" movement (although Li himself favoured a third historiographical approach of "Interpreting Antiquity"). Scholars of the "Believing Antiquity" viewpoint argue that archaeological discoveries of recent decades have generally substantiated Chinese traditional accounts rather than contradicted them, rendering the doubts of the Doubting Antiquity School largely obsolete. For instance, manuscripts discovered in tombs have proved the authenticity of several texts long thought to be later forgeries, including the Wenzi, the Kongzi Jiayu, the Heguanzi, parts of the Yi Zhou Shu, and many others.

== Criticism ==
The Doubting Antiquity School's opinion and claims were not universally accepted by other schools in the 1920s. Major critics of the Doubting Antiquity School were historians from the Historiography and Geography School (史地學派) of the National Central University in Nanjing and the academics associated with the academic journal Critical Review, termed the Xueheng School. The major opposition included Chu Coching, Liu Yizheng, Liang Qichao, Wang Guowei, Chen Yinque, and Miao Fenglin.

These historians claimed that the many hypotheses of the Doubting Antiquity School were radical nationalist revisionism influenced by the May Fourth Movement and New Culture Movement, which aimed to abolish Chinese tradition, as well as that some claims of the Doubting Antiquity School, such as Sino-Babylonianism, were based on assumptions without any archaeological evidence. Chinese writer Lu Xun dismissed the Doubting Antiquity School and their publication Gushibian (古史辨, Debates on Ancient History). He argued that the real intention behind the Doubting Antiquity School was to aggressively demolish the Chinese imperial legacy, so much so that they would reject real historiography. Much archaeological evidence discovered in the 20th century, such as Yinxu and Taosi, proved some of the Doubting Antiquity School's claims to be incorrect.

Zhang Guoan of Beijing Normal University believes the existence of the Doubting Antiquity School was a reflection of the political climate of rising Chinese nationalism at the time.

== Relationship with Chinese archaeology ==
The influence of the Doubting Antiquity School caused many people to lose confidence in many ancient books and traditional ancient histories. Driven by the special interest of Chinese people in history, they turned to Chinese archaeology, which was just beginning to yield information, in order to gain a better understanding of Chinese ancient history. The excavation of the ancient site of Yangshao Village in 1921 and the excavation of the ancient site of Xiyin Village in 1926 made people seek its relationship with the early history of China. Some also use fashionable sociological and historical theories to explain the origin of ancient Chinese history and ancient history and culture. Some Western and Japanese scholars also use archaeology in the service of their political intentions and racial prejudice.

At this time, the culture of the West was very glamorous, and its influence was widespread. The excavation of Yin Ruins in Anyang in 1928 brought the understanding and discussion of ancient history into a new stage. The Yin Ruins have oracle bone inscriptions and their important content to confirm the lineage of the Shang Dynasty's ancestors and kings recorded in "Records of the Grand Historian Yin Benji", as well as exquisite bronze wares. In 1929, the sixth excavation of the Yin Ruins in Anyang discovered a piece of painted pottery, which further aroused the thinking and discussion of the relationship between Yangshao and Xiaotun.

== List of early modern scholars ==
=== Prominent figures ===
- Hu Shih
- Gu Jiegang
- Qian Xuantong
- Guo Moruo
- Kang Youwei
- Liang Qichao

=== Others ===
- Chen Lisan (陈立三)
- Chen Wenbo (陈文波)
- Chen Zhu (陈柱)
- Cui Shi
- Deng Sishan (邓思善)
- Du Guoxiang
- Fan Wenlan
- Feng Youlan
- Feng Zhen (冯振)
- Gao Heng
- Gu Shi (顾实)
- Huang Yunmei (黄云眉)
- Jin Dejian (金德建)
- Li Jingchi (李镜池)
- Liao Ping
- Liu Jie (刘节)
- Liu Rulin (刘汝霖)
- Liu Xianxin (刘咸炘)
- Lü Simian
- Luo Genze
- Ma Xulun
- Qian Daxin (钱大昕)
- Qian Jibo
- Ren Jiyu (任继愈)
- Rong Zhaozu (容肇祖)
- Sun Cidan (孙次丹)
- Tao Fangqi (陶方琦)
- Tang Lan
- Wang Zhengyi (王正已)
- Wei Juxian (卫聚贤)
- Wu Qichang
- Xu Renfu (徐仁甫)
- Yang Bojun
- Yang Kuan
- Yang Rongguo
- Yang Yunru (杨筠如)
- Ye Guoqing (叶国庆)
- Yin Tongyang
- Yu Yongliang (余永梁)
- Zhang Jitong (张季同)
- Zhang Qihuang
- Zhang Shoulin (张寿林)
- Zhang Xincheng (张心澂)
- Zhang Xitang (张西堂)
- Zhao Shouzheng (赵守正)
- Zhu Xizu

== See also ==
- Old Texts
