= Chen Sanli =

Chinese poet

- 陳三立
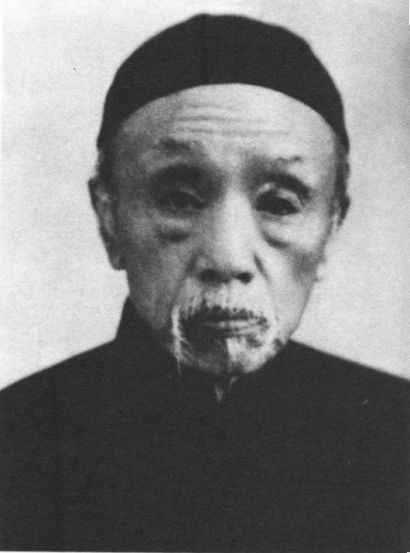
- Born: 23 October 1853; Xiushui, Jiujiang, Qing Dynasty
- Died: 14 September 1937; Beiping, Republic of China
- Occupation: Poet
- Parent: Chen Baozhen
- Relatives: Chen Yinke (son); Chen Shizeng (son)

Chen Sanli (23 October 1853 – 14 September 1937) aka Boyan, Sanyuan Laoren, was a Chinese poet who wrote in the classical style in the early modern era. He was born in Xiushui, Jiujiang [Kowallis, p. 169]. His father was Chen Baozhen, Qing dynasty governor of Hunan. Along with Zheng Xiaoxu and Shen Zengzhi, he became one of the leading figures of the Tongguang school, which was related to but not identical with the Song poetry style [Kowallis, pp. 168–208]. From 1889 Chen Sanli served as a civil servant, and with his father Chen Baozhen (1831–1900), the governor-general of Hunan and an associate of Tan Sitong and Kang Youwei, he led local reform in Hunan, which became a model in the minds of reformists for the entire country. After the Empress Dowager suppressed the Hundred Days Reform of 1898, the Chens were forced to leave the government and go into internal exile near Jiujiang. His father died shortly thereafter, which greatly saddened the son. He then moved to a villa he built outside Jinling (Nanjing) called Sanyuan Jingshe (The Sanyuan Retreat), from which Chen Sanli derived his pen-name. After the 1911 Xinhai Revolution, Chen Sanli declined to serve in government under the Republic, but he was not a Qing yilao [loyalist] in the classic sense. After the Marco Polo Bridge Incident, he is said to have committed suicide by starvation in protest at the Japanese invasion.

Chen Yan, the main theorist of the poetics of the Tongguang school, characterized Chen Sanli's poetry as "obscure and profound" (生涩奥衍). Chen Sanli was said to have learned from the Northern Song poet Huang Tingjian, but he did not imitate, he developed this style [Kowallis, p. 194]. Many of Chen's poems reflect the chaos and suffering of the Chinese people during the early 20th century.

Chen Shizeng, One of Chen Sanli's sons became a famous painter. Another, the historian Chen Yinke, was an eminent authority on Buddhism and the institutional history of Tang-era China [Lo and Schultz, p. 351].
