= The Critical Review (Chinese journal) =

学衡 (Chinese) The Critical Review (English)
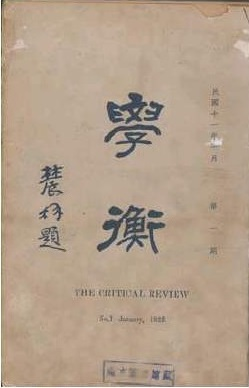
- The first edition of the journal published in 1923
- Editor: Wu Mi
- Frequency: Monthly (1922-1926); Bimonthly (1922-1933)
- Publisher: The Critical Review Group
- First issue: 1922
- Final issue: 1933
- Country: China
- Language: Chinese, English

The Critical Review, also known as Xueheng in Chinese, was a major Chinese-language journal that supports traditional Chinese culture during the New Culture Movement. Generally regarded as cultural conservatism, the scholars who published on the journal, including Wu Mi, Mei Guangdi, Hu Xiansu, Liu Yizheng and Guo Binhe, were termed the Critical Review Group or the Xueheng School, based at National Southeastern University.

== History ==
In the late 1910s, the debates about Chinese culture and language divided the Chinese students in the United States. Among the students, Hu Xiansu and Mei Guangdi proposed to publish a journal, which was echoed by Liu Boming and Ma Zonghuo, and later joined by Wu Mi and Liu Yimou. The Critical Review Group was thus founded in October 1921. The journal had no leader or editor-in-chief. Wu Mi was elected as the collector of the writings and Liu Mouyi was elected as the writer of the foreword section. The first issue was published in January 1922. The journal was a monthly and 60 issues were published before it was closed in the end of 1926. In 1928, the journal re-opened as a bimonthly, but was again closed in 1930. The journal reopened in 1931 and closed in July 1933.

== Content ==
According to the foreword of the journal, the purpose of this journal was "to study sciences and arts, to seek and elucidate truth, to build on the quintessence of the nation, to criticise from a neutral and just perspective, as a nonpartisan, but not as a radical or follower."

The Critical Review group, or the Xueheng School, was against the New Culture Movement because of its romanticism, its utilitarianism and its iconoclasm. The scholars of the group were mostly educated in the West. In their debates against full westernization of China, they echoed the ideas proposed by the national essence school, but integrated the ideas with western ones. As Wu Mi points out, " it was the introduction of Western ideas and the imitation of Western models that led this group of intellectuals to adopt a more appreciative attitude toward their own literary and cultural past."

The Critical Review, under the leadership of Wu Mi, introduced one of the earliest Chinese translation of Greek classics, including Plato's dialogues and Aristotle's ethics. Additionally, lots of new humanistic writings were also preferably selected into the journal by Wu Mi.

== Legacy ==
Xueheng School is an iconic school of thought in the history of Nanjing University, the successor of National Southeastern University. The school also impacts the academics of Zhejiang University after Chu Kochen, who taught at Nanjing, was appointed as the president of Zhejiang University. In memory of the journal, Nanjing University founded Xue-heng Institute for Advanced Studies in 2014 for the glocalization of interdisciplinary history studies at the university. Since 2016, the institute began to publish a journal named New Critical Review.
