= Chang Ch'i-yun =

Chinese historian, geographer, educator and politician (1901–1985)

- 張其昀
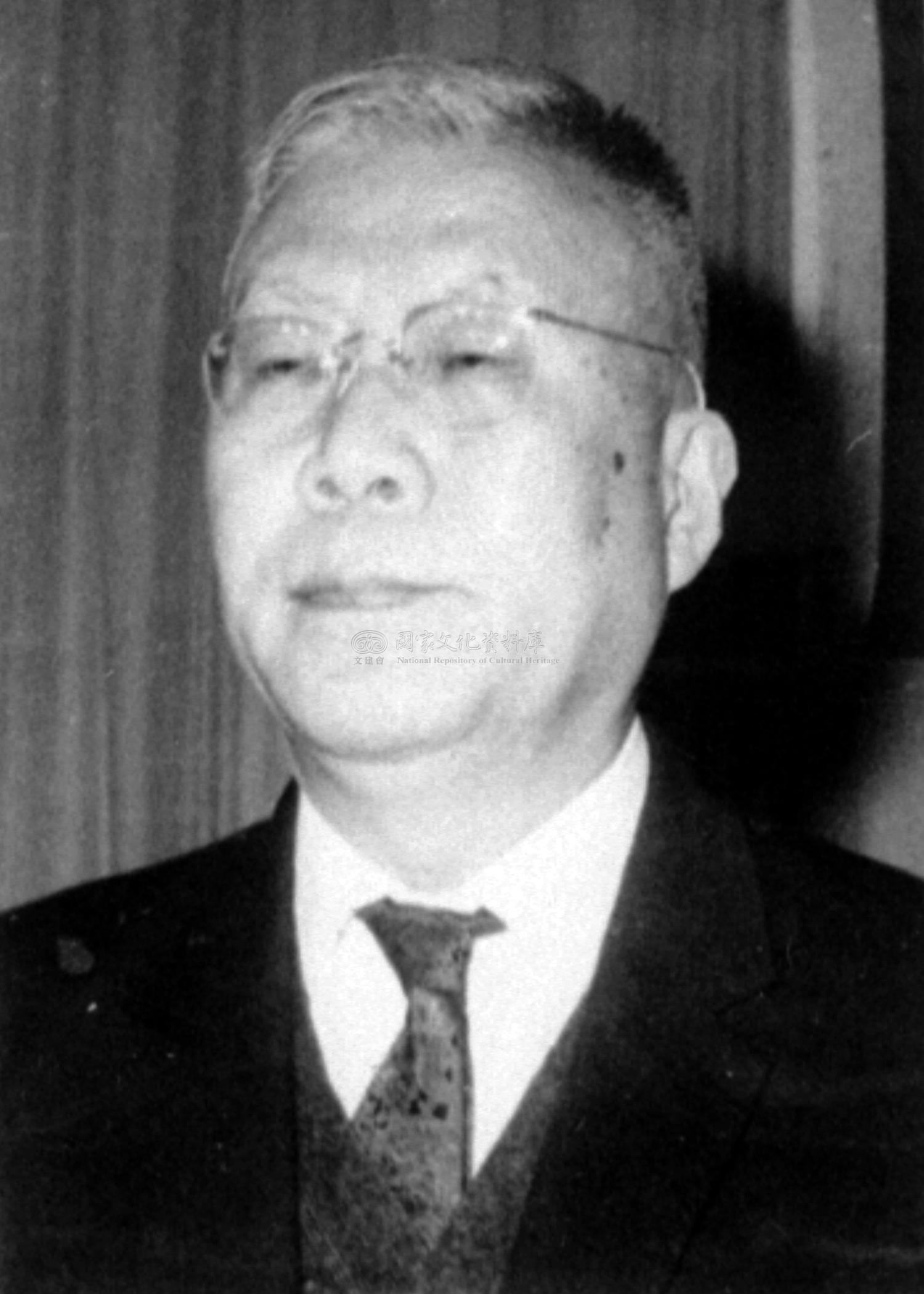

Minister of Atomic Energy Council of the Republic of China
- In office 2 June 1955 – July 1958
- Preceded by: Position established
- Succeeded by: Mei Yi-chi

Minister of Education of the Republic of China
- In office 27 May 1954 – 14 July 1958
- Preceded by: Cheng Tien-fong
- Succeeded by: Mei Yi-chi

Personal details
- Born: 29 September 1901 Yinzhou, Ningbo, Zhejiang
- Died: 26 August 1985 (aged 83) Taipei, Taiwan
- Party: Kuomintang
- Children: Chang Jen-hu
- Education: National Nanjing Higher Normal School

Chang Ch'i-yun
- Traditional Chinese: 張其昀
- Simplified Chinese: 张其昀
Transcriptions
Standard Mandarin
- Hanyu Pinyin: Zhāng Qíyún
- Wade–Giles: Chang Ch'i-yün

Chang Ch'i-yun (29 September 1901 – 26 August 1985) was a Chinese historian, geographer, educator and politician. He was the founder of the Chinese Culture University and the Nanhai Academy, and served as Minister of Education of the Republic of China from 1954 to 1958. He was a lead editor on the Zhongwen Da Cidian.

== Biography ==
Chang Ch'i-yun graduated from the Division of History and Geography of National Nanjing Higher Normal School (later renamed National Central University and Nanjing University), where he studied from scholars such as Liu Yizheng, Zhu Kezhen and Liu Boming.

After graduating, Chang worked for The Commercial Press as an editor, and later taught at his alma mater, the National Central University. In 1936, he was transferred to Zhejiang University and taught history and geography, later becoming the university's dean of the Faculty of Arts. In 1943, Chang was invited to give lectures at Harvard University in the U.S.

In 1949, Chang escaped to Taiwan, where he became the Secretary-General of the Kuomintang Central Committee, and in 1954, he became the Minister of Education. In 1955, Chang became the first Minister of the Atomic Energy Council, a position he held until 1958.

In 1962, Chang founded the Far East University, later renamed the Chinese Culture University.

Chang died in Taipei in 1985.

His son is Chang Jen-Hu, an educator in Taiwan.

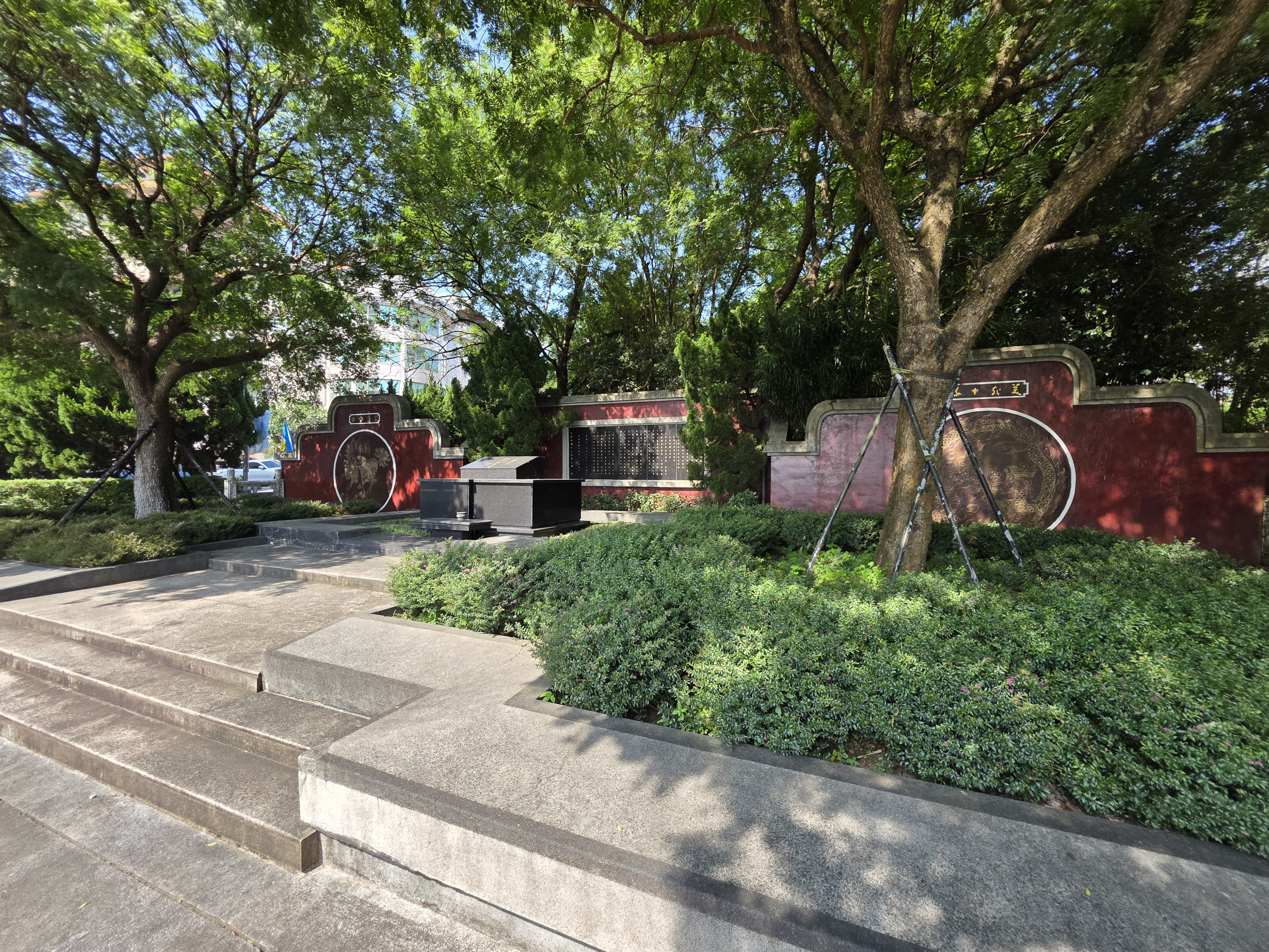
Chang Ch'i-yun's grave in Xiao Yuan Garden, Chinese Culture University.

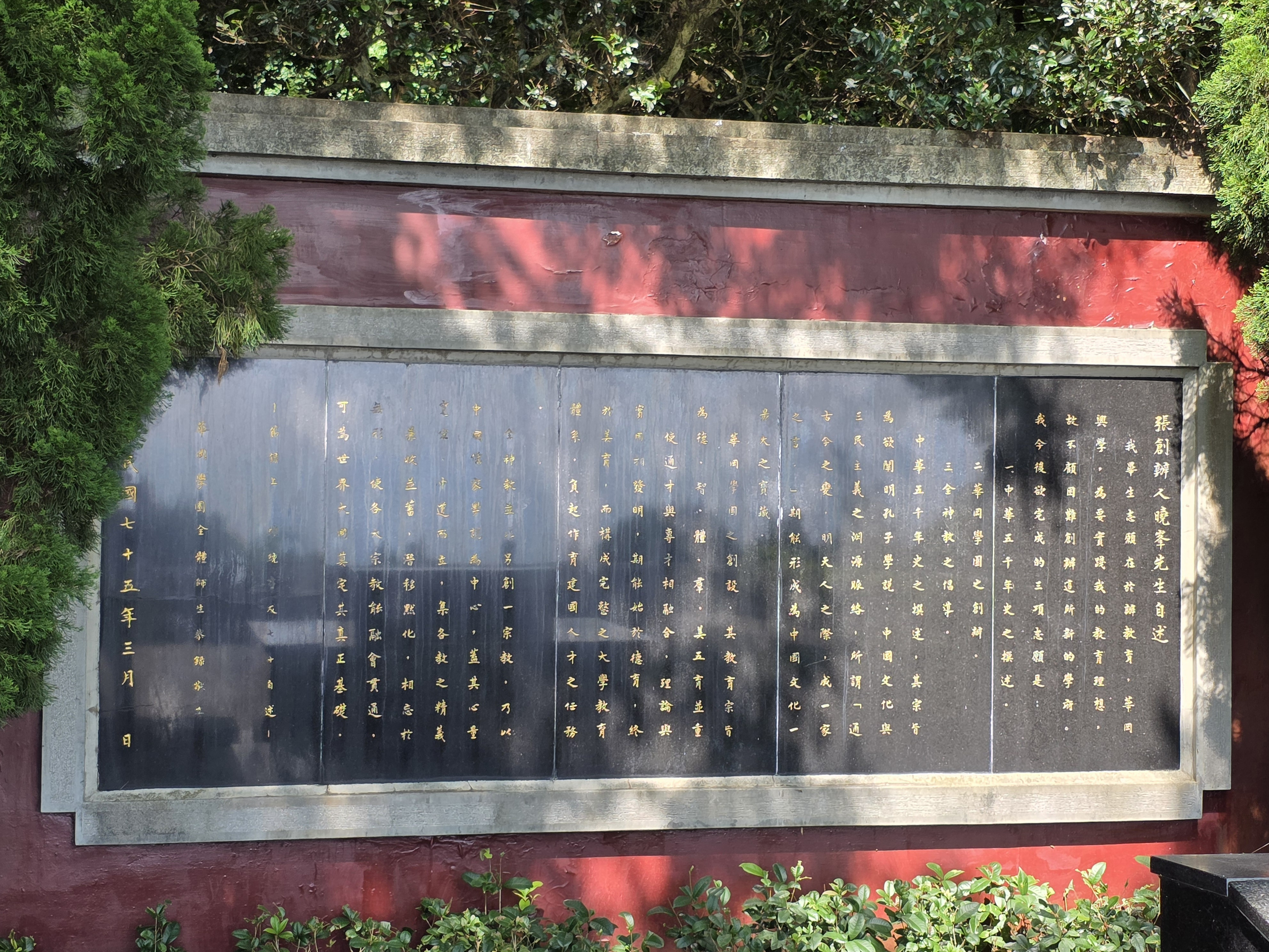
Epitaph of Chang Ch'i-yun in Xiao Yuan Garden, Chinese Culture University.

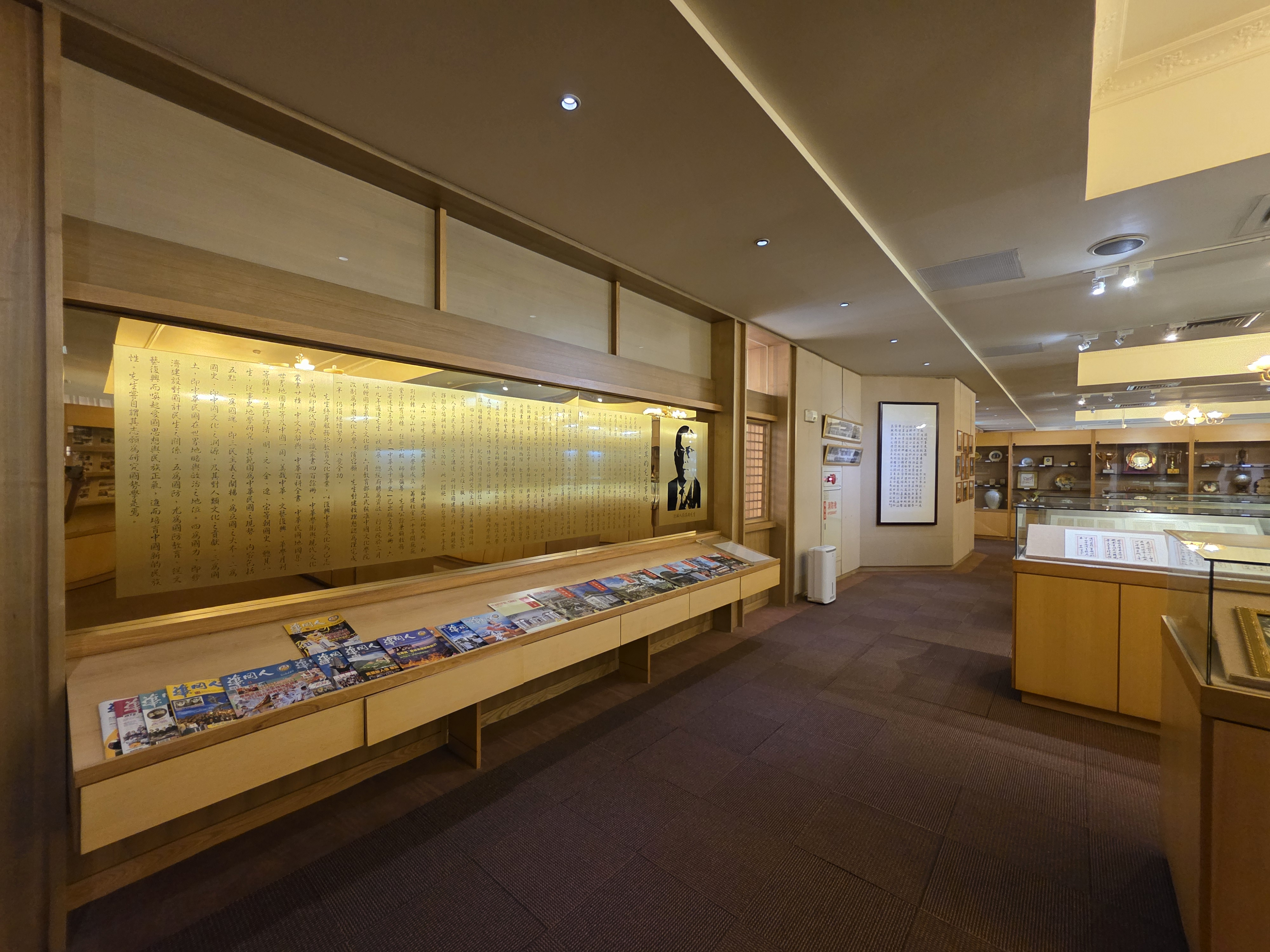
Xiao Feng Memorial Hall, the memorial museum of Chang Ch'i-yun in the Chinese Culture University.

== Works ==
- 《清史》 "Qing Shi" History of Qing, 1961.
