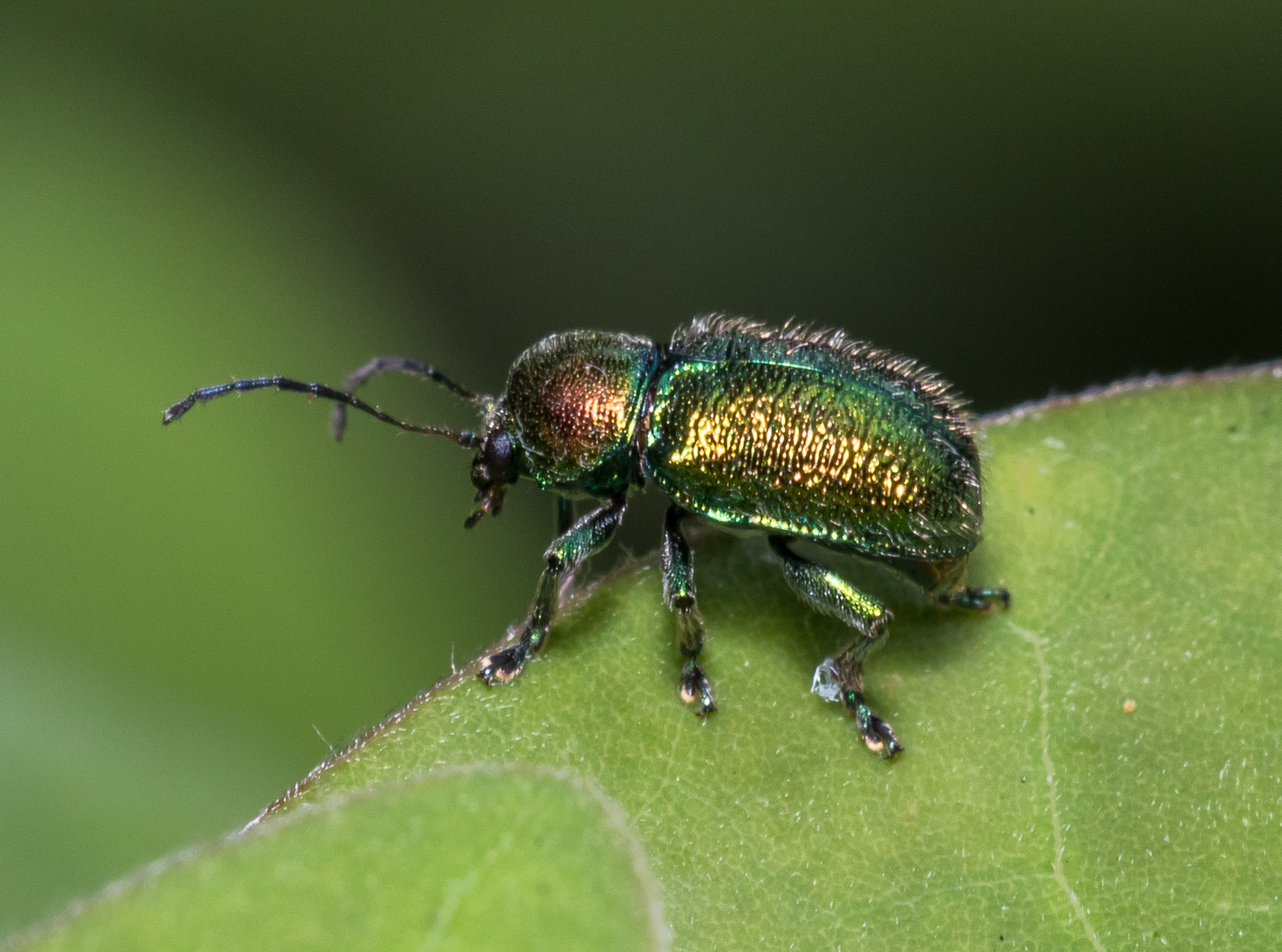

Scientific classification
- Kingdom: Animalia
- Phylum: Arthropoda
- Clade: Pancrustacea
- Class: Insecta
- Order: Coleoptera
- Suborder: Polyphaga
- Infraorder: Cucujiformia
- Family: Chrysomelidae
- Genus: Abirus
- Species: A. fortunei

Binomial name
- Abirus fortunei (Baly, 1861)

Synonyms
- Dermorhytis fortunei Baly, 1861; Abirus harmandi Lefèvre, 1876; Abirus denticollis Lefèvre, 1893; Abirus granosus Lefèvre, 1893; Abirus harmandi var. achardi Pic, 1923; Abirus atricolor Pic, 1927; Abirus atricolor var. superbus Pic, 1927; Abirus recticollis Pic, 1927; Abirus sinensis Pic, 1927; Abirus sinensis var. guerryi Pic, 1927; Abirus yashiroi Yuasa, 1930; Abirus kiotoensis Pic, 1944; Abirus latus Pic, 1944; Abirus latus var. semicyaneus Pic, 1944; Abirus malleti Pic, 1944; Abirus harmandi var. cuprescens Pic, 1946; Abirus harmandi var. curtus Pic, 1946; Abirus harmandi var. viridescens Pic, 1946; Abirus sinensis var. guerryi Pic, 1946

= Abirus fortunei =

Species of beetles

Abirus fortunei is a species of beetle in the leaf beetle family (Chrysomelidae), distributed in China, Taiwan, the Ryukyu Islands, North Korea, Myanmar, Thailand, Laos and Vietnam. The scientific name of the species was published as Dermorhytis fortunei in 1861 by Joseph Sugar Baly, who described it from specimens collected in northern China by Robert Fortune. A. fortunei is known as a major pest of mulberry in China.

== Description ==
A. fortunei has a length of 7.5–9.5 millimetres (0.30–0.37 in), and is subcylindrical in shape. The general color of the body is variable, being either metallic green, cupreous (reddish-brown), violet or purplish. The antennae are blackish brown in color, with the basal segments being fulvous (tawny or brownish-orange). The back side is covered with fine setae. Both the pronotum and elytra are also covered in large punctures, and the elytra also have a wrinkled texture with the wrinkles oriented transversely.

== Biology ==
In Xiushui County of Jiangxi Province, China, A. fortunei is recorded to have one generation every two years. Adults and larvae overwinter in soil chambers found 15–60 centimetres (5.9–23.6 in) underground in mulberry fields. Adults feed on the leaves, while larvae feed on the underground parts of the mulberry tree, generally 30–50 centimetres (12–20 in) under the soil surface. The eggs hatch in 9–10 days, the larval stage lasts 15–16 months, the pupa stage lasts 15–19 days, and the adult stage lasts 8–9 months (6–7 months of which are spent hibernating underground).
