= Liu Boming =

Liu Boming may refer to:

- Liu Boming (philosopher) (1887–1923), Chinese philosopher and educator
- Liu Boming (astronaut) (born 1966), Chinese pilot and astronaut
