= Wu Mi =

Chinese poet (1894–1978)

- Born: August 20, 1894; Jingyang, Shaanxi, China
- Died: January 17, 1978 (aged 83); Jingyang, Shaanxi, China
- Occupations: Founder of Chinese comparative literature, Critic, Redologist, Educator, Poet
- Writing career
- Pen name: Yu Sheng
- Period: 1894–1978

Wu Mi (Chinese: 吴宓) (August 20, 1894 – January 17, 1978) (once using the name Wu Yuheng (吴玉衡)) was one of the founders of Chinese comparative literature, a critic, redologist (one who studies the Chinese classic book Dream of the Red Chamber), educator and poet. In 1942 he became a professor in Ministry of Education (Republic of China). He was also one of the originators to begin Tsinghua University's school of Sinology. While studying at Harvard, he became known as "one of the three Outstanding Persons of Harvard" along with Chen Yinke and Tang Yongtong (汤用彤).

== Education ==
In 1903, Wu Mi went to an old-style private school, where his classmates ranged from ten to thirty years old, to begin studying Sinology systematically in Xi'an. He read Confucian classics such as Spring and Autumn Annals, Zuo Zhuan. He also read Xinmin Series Newspaper (新民丛报) Shanghai Vernacular Newspaper (上海白话报), the papers sent by his family from Shanghai. He also tried writing novels, but did not succeed.

Wu Mi went to Sanyuan County in order to learn from Wang Linbian (王麟编) in October 1904. In the same year, the imperial examination system was officially abolished.

In the beginning of 1906, he moved to Sanyuan County with his grandmother from Xi'an (西安). He took the preparatory course of Hongdao Advanced School (宏道高等学堂, like junior school today) studying Chinese, English, Maths etc. During the study, he began to write poems, novels and scripts. He tried to make a magazine called Magazine of Xi'an (西安杂志), but gave up very soon. At that time, he first read the novel Dream of the Red Chamber.

Wu changed his name to Wu Mi in May 1910. He took the entrance examination of Tsinghua Preparatory School for America (清华留美预备学校) and took first place in the regional examination of Xi’an. In 1911, he passed the reexamination as the second of 400 students from all over China. He cut his long braid when he arrived in Beijing. On 29 April, he began his study in Tsinghua School, but because of financial difficulties Tsinghua School (清华学堂) was suspended for a while. At that time, he went to Shanghai to do proofreading work for People Daily (民立日报).

In February 1912, Wu went to Shanghai to learn English at St. John's University. In May, he went back to Tsinghua School. He was elected the representative of a student strike in September and was expelled from the school, but soon the school restored his name on the school roll for his outstanding achievement in school.

Wu Mi graduated from Tsinghua Preparatory School in June 1916. Since he didn't pass the physical examination and had an eye disease, he was deferred from going to America for one year. He worked as a translator of Tsinghua School's copy-writing department. During his study in Tsinghua, he was the editor of Tsinghua Study Journal (清华学报), Tsinghua Weekly (清华周刊) and Tsinghua English Annual Report (清华英文年报). A lot of his articles were published in these newspapers and magazines.

Wu arrived at America in September 1917. He went to the University of Virginia to learn Literature. In June 1918 he finished the one-year study in University of Virginia and started studying in Harvard Summer School to learn French and Psychology. He later made friends with Mei Guangdi (梅光迪), who was sent to Harvard by Tsinghua in 1911. With Mei Guangdi's help, Wu enrolled in the School of Comparative literature in Harvard University where he studied with Professor Irving Babbitt.

Wu got a Bachelor of Arts degree from Harvard University in June 1920 and moved on to the graduate school of Harvard in September. In June 1921 he received the Master of Arts degree of Harvard. Then he went back to China.

== Career ==
In September 1921, Wu Mi was elected as professor in English and English literature department of National Southeastern University (Nanjing Higher Normal School, later renamed National Central University and Nanjing University). In October, he set up Xueheng Society (学衡社) and began to publish the journal Xueheng with scholars including Liu Yizheng, Mei Guangdi, Hu Xiansu and Liu Boming. Wu Mi made himself editor in chief.

In September 1922, the Department of Western Literature was found in Southeast University and Wu Mi became the professor of that department.

In April 1924, Western Literature Department of National Southeastern University in Nanjing was cut down. Wu Mi went to Northeast University in Fengtian (now Shenyang) as an English professor.

In February 1925, Wu Mi left Northeast University and went to Tsinghua University as chairman of Research Institute.

In March 1926, Wu Mi resigned the chairman of Research Institute and focused himself on the teaching.

In June 1927, Wu Mi accepted the post of chief editor of the literature section of Ta Kung Pao.

In 1929, Wu Mi attempted to establish the ideal school with Liang Shuming, but it didn't succeed.

In September 1930, Wu Mi went to Europe to visit and study. One year later, he came back to Tsinghua and continued his teaching. At Tsinghua, his famous students included Qian Zhongshu, who, while greatly admiring Wu, wrote a satirical essay about him, which caused a minor scandal. Qian's essay followed on a similar profile of Wu as being an estimable man but a deluded romanticist by Wu's colleague Wen Yuan-ning.

In 1937, the Second Sino-Japanese War broke out. The Apartment of Literature of National Southwestern Associated University which is made up of Tsinghua University, Peking University, Nankai University was set up in Hengshan. Wu Mi went to Hengshan to teach.

In January 1938, National Temporary University was renamed National Southwestern Associated University and moved to Kunming. Wu Mi also moved with the Department of Literature to be a professor in Kunming.

In 1941, at the age of 48, Wu continued teaching in National Southwestern Associated University At the end of the year, the Pacific War broke out and Hong Kong was seized by Japanese army. One year later, in 1942, Wu Mi became a professor of Western Literature in the Ministry of Education.

In 1944, Wu Mi got a one-year-long vacation approved by the Ministry of Education (Republic of China). During the vacation he gave lectures at several universities such as Yenching University and Sichuan University.

The vocation came to an end in 1945 and Wu made up his mind to become a professor of the English Department in Yenching University, so he refused the position of the English Department chairman. At the same time, he was the visiting professor of Chinese Department in Yenching University, as well as the chair professor of Sichuan University.

In 1946, Wu didn't go back to Tsinghua University though the university was restored in fall. In August, Wu went to Wuhan and joined Zhonghua University (now Central China Normal University) and held the post of English Department chairman. Meanwhile, he was the editor of the literary supplement of Wuhan Daily.

In April 1948, Wu Mi lectured in the Northwestern University in Xi’an. The same year in May, he went to Guangzhou in order to give lessons in both Zhongshan University and Lingnan University.

In 1950, Wu changed to be the professor of the English Department in Sichuan Education College (四川教育学院). In 1952, Sichuan Education College was incorporated and renamed as Southwest Normal College (西南师范学院), and then Wu became the professor of the college.

== Personal life ==
=== Marriage ===
Wu Mi is not only a poet and a writer, but also recognized as a devoted lover. In November 1918, When Wu Mi studied at Harvard, suddenly he received a letter from his classmate Chen Liexun, Chen wanted to introduce his sister Chen Xinyi (陈心一) to WuMi for his wife. In August 1921, As Wu Mi returned home, he hurried to Hang Zhou to see Chen Xinyi. They formally married each other after 13 days later. So Wu Mi's first marriage was hasty. But the marriage proved a tragedy later.

Wu Mi married Zou Lanfang (邹兰芳) in her twenties in 1953. Zou Lanfang's life is really very pitiful. She completed her study in Chongqing University with her brothers' aid financially who were working for the KMT. When her brothers died, she took up the heavy burden to raise her brothers' children. She had poor health and it made her life difficult to continue.

When she saw an article in Xinhua Daily written by Wu Mi, She began to write to Wu Mi of her own initiative, and show her great worship of him. Then she went to Wu Mi's home without invitation asking Wu questions and helping him to wash clothes as his student. At the end, Wu Mi married her and at that time, Wu Mi had a high salary and had a higher political status. But Wu was tormented that the love between teachers and students disgraced him, also, Zou Lanfang was taking medicine all the time. Wu Mi once mentioned to his friend that, it was helping her to raise her family of nine rather than just love.

Three years later, Zou Lanfang died of a lung disease. And Wu Mi continue to raise her nephews and nieces because of his honesty and kindness.

Another important woman in Wu Mi's life is Mao Yanwen (毛彦文). Mao Yanwen was Chenxinyi's good friend. One day, when visiting her close friend, she met Wu Mi by chance. Wu Mi had known Mao Yanwen for a long time, and admired her excellent talent. Because Mao Yanwen's fiancée was Wumi's classmate Zhu Junyi (朱君毅), so he buried this emotion in the bottom of his heart. But as soon as Mao Yanwen broke up with Zhu Junyi, Wumi told her his love, despite being a family man. Mao Yanwen rejected Wu Mi flatly. Wu Mi also didn't give up, he unexpectedly divorced with Chen Xinyi in order to pursue Mao Yanwen. Years later, Mao Yanwen was touched by Wu Mi's persistence. But at this time, Wu Mi hesitated whether to marry her or not, and still was keen on keeping an ambiguous relationship with other girls. At last, Mao Yanwen married another man. Wu Mi also lost his favourite woman in his life. He was sad and filled with regret.

=== Father ===
He studied in Tsinghua university in 1911 where his thought had an embryonic form and become vague. He realized that the more one desires money, the less one has moral character. It is this idea that made the conflict between him and his father. The conflict showed up in the money, utility, position, and knowledge. He even stated clearly that although he would be an unworthy son, he wanted to be a useful man.

And in his real life later, Wu Mi could not run away from the duty and responsibility in waiting on and supporting his father. It was not only an ordinary affair but also Chinese traditional morality which he did not dare to disobey.

== Anecdotes ==
Wu Mi and the dog

When teaching in National Southwest Associated University, one time, Wu was in the class of comparison of Western poetry and China poetry, a dog belonging to a student waiting outside came into the classroom secretly and squatted in the corner listening, while Wu was writing on the blackboard. He was surprised that a dog was listening to his class after he finished writing. Wu quickly walked down from the rostrum, and said to the dog "At present, I am not qualified to make stones understand things. now is not the time you should come here, you’d better get out of here." The dog seemed to know what Wu meant, and bowed its tail immediately, going out quietly, and looking back to its master learning in the classroom.

Give five Yuan back to me

Once, a teacher from the Department of Chinese borrowed five yuan from Wu, and promised to give it back in a week. But, a week went past, and the teacher did not give back the money. So Wu went to the teacher's home, and asked him to pay back the five Yuan. Obviously, the teacher was so angry that he spread rumors that Wu Mi was very mean. Wu acknowledged it, and explained, "I was not for the five yuan. I did it to help him to improve his moral cultivation. Let's see two more small stories. 1 Wu Mi has a habit, that he must go to the post office to send money on the day he got his wages. The, payee ranged from his relatives to his students. He even borrowed money from neighbors to send to them. A poor student of his was admitted to a school of the USA to study. His family did not got so much money and Wu Mi gave him 300 Dollars to fulfill his wish. Wu Mi repeatedly stated that the money was non-repayable. 2 In the "Cultural Revolution", Wu Mi lived a lonely and bad life, and a woman teacher of Southwest Normal College felt pity for him and wove him a pair of wool socks. And Wu Mi gave the woman teacher 100 Yuan. 100 Yuan, was a large sum of money and could have bought thousands of pairs of socks. Many people thought it was too much for the wool socks, but Wu Mi did not think so. He said "Is it too much? No, no. It includes not only the cost of materials and labor, but also priceless feelings."

== Works ==
=== Newspaper and magazine ===
- The Critical Review (学衡)
- Xiang Jun (湘君)
- Literature Page of Ta Kung Pao (大公报 文学副刊)
- Literature page of the Wuhan Daily (武汉日报 文学周刊)

=== Other works ===
- Self-edited Chronicle (吴宓自编年表)
- Literature and Life (文学与人生)
- Diaries of Wu Mi (吴宓日记)
- Poetry Anthology of Wu Mi (吴宓诗集)
- Xu Zhimo and Shelley (徐志摩与雪莱)
