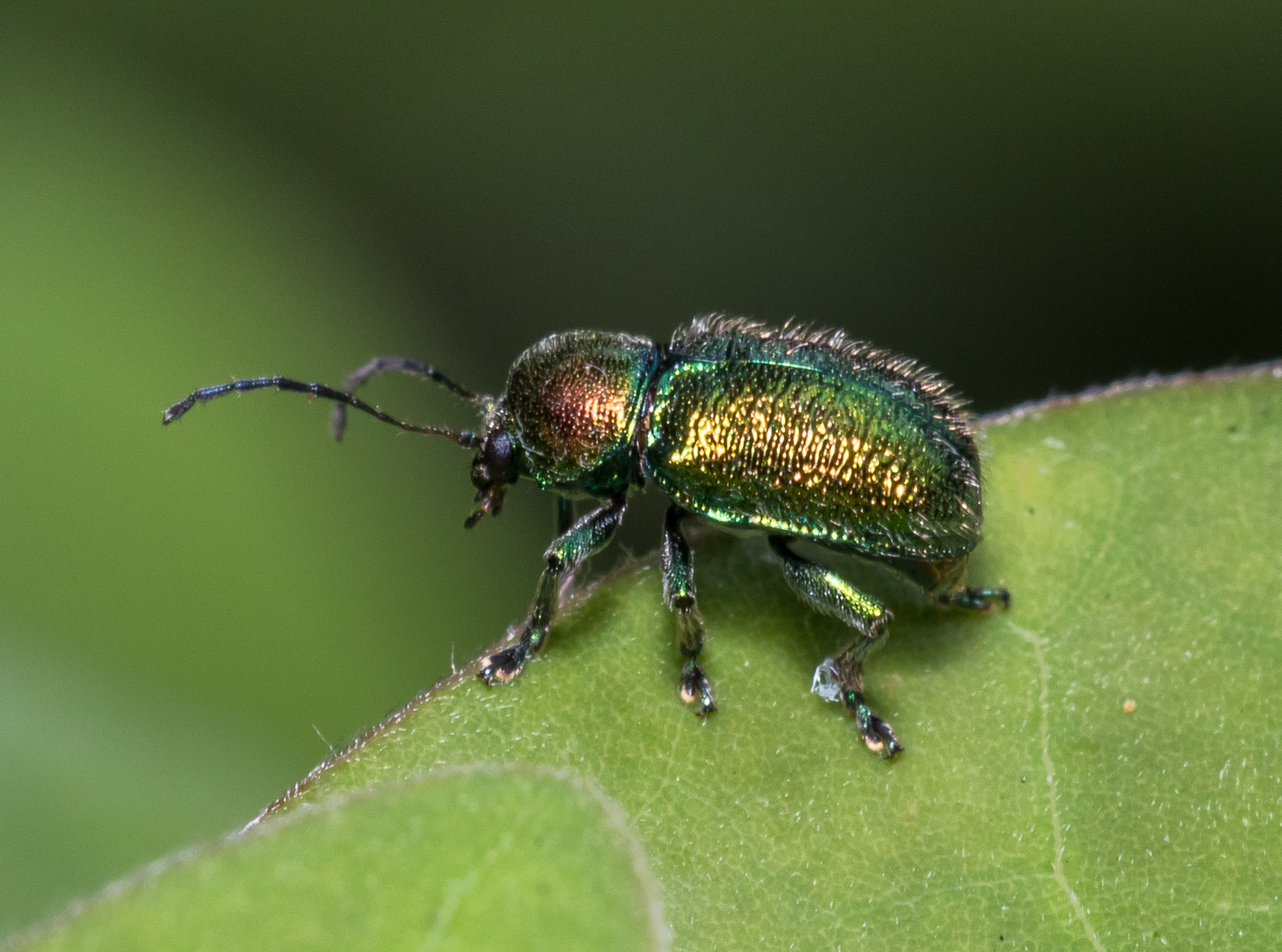
- Abirus fortunei

Scientific classification
- Kingdom: Animalia
- Phylum: Arthropoda
- Clade: Pancrustacea
- Class: Insecta
- Order: Coleoptera
- Suborder: Polyphaga
- Infraorder: Cucujiformia
- Family: Chrysomelidae
- Subfamily: Eumolpinae
- Tribe: Eumolpini
- Genus: Abirus; Chapuis, 1874

Type species
- Cryptocephalus aeneus Wiedemann, 1821

= Abirus =

Genus of leaf beetles from Asia

Abirus is a genus of leaf beetles in the subfamily Eumolpinae. It is distributed from the Malay Archipelago to the Indian subcontinent, China, and the Ryukyu Islands. The genus was first established by the Belgian entomologist Félicien Chapuis in 1874, as a split of Dermorhytis.

Abirus fortunei is known as a major pest of mulberry in China.

== Species ==
The following species are placed in the genus:

- Abirus aeneus (Wiedemann, 1821) – Java
- Abirus andamansis Lefèvre, 1891 – Andaman Islands
- Abirus angustatus Lefèvre, 1887 – Southern India
- Abtrus attenuatus Pic, 1946 – Philippines
- Abirus apicalis (Baly, 1867) – Borneo
- Abirus balyi Medvedev, 2019 – Borneo
- Abirus ceylonicus Jacoby, 1908 – Sri Lanka
- Abirus coerulea (Jacoby, 1877) – Borneo
- Abirus elegans (Baly, 1864) – Peninsular Malaysia
- Abirus elongatus Jacoby, 1908 – West Bengal (Darjeeling)
- Abirus flavopilosus Jacoby, 1884 – Sumatra, Bali
- Abirus fortunei (Baly, 1861) China, Taiwan, Ryukyu Islands, North Korea, Myanmar, Thailand, Laos, Vietnam
- Abirus globicollis Lefèvre, 1890 – Bangka
- Abirus hageni Lefèvre, 1887 – Sumatra
- Abirus igneicollis Jacoby, 1908 – Myanmar
- Abirus laticornis Tan, 1982 – Southwest China (Yunnan)
- Abirus philippinensis (Baly, 1867) – Philippines
- Abirus piceipes (Baly, 1867) – Java
- Abirus puberulus Lefèvre, 1876 – Java
- Abirus rubripes Lefèvre, 1885 – Sri Lanka
- Abirus speciosus Jacoby, 1895 – New Guinea
- Abirus subrugosus Jacoby, 1884 – Sumatra
- Abirus tuberculipennis Lefèvre, 1885 – Philippines
- Abirus vaksovi Medvedev & Romantsov, 2014 – Borneo (Sabah)
- Abirus violaceus Jacoby, 1884 – Peninsular Malaysia, Sumatra
- Abirus xishuangensis Tan, 1982 – Southwest China (Yunnan)

Synonyms:

- Abirus denticollis Lefèvre, 1893: synonym of Abirus fortunei (Baly, 1861)
- Abirus granosus Lefèvre, 1893: synonym of Abirus fortunei (Baly, 1861)
- Abirus harmandi Lefèvre, 1876: synonym of Abirus fortunei (Baly, 1861)
- Abirus kiotoensis Pic, 1944: synonym of Abirus fortunei (Baly, 1861)
- Abirus yashiroi Yuasa, 1930: synonym of Abirus fortunei (Baly, 1861)
