= Chen Yinke =

Chinese historian, linguist, and politician (1890–1969)

- 陳寅恪
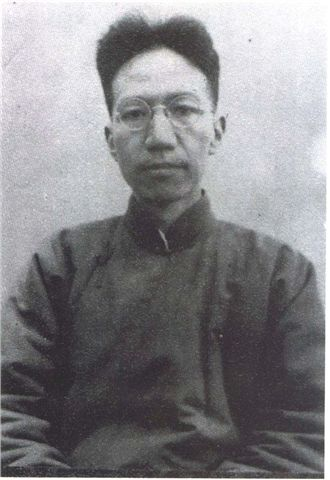
- Born: 3 July 1890; Changsha, Hunan, Qing Empire
- Died: 7 October 1969 (aged 79); Guangzhou, Guangdong, People's Republic of China
- Resting place: Lushan Botanical Garden, Jiujiang
- Education: Fudan University; Humboldt University of Berlin; University of Zurich; Institut d'Études Politiques de Paris; Harvard University
- Occupations: Historian, classical literature researcher, linguist, fellow of Academia Sinica
- Parent: Chen Sanli
- Relatives: Chen Baozhen (grandfather)

Chen Yinke
- Traditional Chinese: 陳寅恪
- Simplified Chinese: 陈寅恪
Transcriptions
Standard Mandarin
- Hanyu Pinyin: Chén Yínkè
- Wade–Giles: Ch'en^{2} Yin^{2}-k'e^{4}
- IPA: [ʈʂʰə̌n ǐnkʰɤ̂]
Hakka
- Romanization: Chin^{2} Yin^{2}-gok^{7}
Yue: Cantonese
- Yale Romanization: Chàhn Yàhn-kok
- Jyutping: Can^{4} Jan^{4}-kok^{3}

Chen Yinke, or Chen Yinque (3 July 1890 – 7 October 1969), was a Chinese historian. One of the most original and respected scholars in twentieth-century China, Chen was elected to the first cohort of Academia Sinica academicians in 1948 and as an inaugural academician of the Chinese Academy of Sciences in 1955. A polyglot with command of more than twenty languages, he was especially versed in classical scripts including Sanskrit, Old Turkic, and Tangut. His scholarship ranged broadly across literature, history, philosophy, and religious studies, distinguished by rigorous textual criticism. His notable works are Draft Essays on the Origins of Sui and Tang Institutions (隋唐制度淵源略論稿), Draft Outline of Tang Political History (唐代政治史述論稿), and An Alternative Biography of Liu Rushi (柳如是別傳).

== Biography ==
=== Early life ===
Chen Yinke was born in Changsha, Hunan in 1890, and his ancestral home was Yining, Jiangxi (now Xiushui County, Jiujiang). Yinke's father Chen Sanli was a famous poet, one of the "Four Gentlemen" of the Hundred Days' Reform. His grandfather was Chen Baozhen, the governor of Hunan between 1895 and 1898.

As a boy, Chen Yinke attended a private school in Nanjing, and was once a student of Wang Bohang, a sinologist. His family had a distinguished tradition in classical learning, so he was exposed from an early age to the Chinese classics, to history, and to philosophy. In 1902 he went to Japan with his elder brother Chen Hengke to study at the Kobun Gakuin (Kobun Institute) in Tokyo, where other Chinese students such as Lu Xun were also enrolled. In 1905 he was forced to return to China due to beriberi, and studied at Fudan Public School, Shanghai.

In 1910 he obtained a scholarship to study at Berlin University, and later at the University of Zurich and Institut d'Etudes Politiques de Paris. In 1914 he came back to China due to World War I.

In winter 1918 he got another official scholarship from Jiangxi to study abroad again. He studied Sanskrit and Pali at Harvard University under Charles Rockwell Lanman. At Harvard he first met Wu Mi, who was then studying literature under Irving Babbitt. They became lifelong friends.

In 1921, he went to Berlin University to study oriental languages under Heinrich Lüders, Central Asian languages under F. W. K. Müller, and Mongolian under Erich Haenisch. He acquired a knowledge of Mongolian, Tibetan, Manchu, Japanese, Sanskrit, Pali, English, French, German, Persian, Turkic, Tangut, Latin, and Greek. Particularly notable was his mastery of Sanskrit and Pali. Xia Zengyou once said to him: "It is good for you to be able to read books in foreign languages. I know only Chinese so I have no more to read after finishing all the Chinese books."

=== Tsinghua period ===
In March 1925, he returned to China again, meanwhile Wu Mi was in charge of the Institute of Guoxue Studies, Tsinghua School. He accepted the invitation to become a supervisor at Institute of Guoxue Studies, together with Wang Guowei, Liang Qichao and Zhao Yuanren. In 1928 Tsinghua School was restructured to become Tsinghua University. Chen was employed as professor at Chinese Language and Literature Department and History Department, while also adjunct with Peking University. Chen married Tang Yun (唐筼), granddaughter of Tang Jingsong, former governor of Republic of Formosa, in summer 1928. During this time he mainly gave lectures on Buddhist texts translation, historical documents of Jin dynasty, Northern and Southern dynasties, Sui dynasty, Tang dynasty, and Mongolia. He also became adjunct member of Board of Academia Sinica, research fellow and director of Department 1 of the Institute of History and Philology, board member of National Palace Museum, member of the Committee of Qing Dynasty's Documents. Among the many students at this time who went on to scholarly careers were Zhou Yiliang and Yang Lien-sheng.

After the Second Sino-Japanese War began, Chen moved to National Southwestern Associated University, Kunming, Yunnan, teaching lectures on history of Jin dynasty, Southern and Northern Dynasties, history of Sui dynasty and Tang dynasty, and poetry of Yuan Zhen and Bai Juyi.

=== During World War II ===
In 1939, Oxford University offered him a professorship in Chinese History. He left for Hong Kong in September 1940 on his way to United Kingdom, but was forced to return to Kunming due to ongoing battles. In 1941 he became a guest professor with Hong Kong University to teach history of Sui dynasty and Tang dynasty. Since the Japanese occupation in Hong Kong began in the end of 1941, he conducted history research at home, which resulted in the writing of A Brief Introduction to the Political History of Tang Dynasty. In July 1942, Chen fled to Guilin to teach in Guangxi University, later in December 1943 he moved to Chengdu to teach in Yenching University. He became employed by Tsinghua University for a second time in 1946.

Chen had a degenerative eye condition and lost his vision during the 1940s.

=== At Lingnan University ===
He began to teach at Lingnan University, Guangzhou in late 1948. As a result of a nationwide restructure campaign across universities and colleges, Lingnan University was merged into Zhongshan University in 1952. Chen Yinke taught courses on history of Jin dynasty and Southern and Northern Dynasties, history of Tang dynasty, and yuefu of Tang dynasty. One of Chen's major texts was An Extended Biographer of Liu Rushi, which recorded Liu's involvement in the anti-Manchu resistance movement.

In 1953, Chen declined an offer to lead Beijing's newly-established Institute of History.

He became vice president of Central Research Institute of Culture and History in July 1960.

In 1962, Chen was injured after falling down and disabled as a result. Around this time, his hearing also deteriorated and he developed a gastrointestinal ailment.

He finished this last major work in 1964.

=== During Cultural Revolution ===
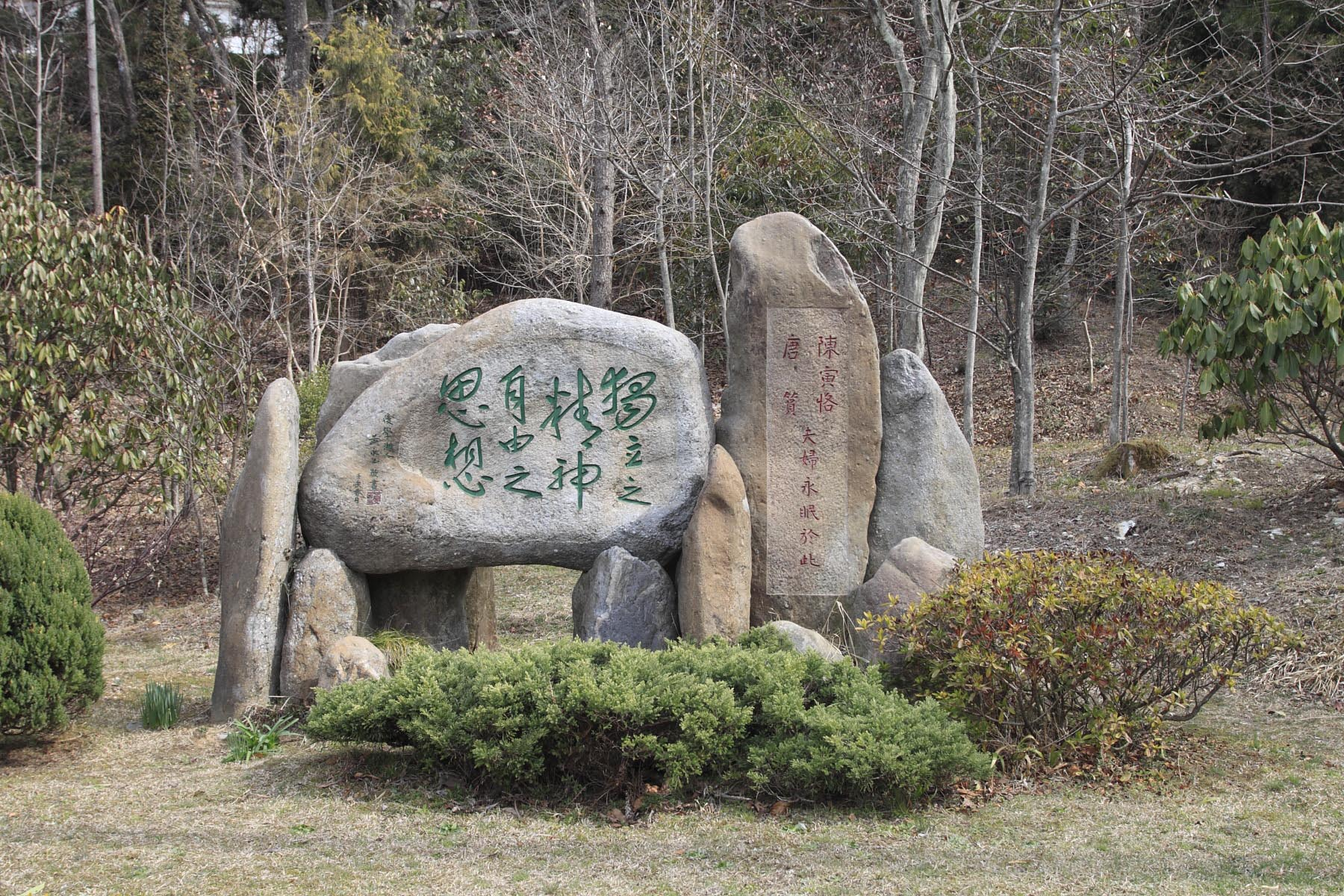
Tomb of Chen Yinke and his wife at Mount Lu

Chen was persecuted during the Cultural Revolution due to his previous connection with the out-of-favor Tao Zhu. He and his wife's salaries were frozen by the Red Guards. Several times he was forced to write statements to clarify his political standings: "I have never done anything harmful to Chinese people in my life. I have been a teacher for 40 years, only doing teaching and writing, but nothing practical (for Kuomintang)". Many of his book collections and manuscripts were stolen. Red Guards surrounded his home with loudspeakers, to force Chen, whom they viewed as a "reactionary academic" to listen to the revolutionary masses.

He died in Guangzhou on 7 October 1969 for heart failure and sudden bowel obstruction. 11 days later his obituary was published by the Southern Daily. The bone ashes of Chen and his wife was at first stored at Yinhe Revolutionary Cemetery, but moved to Lushan Botanical Garden in 2003. They are now buried near the "Three Founders Tomb" (Hu Xiansu, Ren-Chang Ching and Chen Fenghuai).

== Ideology ==
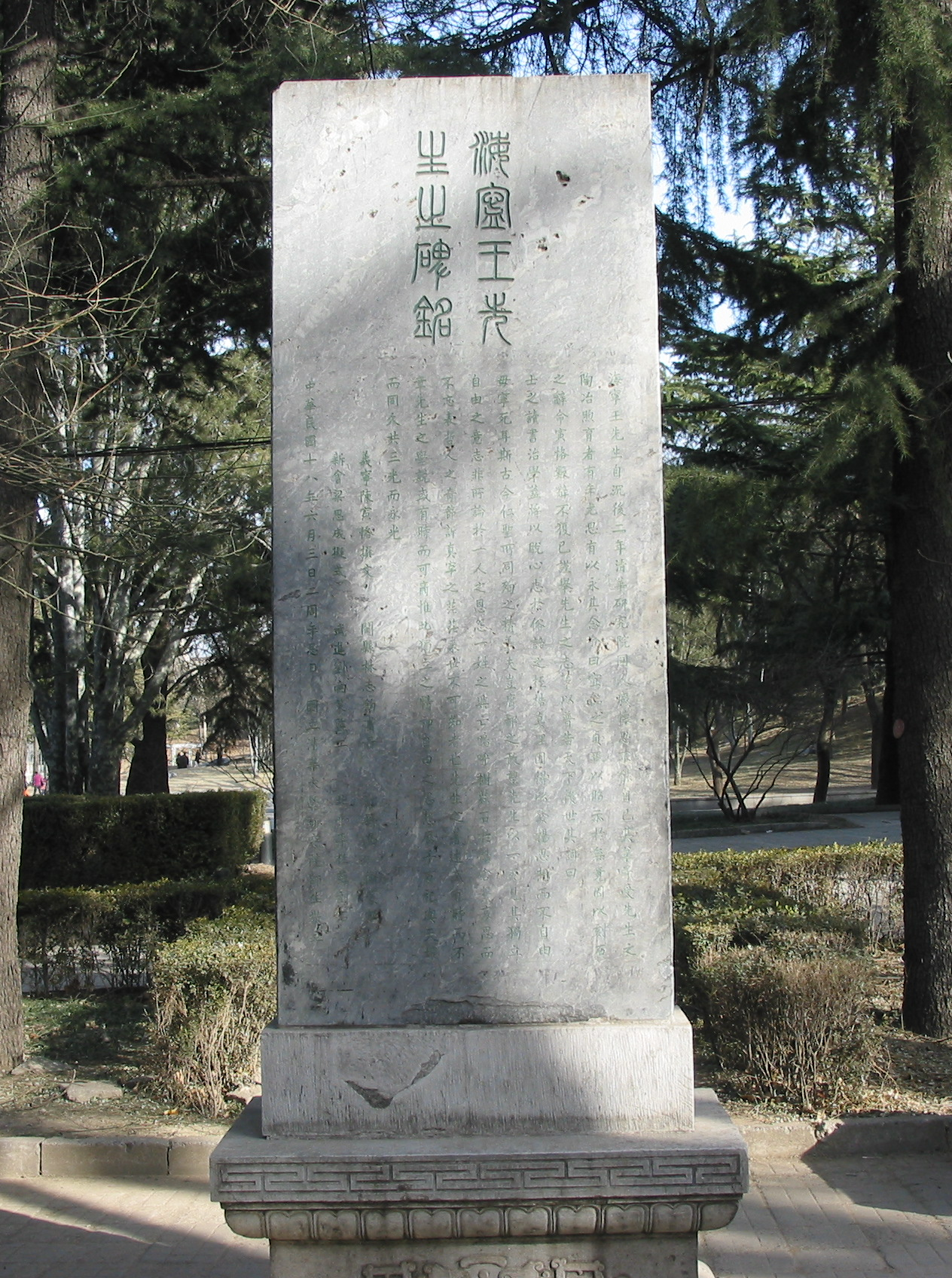
The Monument of Wang Guowei, text written by Chen Yinke including "thoughts of freedom, spirits of independence"

In 1952, Chen composed two poems, "The Female Impersonator" (男旦) and "Impromptu Verses on Watching the New Play of the Thirteenth Sister" (偶觀十三妹新劇戲作), in which he compared the Communist Thought Reform to theatrical cross-dressing, either transforming men into women or an old man into a young girl.

In 1953, Chen was invited to relocate from Guangzhou to Beijing to head the Second Institute of Historical Research (Institute of Medieval History) at the Chinese Academy of Sciences. In his "Reply to the Chinese Academy of Sciences" dated 1 December, he set out two conditions for accepting the post: that the institute be exempt from Marxist doctrine and compulsory political lectures, and that he be furnished with a written endorsement from either Mao Zedong or Liu Shaoqi as a guarantee. He explained that without consensus from the country's paramount political and party leaders, meaningful academic research would be impossible. Having effectively declined the position on these terms, Chen was instead invited by Guo Moruo to serve on the editorial board of Historical Research, the journal of the Institute of Historical Research (now Chinese Academy of History).

In the second half of 1954, the Chinese Academy of Sciences began electing its first cohort of academicians. Chen's nomination encountered resistance during deliberations, owing to his refusal to head the Second Institute of Historical Research and his public disavowal of Marxism. The matter was ultimately referred to Mao, who instructed that he be elected.

Chen opposed the simplification of Chinese characters. Before the PRC promulgated its simplification scheme in 1956, he attempted to convey his objections to Mao through Zhang Shizhao, who reported back that the matter was unnegotiable. Chen never wrote in simplified characters and left instructions that his works be published exclusively in traditional characters with vertical typesetting. Publishers in China honored this wish until October 2019, when his works entered the public domain fifty years after his death. In 2020, Yilin Press raised controversy by publishing the first simplified-character edition of Chen's works.

== Posthumous reception ==
Political and academic debate of Chen's legacy contributed to a surge of interest in Chen and his life in the Sinophone world beginning in the early 1980s and contributing to the 2000s. Public discussions, biographies, dramas, and documentaries characterized Chen as a "master of national learning" and intellectual of major significance.

In 1995, Lu Jiandong's book The Last Twenty Years of Chen Yinke prompted major debate about Chen in the Chinese public sphere. Similar melodramatic narratives of Chen were published in newspapers, magazines, and by the popular press. Chinese liberal intellectuals promoted these narratives. Critics contended that Lu's approach used hollow rhetoric to exaggerate Chen's psychological trauma and China's cultural despair.

Chen's legacy has significantly shaped the self-conception of Chinese liberal intellectuals.

In his essay The Unfreedom of Literati, academic Ge Zhaoguang describes Chen as having been conflicted between two approaches, that of the traditional Chinese "scholar-official" seeking to save the nation and the modern scholar who adheres to neutral academic norms. Writing approvingly, Zhu Xueqin contends that Chen's refusal to commit to any ideological doctrine makes him a perfect embodiment of classic liberalism.

== List of works ==
- 《寒柳堂集》
- 《金明館叢稿初編》(Writings on Jin Ming Guan, Vol. 1)
- 《金明館叢稿二編》(Writings on Jin Ming Guan, Vol. 2)
- 《陈寅恪魏晋南北朝史讲演录》、萬繩楠整理，黃山書社1987年版 (Chen Yinke Lectures on History of Wei, Jin, Southern and Northern Dynasties),
- 《隋唐制度淵源略論稿》(A Brief Introduction to the Origins of Institutions of Sui and Tang Dynasties)
- 《唐代政治史述論稿》(A Brief Introduction to the Political History of Tang Dynasty)
- 《元白詩箋證稿》(On Yuan Zhen and Bai Juyi's Poems), referring to the poets Yuan Zhen and Bai Juyi, famous in Chinese history
- 《柳如是別傳》(A Supplementary Biography of Liu Rushi)
- 《詩集 附唐篔詩存》
- 《書信集》
- 《讀書札記一集》
- 《讀書札記二集》
- 《讀書札記三集》
- 《講義及雜稿》
- 《陳寅恪史學論文選集》，上海古籍出版社1992年版，收文五十二篇。
- 《陳寅恪先生全集》，里仁書局1979年，收文九十四篇。(Chen Yinke Xiansheng Quanji, Chen Yinke's Entire Collection)
- 《论再生缘》Lun Zaishengyuan (On Reincarnation)
- 《陈寅恪学术文化随笔》Chen Yinke Xueshu Wenhua Suibi (Essays on Chen Yinke's Academy and Culture)
- 《陈寅恪文集》Chen Yinke Wenji (Collection of Chen Yin Ke)
- 《陈寅恪集》Chen Yinke Ji (Corpus of Chen Yin Ke)

== Further reading (Chinese) ==
- Chen Xiaocong 陈小从. 图说义宁陈氏. 山东画报出版社. 2004. ISBN 9787806037942.
- Wang Zhenbang 王震邦. 獨立與自由：陳寅恪論學. 聯經出版. 2011. ISBN 9789570838343.
- Zhang Qiuhui 张求会. 陈寅恪的家族史. 广东教育出版社. 2007. ISBN 9787540643768.
- 汪荣祖. 史家陈寅恪传. 北京大学出版社. 2005. ISBN 9787301077566.
- 蔣天樞. 陳寅恪先生編年事輯. 上海古籍出版社. 1997. ISBN 9787532521890.
- 陆键东. 陈寅恪的最后20年. 生活·读书·新知三联书店. 1995. ISBN 9787108008046.
- 张杰, 杨燕丽. 追忆陈寅恪. Social Sciences Literature Press. 1999. ISBN 9787801491589.
- 张杰, 杨燕丽. 解析陈寅恪. Social Sciences Literature Press. 1999. ISBN 9787801491596.
- 劉克敵. 陳寅恪和他的同時代人. 時英出版社. 2007. ISBN 9789867762832.
- 岳南. 陈寅恪与傅斯年. 陕西师范大学出版社. 2008. ISBN 9787561343326.
- 吴学昭. 吴宓与陈寅恪. 清华大学出版社. 1992. ISBN 9787302009740.
- 余英時. 陳寅恪晚年詩文釋證(二版). 東大圖書公司. 2011. ISBN 9789571930213.
- 纪念陈寅恪先生诞辰百年学术论文集. 北京大学出版社. 1989. ISBN 9787301008416.
- 罗志田. 陈寅恪的"不古不今之学". 近代史研究. 2008, (6).
- 項念東. 錢穆論陳寅恪：一場並未公開的學術論爭. 博覽群書. 2008, (3).
- 俞大維等. 談陳寅恪. 傳記文學.
- 李敖，《誰要來台灣？》，收在《笑傲五十年》
- 羅香林，《回憶陳寅恪師》
- Chen Zhesan 陳哲三：《陳寅恪軼事》
- 罗志田：〈陈寅恪学术表述臆解〉。
- 羅志田：〈從歷史記憶看陳寅恪與乾嘉考據的關係〉。
- 陸揚：〈陈寅恪的文史之学——从1932年清华大学国文入学试题谈起〉。
- 王晴佳：〈陈寅恪、傅斯年之关系及其他——以台湾中研院所见档案为中心〉。
- 陳建華：〈从"以诗证史"到"以史证诗"——读陈寅恪《柳如是别传》札记〉。
- 程美宝：〈陈寅恪与牛津大学〉。
- Chen Huaiyu 陈怀宇：〈陈寅恪《吾国学术之现状及清华之职责》疏证〉。
- 陈怀宇：〈陈寅恪留学哈佛史事钩沉及其相关问题〉。
- 陈怀宇：〈陈寅恪与赫尔德——以了解之同情为中心〉。
- 沈亞明：〈陳寅恪書信時序索引（初稿）〉。

== Portrait ==
- Chen Yinke. A Portrait by Kong Kai Ming at Portrait Gallery of Chinese Writers (Hong Kong Baptist University Library).
