= Chang Jen-hu =

Taiwanese scientist

- 張鏡湖
- Born: 18 March 1927; Ningbo, Zhejiang
- Died: 25 November 2019 (aged 92); Zhongzheng, Taipei, Taiwan
- Education: National Chekiang University (BA); Clark University (PhD)
- Father: Chang Ch'i-yun

Chang Jen-hu (Chinese: 張鏡湖; pinyin: Zhāng Jìnghú), or J. H. Chang (18 March 1927 – 25 November 2019) was a Chinese-born Taiwanese educator, geographer based in Taiwan. He was a specialist in ancient climate change, and the agricultural development of mainland China and Taiwan. Chang was the chairman of the board of directors of Chinese Culture University.

== Biography ==
Chang was born in Ningbo, Zhejiang Province, on 18 March 1927. His father was Chang Ch'i-yun, who was a prominent politician and educator of the Republic of China. Chang graduated from the Department of Geography and History of the National Chekiang University in Hangzhou in 1948. In 1954, Chang obtained his Ph.D. in geography from Clark University in the United States. Chang was a research associate at Johns Hopkins University from 1954 to 1956, at Harvard University from 1956 to 1958, and at the University of Wisconsin–Madison from 1958 to 1959.

From 1959 to 1964, Chang was an editor for the National Geographic Magazine of the National Geographic Society. From 1959 to 1984, Chang was a professor at the University of Hawaii, after which he was granted emeritus status. Chang is a past member of the editorial board of the Annuals of the Association of American Geographers. Chang was also the secretary of the Hawaiian Geophysical Society. From 1984, Chang chaired the board of directors of Chinese Cultural University. From 1987, he served in the same position at Taipei Hwa Kang Arts School.

Chang died on 25 November 2019 at National Taiwan University Hospital.

== Selected works ==
- Agricultural geography of Taiwan (1953). monographic volume.
- Climate and Agriculture; An Ecological Survey (1968). ISBN 978-0-202-36249-6.

== Honors and awards ==
Chang received several honorary doctorates, including from the Kyung Hee University in South Korea, Kokushikan University and Sōka University in Japan, and Saint Petersburg State University in Russia. Chang also received an honorary doctorate in humanities from his alma mater Clark University in 2006.
