= Cultural conservatism =

Conservative ideology advocating for the preservation of cultural traditions

Cultural conservatism is described as the protection of the cultural heritage of a nation state, or of a culture not defined by state boundaries. It is sometimes associated with criticism of multiculturalism, and anti-immigration sentiment. Because their cultural preservationist objectives are in conflict with those of anti-racists, cultural conservatives are often accused of racism. Despite this, however, cultural conservatism can be more nuanced in its approach to minority languages and cultures; it is sometimes focused upon heritage language learning or threatened language revitalization, such as of the distinctive local dialect of French in Quebec, Acadian French, Canadian Gaelic, and the Mi'kmaq language in Nova Scotia and New Brunswick, or the Irish language in Newfoundland. Other times cultural conservatism is more focused upon the preservation of an ethnic minority's endangered ancestral culture, such as those of Native Americans.

In the United States, cultural conservatism may imply a conservative position in the culture wars. Because cultural conservatism expresses the social dimension of conservatism according to the political compass theory, it is sometimes referred to as social conservatism. Instead, social conservatism describes conservative moral and social values, or traditionalist conservative stances on socio-cultural issues, such as abortion and same-sex marriage, in opposition to cultural liberalism (social liberalism in the United States). Meanwhile, nationalism also differs from cultural conservatism as it does not always focus upon a particular culture.

== Arguments ==
=== In favor ===
Proponents argue that cultural conservatism preserves the cultural identity of a country. They often promote cultural assimilation into the dominant culture, believing that monoculturalism is more constructive to national unity. They claim that assimilation facilitates the integration of immigrants and ethnic minorities into broader society, framing cultural conservatism as a solution to ethnic strife. Researchers note that the more culturally homogeneous a community is, the more people trust each other; a finding which has been substantiated by empirical literature demonstrating ethnic and cultural diversity to be inversely related to social cohesion and trust.

Proponents of cultural conservatism have criticized multiculturalism, believing that cultural pluralism is detrimental to a unified national identity. They argue that cultural diversity only serves to marginalize immigrants by othering them as outsiders in society. In some countries, multiculturalism is believed to create de facto racial segregation in the form of ethnic enclaves. Opposition to immigration is also a common stance among proponents. Immigrants often bring their home countries' cultures, religions, and languages with them, sometimes influencing and changing the cultures of their host countries. Proponents of cultural conservatism argue that some of these imported cultural practices, such as hijabs, polygamy, child marriage, and female genital mutilation, are in direct conflict with the values of the dominant culture.

=== Against ===
Opponents argue that cultural conservatism harms cultural diversity. They criticize cultural conservatism for promoting cultural intolerance, creating narrow ethnocentric mindsets, and stifling self-expression. Opponents cite numerous historical atrocities that originated from extreme forms of cultural conservatism, such as racism, genocide, ethnic cleansing, colonialism, and racial segregation. They claim that cultural assimilation leads to the marginalization of minorities who do not conform to the dominant culture.

Opponents have supported multiculturalism, believing it creates a more diverse and tolerant society. They claim it helps people of the ethnic majority to learn more about other cultures, adapt better to social change, and be more tolerant of diversity. They also believe multiculturalism brings more attention to the historical accomplishments of other ethnic groups, which had been neglected in past times. Support for immigration is also a common stance among opponents of cultural conservatism, who argue that it enriches society by contributing diverse new ideas. In some cases, the art, music, food, or clothing of the immigrants are adopted by the dominant culture.

== By country ==
=== Australia ===
In 2006, the Australian Government proposed to introduce a compulsory citizenship test which would assess English skills and knowledge of Australian values. This sparked a debate over cultural conservatism in Australia. Andrew Robb told a conference that some Australians worried that interest groups had transformed multiculturalism into a philosophy that put "allegiances to original culture ahead of national loyalty, a philosophy which fosters separate development, a federation of ethnic cultures, not one community."

The One Nation Party is a conservative political party that opposes multiculturalism, calling it "a threat to the very basis of the Australian culture, identity and shared values."

=== Canada ===
Unlike the United States, while there was a central culture, Canada has always been a culturally divided country, though to varying degrees. Since the premiership of Pierre Trudeau, Canadian identity has been viewed as a cultural mosaic. Trudeau Sr. once stated that there is "no such thing as a model or ideal Canadian," and that to desire one is a "disastrous" pursuit. His son Justin Trudeau, likewise Prime Minister, has continued to spread this spirit in declaring Canada "the first post-national state" due to its lack of a core identity and mainstream. The fifth wave of immigration to Canada which followed Trudeau Sr.'s premiership and continues to this day is the largest manifestation of this change. For example, the city of Richmond, British Columbia is majority Chinese, and nearly half of Torontonians are foreign-born, the city which now bears the motto "Diversity Our Strength." Canadian cultural conservatism as a reaction to the multiculturalism of Pierre Trudeau (and subsequently of Brian Mulroney) reached its peak with the Reform Party and waned over time. Its decline has been marked by the electoral failure of the People's Party of Canada, which formed partly as a response to the Conservative Party's perceived weakness on the issue.

==== Quebec ====
Quebec is unique in Canada for its cultural conservatism. Though not a socially conservative province, nor religiously conservative (not since the aftermath of the Grande Noirceur), Quebecois culture has always maintained a certain suspicion and reluctance towards unity with the rest of Canada. Language protectionism (reflected in laws such as Bill 101) is a central concern of Quebec cultural conservatives. Quebec has held two referendums on separation and has never ratified the Constitution Act of 1982. The Bloc Québécois formed in reaction to the Mulroney premiership (like the Reform Party) to advocate for Quebecois interests in the federal parliament. It once held the office of Official Opposition, which was followed by a decline, but the party has seen greater popularity as of late, currently holding 22 of Quebec's 78 seats in the House of Commons.

=== China ===
During the May Fourth Movement, Xueheng School was the main school of thought advocating cultural conservatism. In contemporary China, cultural conservatism mainly has greater influence among the emerging middle class, and it overlaps with various other ideological trends such as liberalism, neoauthoritarianism, the New Left, and neo-nationalism.

Central to the ideas of the Cultural Revolution was the elimination of the Four Olds, which were elements of Chinese culture that at the time were seen to oppose the goals of Communism in China. However, the Chinese Communist Party (CCP) at the time protected some of the most important Chinese historical monuments, including some archaeological discoveries such as the Terracotta Army.

After the Reform and Opening Up, the Chinese Communist Party have shifted its stance and adapted cultural conservatism. The chief ideologue and the gray eminence of the Chinese Communist Party, Wang Huning, has criticized the western youth for their supposed rejection of traditional western values in his writing; Wang argues for a culturally unified and traditionalist China, albeit mixed with Marxist-Leninist theories. CCP general secretary Xi Jinping has overseen a revival in the popularity of historical Chinese cultural figures such as Confucius. He has placed more emphasis on the value of Chinese culture than his predecessors and has included it among his "comprehensive" political goals. Furthermore, Xi Jinping has also accelerated the crackdown on LGBTQ+ activism and pornography production. Preservation of traditional culture is a major concern of modern Chinese conservatism.

=== Germany ===
In Germany, parallel societies established by some immigrant communities have been criticized by cultural conservatives, giving rise to the concept of the Leitkultur. Conservative Chancellor Angela Merkel of the Christian Democratic Union described attempts to build a multicultural German society to have "failed, utterly failed". Many Germans have expressed alarm over the large number of Muslim immigrants in their country, many of whom have failed to integrate into German society.

=== Italy ===
Italy is a culturally conservative society. Recent surveys show that the vast majority of Italians want fewer immigrants to be allowed into the country, while few want to keep the current level or increase immigration.

=== Japan ===
Japan has been a culturally conservative society. Being monocultural, it has traditionally refused to recognize ethnic differences in Japan.

=== Netherlands ===
Paul Cliteur criticized multiculturalism, political correctness, cultural relativism, and non-Western cultural values. He argued that cultural relativism would lead to acceptance of outdated practices brought to the Western World by immigrants such as sexism, homophobia, and antisemitism.

Paul Scheffer believes that cultural conservatism and integration are necessary for a society, but the presence of immigrants undermines this. He cites failure to assimilate, de facto segregation, unemployment, crime, and Muslim opposition to secularism as the main problems resulting from immigration.

=== Russia ===
In Russia, Russian culture has been defended by cultural conservatives on the grounds that the destruction of traditional values is undemocratic.

=== United Kingdom ===
In the 20th century, immigration to the United Kingdom gave rise to multicultural policies. However, a report from the University of York in 2010 stated that since the beginning of the 21st century the UK government moved towards cultural conservatism and the assimilation of minority communities. Opposition has grown to multicultural government policies, with some viewing it as a costly failure. After the 7 July 2005 London bombings, the Conservative politician David Davis called such policies "outdated".

Ed West argues that the British establishment had blindly embraced multiculturalism without proper consideration of the downsides of ethnic diversity. According to cultural conservatives, while minority cultures are allowed to remain distinct, traditional British culture is abhorred for being exclusive and adapts to accommodate minorities, often without the consent of the local population.

=== United States ===
A prominent criticism by cultural conservatives in the United States is that multiculturalism undermines national unity, hinders social integration, and leads to the fragmentation of society. Samuel P. Huntington described multiculturalism as an anti-Western ideology that attacked the United States' inclusion in Western civilization, denied the existence of a common American culture, and promoted ethnic identities over national ones.

Discussions to do with the conservation of American culture often involve definitional disputes. Some consider the United States as a nation of immigrants or "melting pot," others (such as David Hackett Fischer) argue that British immigrant cultures are responsible for the development of modern American culture and values. American cultural conservatives often claim that the culture is at risk due primarily to demographic change from immigration, as well as the influence of academia, which has produced increasingly left-wing alumni over time. Dinesh D'Souza argues that multiculturalism in American universities undermines the moral universalism that education once stood for. In particular, he criticized the growth of ethnic studies programs.

== List of cultural conservative political parties ==
=== Australia ===
==== Parliamentary parties ====
===== Represented in federal parliament =====
- Katter's Australian Party
- Liberal–National Coalition (factions)
  - Country Liberal Party (factions)
  - Liberal Party (factions)
    - Centre Right faction
    - National Right faction
  - Liberal National Party of Queensland (factions)
  - National Party
- Pauline Hanson's One Nation
- United Australia Party

===== Represented in state and territory parliaments =====
- Australian Christians
- Libertarian Party
- Shooters, Fishers and Farmers Party

==== Extra-parliamentary parties ====
- Australia First Party
- Australian Protectionist Party
- Democratic Labour Party
- Family First Party
- Freedom Party of Victoria
- Gerard Rennick People First
- The Great Australian Party
- Trumpet of Patriots

=== Bulgaria ===
- Bulgarian National Union – New Democracy

=== Canada ===
- Canadian Nationalist Party (defunct)
- People's Party of Canada
- Coalition Avenir Quebec

=== China ===
- Chinese Communist Party

=== Czech Republic ===
- Freedom and Direct Democracy

=== Denmark ===
- Danish People's Party
- Social Democrats

=== Estonia ===
- Conservative People's Party of Estonia

=== Finland ===
- Blue and White Front
- Power Belongs to the People

=== France ===
- Blue, White and Red Rally
- National Rally
- Reconquête

=== Germany ===
- Bündnis Sahra Wagenknecht

=== Greece ===
- Greek Solution
- Greeks for the Fatherland
- LEPEN
- National Popular Consciousness

=== Hungary ===
- Fidesz
- Our Homeland Movement

=== Italy ===
- Lega Nord
- Lega per Salvini Premier

=== Netherlands ===
- Forum for Democracy
- Party for Freedom

=== New Zealand ===
- New Zealand First

=== Poland ===
- Law and Justice

=== Portugal ===
- CDS-PP
- Chega
- Ergue-te

=== Romania ===
- Alliance for the Union of Romanians
- People's Movement Party
- Romanian Nationhood Party

=== Serbia ===
- Serbian Party Oathkeepers

=== South Korea ===
- Dawn of Liberty Party

=== Spain ===
- Vox
- Worker's Front

=== Sweden ===
- Alternative for Sweden
- Sweden Democrats

=== Trinidad and Tobago ===
- United National Congress

=== United Kingdom ===
- Social Democratic Party

=== United States ===
- Constitution Party
- Republican Party (majority faction)

== See also ==
- Criticism of multiculturalism
- Cultural appropriation
- Cultural nationalism
- Paleoconservatism
- Paleolibertarianism
- Social conservatism
- Traditionalist conservatism
