= Abirus ceylonicus =

Scientific classification
- Kingdom: Animalia
- Phylum: Arthropoda
- Clade: Pancrustacea
- Class: Insecta
- Order: Coleoptera
- Suborder: Polyphaga
- Infraorder: Cucujiformia
- Family: Chrysomelidae
- Genus: Abirus
- Species: A. ceylonicus

Binomial name
- Abirus ceylonicus Jacoby, 1908

Species of beetles

Abirus ceylonicus is a species of beetle in the leaf beetle family (Chrysomelidae), known only from Sri Lanka. The scientific name of the species was posthumously published in 1908 by Martin Jacoby.
