= Chen Shizeng =

Chinese painter

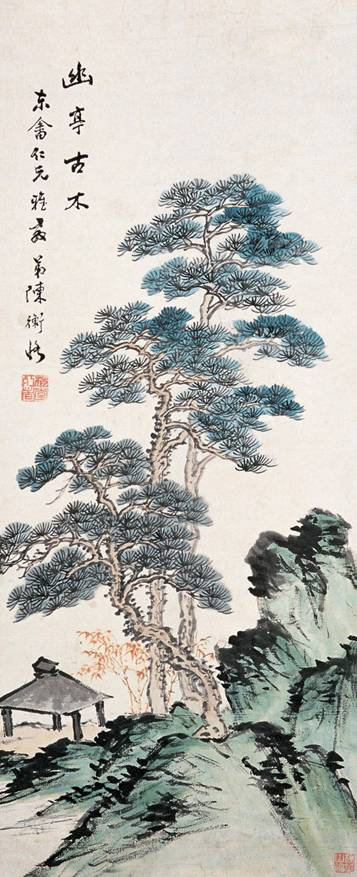
A painting by Chen Shizeng

Chen Shizeng (Chinese: 陈师曾; Wade–Giles: Ch’en Shih-tseng; March 2, 1876, in Fenghuang, Hunan – September 12, 1923, in Nanjing, Jiangsu), original name Chen Hengke, courtesy name Shizeng, art name Xiudaoren Xiuzhe, was a Chinese painter and critic, painter, and educator of early 20th-century China. At a time when some Chinese artists were rejecting traditional painting styles in favor of Western influenced styles, Chen championed traditional literati art in his own art and in his A Study of Chinese Literati Painting.

Shizeng was the son of Chen Baozhen, a Qing dynasty governor of Hunan.

== Biography ==
Shizeng came from a family of notable officials and scholars. Displaying early talents, he engaged in painting, poetry, and calligraphy by the age of 10. In 1902, he pursued further studies in Japan, focusing on natural history while maintaining his practice in traditional Chinese painting and exploring Western art. Returning to China in 1910, a year before the establishment of the Republic of China; Shizeng contributed to the artistic realm as an art teacher, gaining prominence in artistic circles. He would also work to further the careers of various Chinese artists, amongst them: Yao Hua, Wang Yun and Qi Baishi.

Shizeng believed in the value of traditional Chinese painting although he wasn't strictly conservative and would approve of learning from Western Art and experimenting with their innovative techniques. Shen Zhou, Shi Tao, Kuncan, Gong Xian, and Lan Ying are noted to have influenced his landscape paintings. Moreover, his flower paintings were influenced by Ming dynasty painters Chen Chun and Xu Wei. On the other hand, his figure paintings had contemporary life based on life sketches in streets and lanes.

Shizeng cared deeply for the fate of traditional Chinese art, working closely with Omura Seigai, a Japanese art historian to stem the wave of modernization that was spreading. They co-published a book called "The Study of Chinese Literati Painting" in 1922. The books subject focused on the history of Chinese scholar-painters (“literati”) who incorporated their knowledge of poetry and other arts into the paintings they created. Shizeng argued in the book that moral quality, scholarship, literary talent, and emotion were the four essential factors of literati painting.

== Sources ==
- Sullivan, Michael (2006). Modern Chinese Artists: a Biographical Dictionary. University of California Press. p. 17. ISBN 978-0-520-24449-8.
