= Chen Baozhen =

Qing dynasty politician (1831–1900)

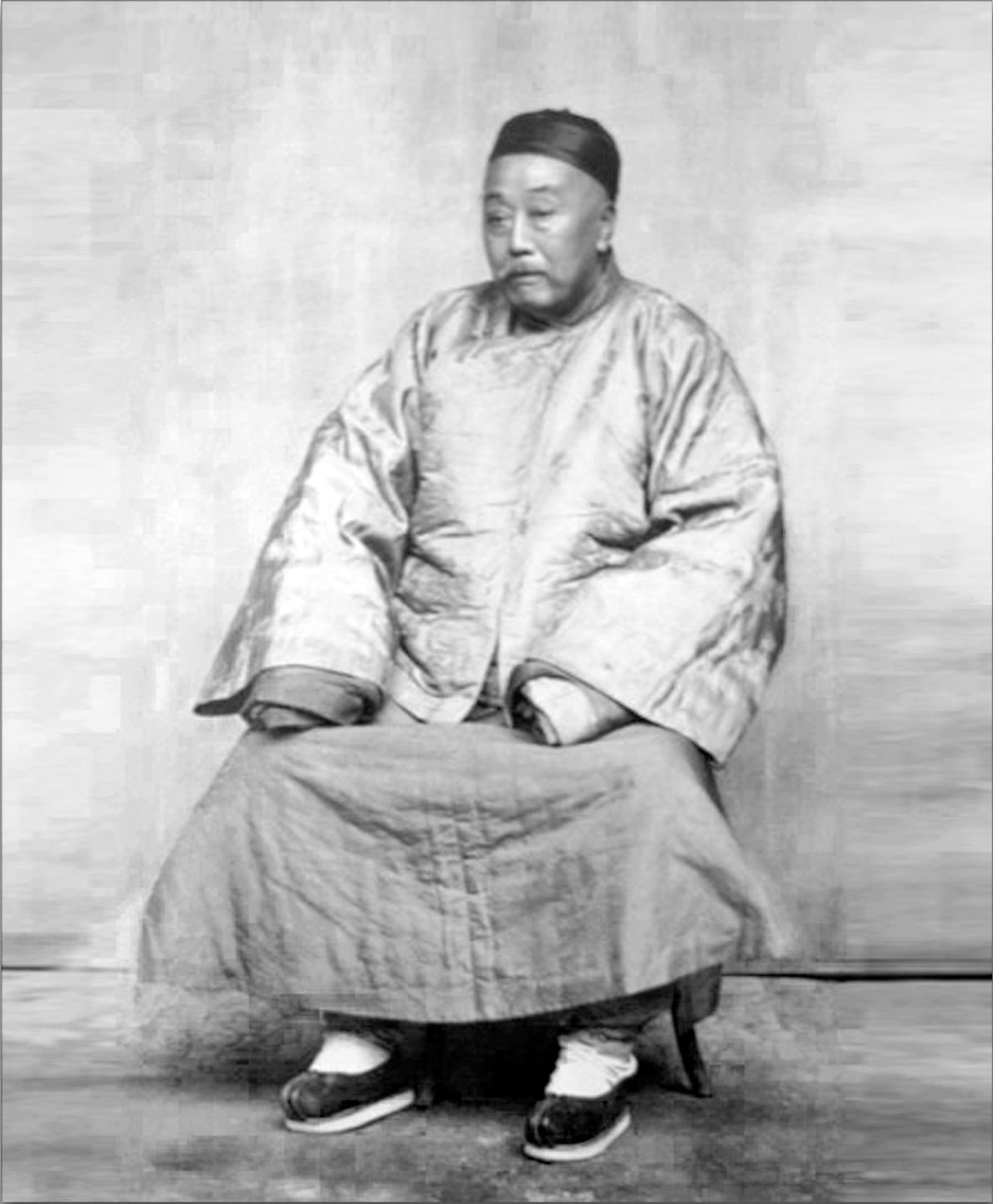
Chen Baozhen

Chen Baozhen (Chinese: 陳寶箴; pinyin: Chén Bǎozhēn; 10 March 1831 – 22 July 1900) was a Chinese statesman and reformer during the Qing dynasty.

Chen was born in Tingzhou (Now Shanghang County). His family originated from Xiushui County in Jiujiang. He obtained the second highest degree in the imperial examinations in 1851. During the Self-Strengthening Movement, Chen became closely associated with Zeng Guofan's efforts to rearm China. In 1895, he was appointed governor of Hunan province, where he carried out a reform program with the aid of Tan Sitong and Liang Qichao. Chen's sympathies to the Hundred Days' Reform attracted criticism from his superiors, especially Empress Dowager Cixi who distrusted reformists such as Chen Baozhen.

He was dismissed from his post in 1898 after the failure of the Hundred days' Reform. Without the support of Guangxu Emperor Chen was no longer protected from conservatives' criticism. Chen died in Nanjing two years later.

During his term in Hunan, Chen promoted his reform with the goal of modernizing Hunan. It was one of the first actual reform carried out in modern China. He also founded the first school in Hunan province which was known for its revolutionary ideals. During the reform, Chen appointed Liang Qichao and Tan Sitong who were active advocates of modernization, a move that met with resistance from Hunan's local conservative gentry. The conservatives disdained the implementation of Western schools in Hunan and set up obstacles for reformists. In order to silence his conservative opponents, Chen enforced censorship on local newspapers. However, conservative pressure on Chen's reform eventually brought an abrupt end to the reform.

Although Chen did not complete the modernization of Hunan, younger elite scholars were influenced by his endeavour. By the early 20th century, Hunan had become one of the most radical reformist provinces in China. Mao Zedong, the founder of the People's Republic of China, was among the younger elites who were influenced by Hunanese reformist ideals.

Chen Baozhen's grandson Chen Yinke was acknowledged as a leading historian of Chinese history. One of his great-grandsons, Chen Fenghuai, was a pioneer of botanic studies in China.

== References and further reading ==
- Stephen R. Platt. Provincial Patriots: The Hunanese and Modern China (Cambridge, Mass.: Harvard University Press, 2007). ISBN 9780674026650.
