= Liu Yizheng =

Chinese intellectual (1880–1956)

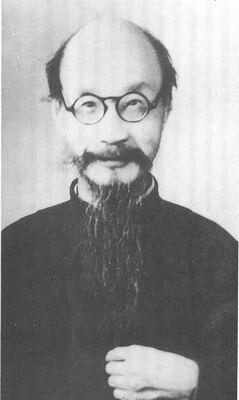
Liu Yizheng

Liu Yizheng (Chinese: 柳詒徵; pinyin: Liǔ Yízhēng; Wade–Giles: Liu I-cheng; 1880–1956) was a Chinese historian, calligrapher, librarian, cultural scholar, educator, and academic leader. He is known for his personal charisma, spirit and eruditeness. In modern Chinese academic field, it is said that the number of famous experts in various fields including in literature, history, geography, philosophy and even natural science he educated and enlighted was the most. Liu Yizheng and Wang Bohang were honorifically called Nanyong Double Pillars (Two pillars of Nanjing University) during the early period of the Republic of China.

== Biography ==
=== Early life under the Qing dynasty ===
Born and educated under the Qing dynasty (1644–1912), Liu passed the first level of the imperial civil service examination a few years before its abolition in 1905. In the early 1900s his mentor the philologist Miao Quansun (繆荃蓀; 1844–1919) put him in charge of writing a textbook on Chinese national history that had been commissioned by the reformist high official Zhang Zhidong (1837–1909). Liu's Brief Account of the Past (Lidai shilue 歷代史略), an adaptation of Japanese historian Naka Michiyo's (那珂通世; 1851–1908) General History of China (Shina tsūshi 支那通史), was published in Nanjing by a government press in 1902. After a two-month visit to Meiji Japan in 1902 during which he was impressed by the new Japanese education system, Liu used his new textbook to teach history in schools that had been created as part of the late Qing "New Policies" (Xinzheng 新政, 1901–1911). In 1905 the new Ministry of Education (Xuebu 學部) officially designated Liu's Brief Account as a national textbook.

=== Republican times ===
After the Qing fell and was replaced by a Republican government, Liu opposed Hu Shih's call for a "literary revolution" that consisted in replacing classical Chinese with more vernacular forms of writing, a kind of reform advocated by the intellectuals of the New Culture Movement. Refusing to ascribe China's recent difficulties to Confucianism or traditional Chinese culture, Liu attributed them to the Manchurian domination, the Opium War, corrupt government, warlords, and all kinds of social problems which, he argued, is not the consequence of practice but the absence of practice of Confucianism.

In the 1920s Liu wrote several historical articles for the Critical Review (Hsuehheng 學衡), a journal that was founded in 1922 at National Southeastern University (later renamed National Central University and Nanjing University). In some of these articles he defended the value of traditional historical scholarship, disagreeing with Gu Jiegang and other advocates of the Doubting Antiquity School, who doubted the reliability of ancient Chinese historical records. Liu's History of Chinese Culture (Zhongguo wenhua shi 中國文化史), a cultural history of China from times immemorial to the 1920s, was first serialized in the Critical Review from 1925 to 1929 before being published as a book in 1932. Though Liu's scholarship is usually viewed as conservative, his book laid the foundation for a discussion of China as a cultural entity rather than a racial one as was common at the time.

In 1927, Liu Yizheng served as the curator of National Study Library (Chinese Study Library) which later merged with National Central Library and formed the new Nanjing Library. In the library he founded Live and Read System, providing long-term devoted readers with vacant rooms to live in. Many such readers later called the library their alma mater.

== Works ==
Liu Yizheng wrote several books on Chinese history, including on the history of education, commerce, and culture. His books also include Business Ethics, An Introduction to Edition, etc. History of Chinese Culture (中國文化史) and Essentials of National History (國史要義) are his most important works.
