= Xiushui County =

Xiushui County 修水县 Siushui; Hsiushui
- County
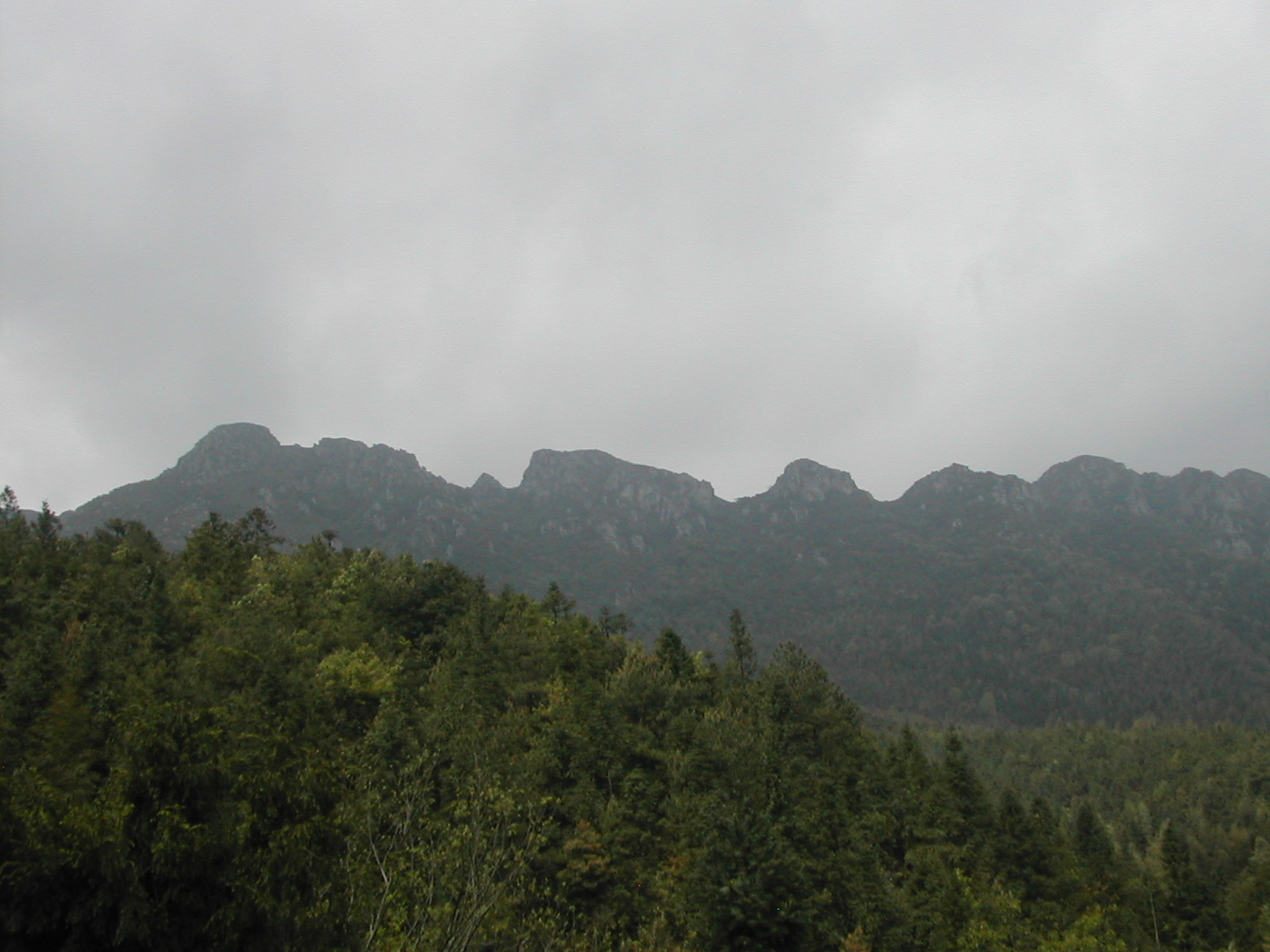

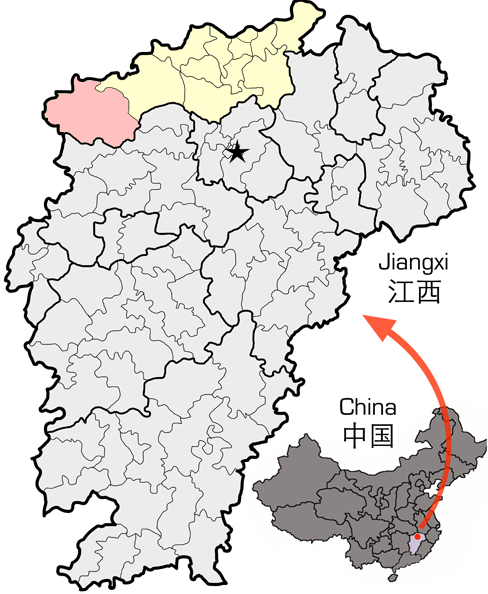
- Location of Xiushui County (red) within Jiujiang City (yellow) and Jiangxi
- Coordinates: 29°01′34″N 114°32′49″E
- Country: People's Republic of China
- Province: Jiangxi
- Prefecture-level city: Jiujiang

Area
  - Total: 4,504 km^{2} (1,739 sq mi)

Population (2017)
  - Total: 882,356
  - Density: 195.9/km^{2} (507.4/sq mi)
- Time zone: UTC+8 (China Standard)
- Postal code: 332400

Xiushui County (Chinese: 修水县; pinyin: Xiūshuǐ Xiàn) is a county in the northwest of Jiangxi Province, China, bordering the provinces of Hunan to the west and southwest and Hubei to the northwest. It is the westernmost county-level division of the prefecture-level city of Jiujiang.

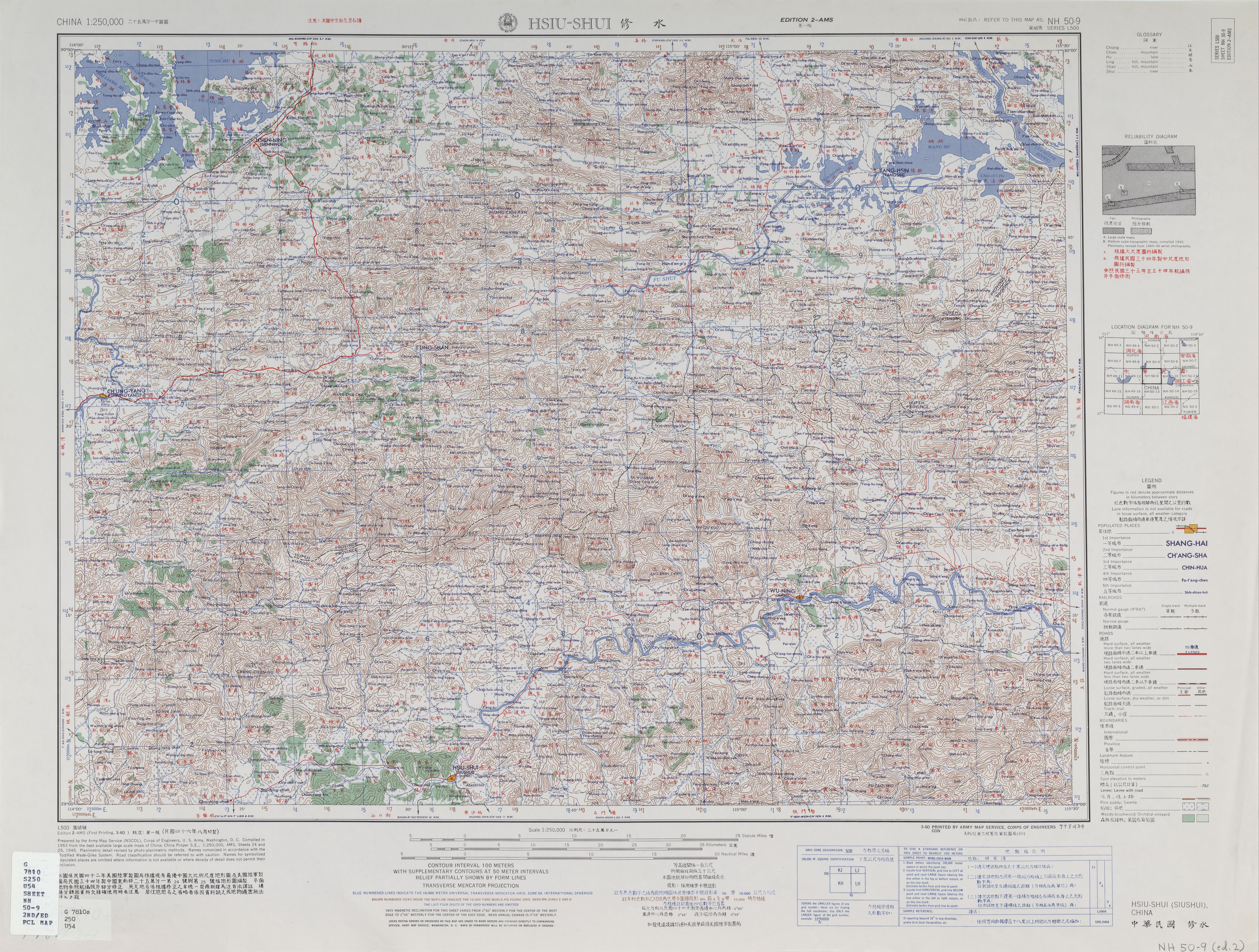
Map including Xiushui (labeled as HSIU-SHUI (SIUSHUI) (walled) 修水) (AMS, 1953)

Xiushui is the largest county in Jiangxi Province and the most populous county in Jiujiang City. It is a sub-central city of Jiujiang City [1]. In 2019, Xiushui County achieved a gross regional product (GDP) of 24.7 billion yuan throughout the year.

Xiushui has a long history. It had been named Aihou in the Shang dynasty and Aiyi in the Spring and Autumn period. It was under the jurisdiction of Wu, Chu and Yue successively. Jian'ai County in the Han dynasty was merged into Jianchang County in the Sui dynasty and Wuning County in the Tang dynasty. In 800 years (in the first year of Dezong Emperor in the Tang dynasty), Xiba Township of Wuning County was built in Fenning County. It was promoted to Ningzhou in the Yuan dynasty and was changed to Ningzhou in 1801 (the sixth year of Jiaqing in the Qing dynasty). In 1912 (the first year of the Republic of China), the name was changed to Ning County, and in 1914, it was renamed Xiushui County, which was named after Xiuhe river within the territory.

== Administrative divisions ==
Xiushui County has 19 towns and 17 townships.

19 towns

- Yining (义宁镇)
- Bailing (白岭镇)
- Quanfeng (全丰镇)
- Gushi (古市镇)
- Daqiao (大桥镇)
- Zhajin (渣津镇)
- Ma'ao (马坳镇)
- Hangkou (杭口镇)
- Gangkou (港口镇)
- Xikou (溪口镇)
- Xigang (西港镇)
- Shankou (山口镇)
- Huangsha (黄沙镇)
- Huanggang (黄港镇)
- Heshi (何市镇)
- Shangfeng (上奉镇)
- Sidu (四都镇)
- Taiyangsheng (太阳升镇)
- Ningzhou (宁州镇)

17 townships

- Lukou (路口乡)
- Huanglong (黄龙乡)
- Shangshan (上衫乡)
- Yuduan (余锻乡)
- Shuiyuan (水源乡)
- Shi'ao (石坳乡)
- Donggang (东港乡)
- Shanghang (上杭乡)
- Xinwan (新湾乡)
- Manjiang (漫江乡)
- Buli (布里乡)
- Manjiang (漫江乡)
- Zhuping (竹坪乡)
- Zhengcun (征村乡)
- Miaoling (庙岭乡)
- Huang'ao (黄坳乡)
- Dachun (大椿乡)

== Climate ==
Climate data for Xiushui, elevation 147 m (482 ft), (1991–2020 normals, extremes 1953–2022)
Month	Jan	Feb	Mar	Apr	May	Jun	Jul	Aug	Sep	Oct	Nov	Dec	Year
Record high °C (°F)	25.7 (78.3)	28.7 (83.7)	33.4 (92.1)	33.6 (92.5)	36.8 (98.2)	38.4 (101.1)	40.8 (105.4)	44.9 (112.8)	39.1 (102.4)	40.6 (105.1)	32.6 (90.7)	25.1 (77.2)	44.9 (112.8)
Mean daily maximum °C (°F)	9.8 (49.6)	12.7 (54.9)	17.1 (62.8)	23.6 (74.5)	27.9 (82.2)	30.5 (86.9)	33.9 (93.0)	33.8 (92.8)	30.3 (86.5)	25.0 (77.0)	18.9 (66.0)	12.8 (55.0)	23.0 (73.4)
Daily mean °C (°F)	4.9 (40.8)	7.4 (45.3)	11.4 (52.5)	17.3 (63.1)	21.9 (71.4)	25.1 (77.2)	28.1 (82.6)	27.6 (81.7)	23.9 (75.0)	18.4 (65.1)	12.4 (54.3)	6.9 (44.4)	17.1 (62.8)
Mean daily minimum °C (°F)	1.8 (35.2)	3.9 (39.0)	7.5 (45.5)	12.9 (55.2)	17.6 (63.7)	21.4 (70.5)	24.0 (75.2)	23.6 (74.5)	19.8 (67.6)	14.0 (57.2)	8.2 (46.8)	3.1 (37.6)	13.2 (55.7)
Record low °C (°F)	−8.0 (17.6)	−5.9 (21.4)	−5.4 (22.3)	−1.2 (29.8)	8.0 (46.4)	10.7 (51.3)	17.1 (62.8)	16.5 (61.7)	8.8 (47.8)	0.4 (32.7)	−4.2 (24.4)	−12.1 (10.2)	−12.1 (10.2)
Average precipitation mm (inches)	80.3 (3.16)	94.0 (3.70)	167.5 (6.59)	204.5 (8.05)	220.5 (8.68)	284.7 (11.21)	207.1 (8.15)	126.7 (4.99)	84.2 (3.31)	58.9 (2.32)	81.8 (3.22)	50.6 (1.99)	1,660.8 (65.37)
Average precipitation days (≥ 0.1 mm)	13.2	12.6	16.6	16.2	15.3	16.0	13.7	12.4	8.4	8.4	9.9	10.1	152.8
Average snowy days	4.4	2.6	0.6	0	0	0	0	0	0	0	0.2	1.3	9.1
Average relative humidity (%)	80	79	80	80	81	83	79	80	79	77	79	78	80
Mean monthly sunshine hours	80.3	82.2	97.2	124.6	148.9	139.8	208.9	199.2	165.7	151.5	125.2	119.9	1,643.4
Percentage possible sunshine	25	26	26	32	35	33	49	49	45	43	39	38	37
Source: China Meteorological Administration all-time extreme high all-time October record
