= Liu Boming (philosopher) =

Chinese educator and philosopher (1887–1923)

Liu Boming (simplified Chinese: 刘伯明; traditional Chinese: 劉伯明; pinyin: Liú Bómíng; 1887–1923) was a Chinese educator and philosopher born in the late Qing Dynasty. He is the first Chinese who received a doctor's degree in philosophy.

He finished his work The Theory of Chinese Mind Nature in 1913, and The Philosophy of Taoism in 1915 when he was a Doctoral candidate at Northwestern University in the United States. He introduced western philosophy to China when he was a professor of Nanjing University. Under his influence, the scholars of Xueheng School translated a number of books of classic Greek philosophy into Chinese.

His wife, Chen Fenzi, was a graduate educator with a degree from Columbia University who had studied with John Dewey.
