= Chinese garden =

Style of garden

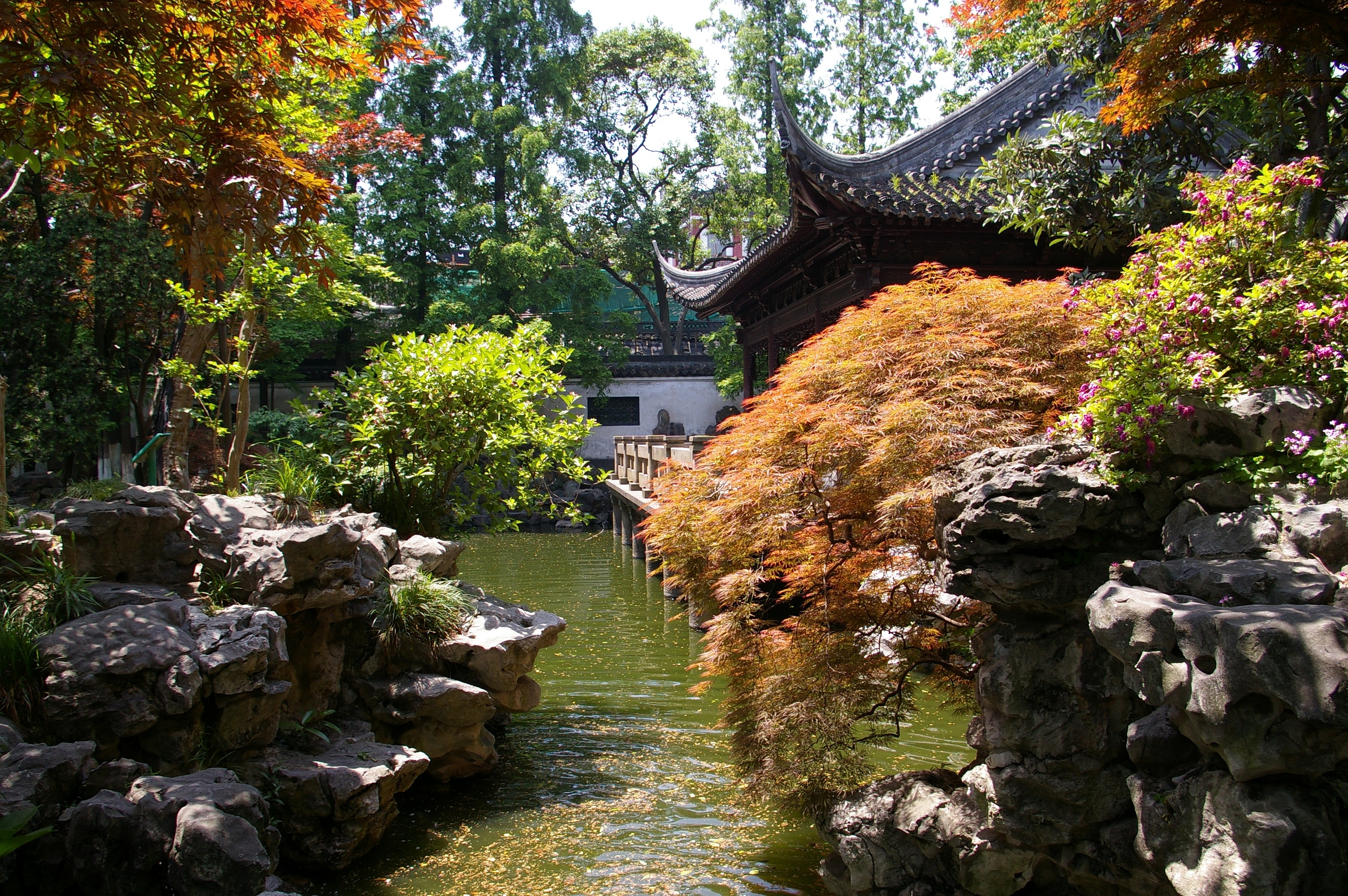
- This picture of the Yuyuan Garden in Shanghai (created in 1559) shows all the elements of a classical Chinese garden – water, architecture, vegetation, and rocks.
- Traditional Chinese: 中國園林
- Simplified Chinese: 中国园林
- Literal meaning: China Garden-Woods
Transcriptions
Standard Mandarin
- Hanyu Pinyin: Zhōngguó yuánlín
Wu
- Romanization: Tson^{1} koh^{4} yoe^{3} lin^{3}

Chinese classical garden
- Traditional Chinese: 中國古典園林
- Simplified Chinese: 中国古典园林
- Literal meaning: China Classical Garden-Woods
Transcriptions
Standard Mandarin
- Hanyu Pinyin: Zhōngguó gǔdiǎn yuánlín
Wu
- Romanization: Tson^{1} koh^{4} ku^{2} di^{3} yoe^{3} lin^{3}

The Chinese garden is a landscape garden style which has evolved over three thousand years. It includes both the vast gardens of the Chinese emperors and members of the imperial family, built for pleasure and to impress, and the more intimate gardens created by scholars, poets, former government officials, soldiers and merchants, made for reflection and escape from the outside world. They create an idealized miniature landscape, which is meant to express the harmony that should exist between man and nature.

The art of Chinese garden integrates architecture, calligraphy and painting, sculpture, literature, gardening and other arts. It is a model of Chinese aesthetics, reflecting the profound philosophical thinking and pursuit of life of the Chinese people. Among them, Chengde Mountain Resort and the Summer Palace, which belong to royal gardens, and several of the Classical Gardens of Suzhou in Jiangsu Province, which belong to private gardens, are also included in the World Heritage List by UNESCO. Many essential elements are used in Chinese gardens, and Moon Gate is one of them.

A typical Chinese garden is enclosed by walls and includes one or more ponds, rock works, trees and flowers, and an assortment of halls and pavilions within the garden, connected by winding paths and zig-zag galleries. By moving from structure to structure, visitors can view a series of carefully composed scenes, unrolling like a scroll of landscape paintings.

== History ==
=== Beginnings ===
The earliest recorded Chinese gardens were created in the valley of the Yellow River, during the Shang dynasty (1600–1046 BC). These gardens were large enclosed parks where the kings and nobles hunted game, or where fruit and vegetables were grown. Early inscriptions from this period, carved on tortoise shells, have three Chinese characters for garden, you, pu and yuan. You was a royal garden where birds and animals were kept, while pu was a garden for plants. During the Qin dynasty (221–206 BC), yuan became the character for all gardens. The old character for yuan is a small picture of a garden; it is enclosed in a square which can represent a wall, and has symbols which can represent the plan of a structure, a small square which can represent a pond, and a symbol for a plantation or a pomegranate tree.

A famous royal garden of the late Shang dynasty was the Terrace, Pond and Park of the Spirit (Lingtai, Lingzhao Lingyou) built by King Wenwang west of his capital city, Yin. The park was described in the Classic of Poetry this way:

The King makes his promenade in the Park of the Spirit,
The deer are kneeling on the grass, feeding their fawns,
The deer are beautiful and resplendent.
The immaculate cranes have plumes of a brilliant white.
The King makes his promenade to the Pond of the Spirit,
The water is full of fish, who wriggle.

Another early royal garden was Shaqui, or the Dunes of Sand, built by the last Shang ruler, King Zhou (1075–1046 BC). It was composed of an earth terrace, or tai, which served as an observation platform in the center of a large square park. It was described in one of the early classics of Chinese literature, the Records of the Grand Historian (Shiji). According to the Shiji, one of the most famous features of this garden was the Wine Pool and Meat Forest (酒池肉林). A large pool, big enough for several small boats, was constructed on the palace grounds, with inner linings of polished oval shaped stones from the seashore. The pool was then filled with wine. A small island was constructed in the middle of the pool, where trees were planted, which had skewers of roasted meat hanging from their branches. King Zhou and his friends and concubines drifted in their boats, drinking the wine with their hands and eating the roasted meat from the trees. Later Chinese philosophers and historians cited this garden as an example of decadence and bad taste.

During the Spring and Autumn period (722–481 BC), in 535 BC, the Terrace of Shanghua, with lavishly decorated palaces, was built by King Jing of the Zhou dynasty. In 505 BC, an even more elaborate garden, the Terrace of Gusu, was begun. It was located on the side of a mountain, and included a series of terraces connected by galleries, along with a lake where boats in the form of blue dragons navigated. From the highest terrace, a view extended as far as Lake Tai, the Great Lake.

=== The Legend of the Isle of the Immortals ===
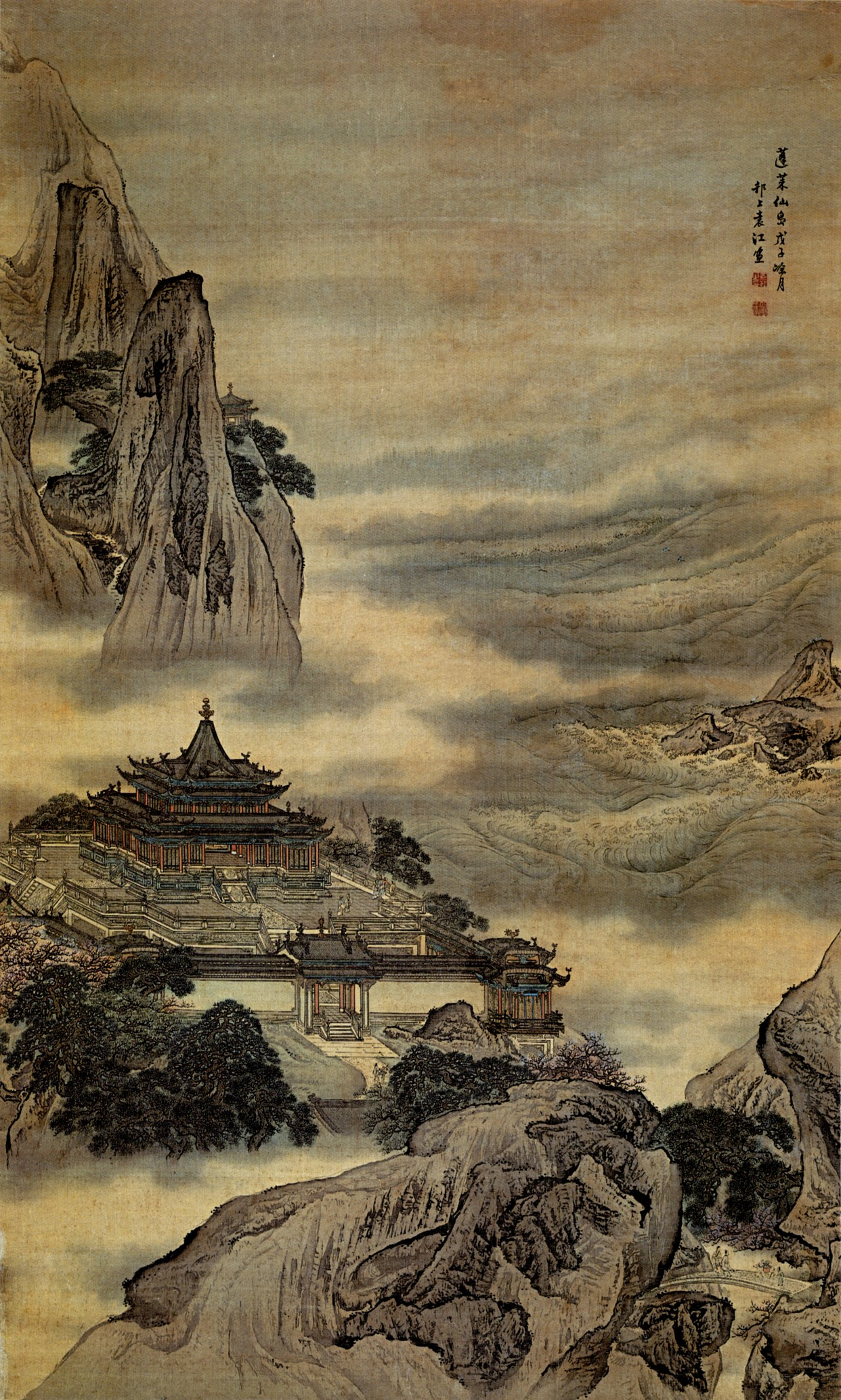
A miniature version of Mount Penglai, the legendary home of the Eight Immortals, was recreated in many classical Chinese gardens

An ancient Chinese legend played an important part in early garden design. In the 4th century BC, a tale in the Classic of Mountains and Seas described a peak called Mount Penglai located on one of three islands at the eastern end of the Bohai Sea, between China and Korea, which was the home of the Eight Immortals. On this island were palaces of gold and silver, with jewels on the trees. There was no pain, no winter, wine glasses and rice bowls were always full, and fruits, when eaten, granted eternal life.

In 221 BC, Ying Zheng, the King of Qin conquered other rival states and unified China under the Qin Empire, which he ruled until 210 BC. He heard the legend of the islands and sent emissaries to find the islands and bring back the elixir of immortal life, without success. At his palace near his capital, Xianyang, he created a garden with a large lake called Lanchi gong or the Lake of the Orchids. On an island in the lake he created a replica of Mount Penglai, symbolizing his search for paradise. After his death, the Qin Empire fell in 206 BC and his capital city and garden were completely destroyed, but the legend continued to inspire Chinese gardens. Some gardens have a single island with an artificial mountain representing the island of the Eight Immortals. Other gardens have gardens featuring three Boshan Mountains - Penglai, Yingzhou, and Fanghu or Fangzhang. The Yichi Sanshan (Chinese: 一池三山) system of one pond with three mountains has been a main model of royal gardens.

=== Han dynasty (206 BC–220 AD) ===
Under the Han dynasty (206 BC – 220 AD), a new imperial capital was built at Chang'an, and Emperor Wu built a new imperial garden, which combined the features of botanical and zoological gardens, as well as the traditional hunting grounds. Inspired by another version of Chinese classic about the Isles of the Immortals, called Liezi, he created a large artificial lake, the Lake of the Supreme Essence, with three artificial islands in the center representing the three isles of the Immortals - Penglai, Fanghu, and Yingzhou. The park was later destroyed, but its memory would continue to inspire Chinese garden design for centuries. The Jianzhang Palace in the Han Dynasty is the first known garden built with the complete set of the three remaining Bohai Shenshan mountains. Since then, the Yichi Sanshan (Chinese: 一池三山) system of one pond with three mountains has been a main model of royal gardens.

Another notable garden of the Han period was the Garden of General Liang Ji built under Emperor Shun (125–144 AD). Using a fortune amassed during his twenty years in the imperial court, Liang Ji built an immense landscape garden with artificial mountains, ravines and forests, filled with rare birds and domesticated wild animals. This was one of the first gardens that tried to create an idealized copy of nature.

=== Gardens for poets and scholars (221–618 AD) ===
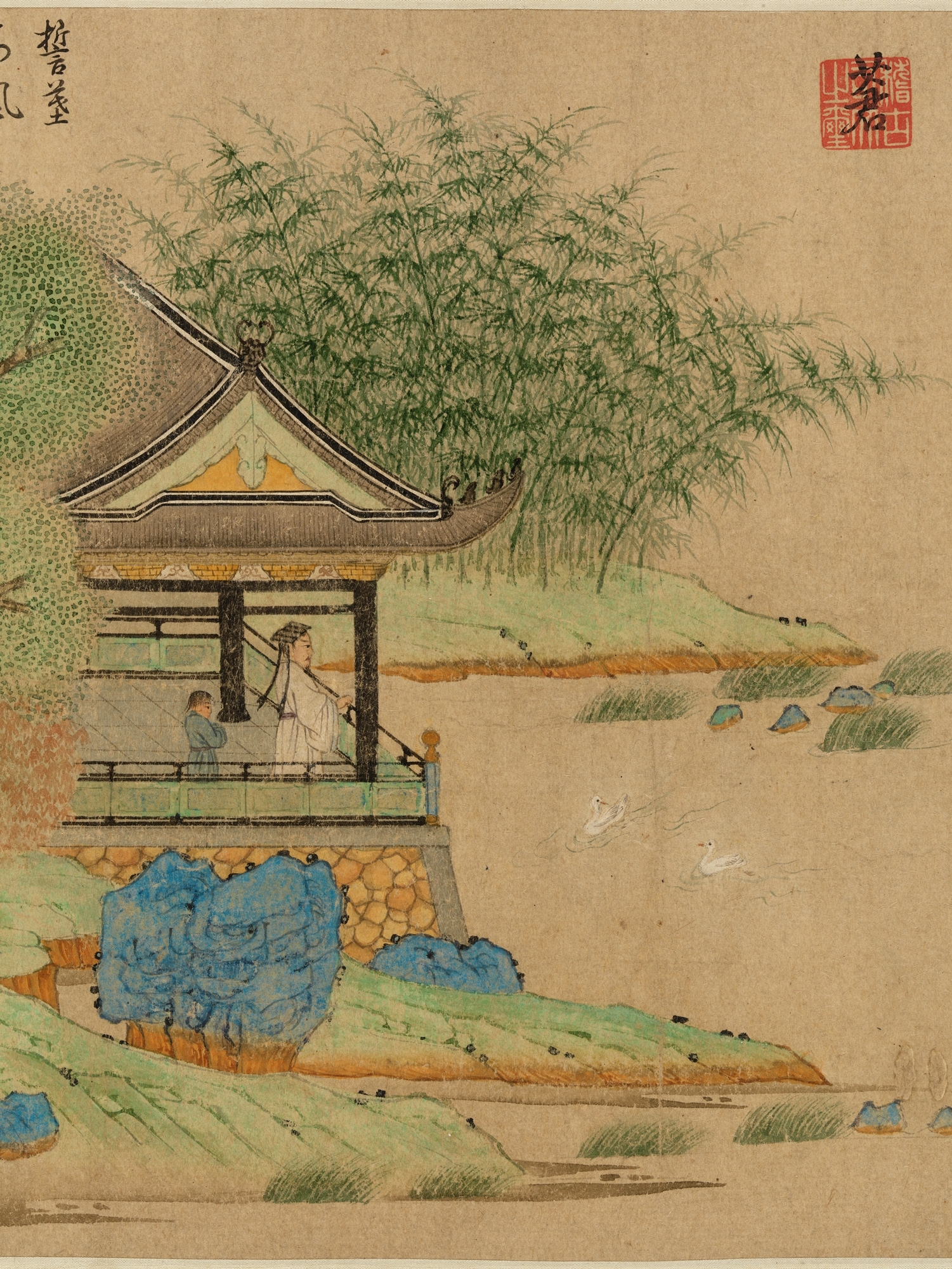
The calligrapher Wang Xizhi in his garden, the Orchid Pavilion

After the fall of the Han dynasty, a long period of political instability began in China. Buddhism was introduced into China by Emperor Ming (57–75 AD), and spread rapidly. By 495, the city of Luoyang, capital of the Northern Wei dynasty, had over 1,300 temples, mostly in the former residences of believers. Each of the temples had its own small garden.

During this period, many former government officials left the court and built gardens where they could escape the outside world and concentrate on nature and literature. One example was the Jingu Yuan, or Garden of the Golden Valley, built in 296 by Shi Chong (249–300 AD), an aristocrat and former court official, ten kilometers northeast of Luoyang. He invited thirty famous poets to a banquet in his garden, and wrote about the event himself:

I have a country house at the torrent of the Golden Valley...where there is a spring of pure water, a luxuriant wood, fruit trees, bambo, cypress, and medicinal plants. There are fields, two hundred sheep, chickens, pigs, geese and ducks...There is also a water mill, a fish pond, caves, and everything to beguile the eye and please the heart....With my literary friends, we took walks day and night, feasted, climbed a mountain to view the scenery, and sat by the side of the stream.

This visit to the garden resulted in a famous collection of poems, Jingu Shi, or Poems of the Golden Valley, and launched a long tradition of writing poetry in and about gardens.

The poet and calligrapher Wang Xizhi (307–365) wrote in his excellent calligraphy the Preface to the Poems Composed at the Orchid Pavilion introducing a book recording the event of the Orchid Pavilion Gathering, another famous poetry setting at a country retreat called the "Orchid Pavilion". This was a park with a meandering stream. He brought together a group of famous poets, and seated them beside the stream. Then he placed cups of wine in the stream, and let them float. If the cup stopped beside one of the poets, he was obliged to drink it and then compose a poem. The garden of the floating cup (liubei tang), with small pavilions and artificial winding streams, became extremely popular in both imperial and private gardens.

The Orchid Pavilion inspired Emperor Yang (604–617) of the Sui dynasty to build his new imperial garden, the Garden of the West, near Hangzhou. His garden had a meandering stream for floating glasses of wine and pavilions for writing poetry. He also used the park for theatrical events; he launched small boats on his stream with animated figures illustrating the history of China.

=== Tang dynasty (618–907), First Golden Age of the Classical Garden ===
The Tang dynasty (618–907 AD) was considered the first golden age of the classical Chinese garden. Emperor Xuanzong built a magnificent imperial garden, the Garden of the Majestic Clear Lake, near Xi′an, and lived there with his famous concubine, Consort Yang.

Painting and poetry reached a level never seen before, and new gardens, large and small, filled the capital city, Chang'an. The new gardens, were inspired by classical legends and poems. There were shanchi yuan, gardens with artificial mountains and ponds, inspired by the legend of the isles of immortals, and shanting yuan, gardens with replicas of mountains and small viewing houses, or pavilions. Even ordinary residences had tiny gardens in their courtyards, with terracotta mountains and small ponds.

These Chinese classical gardens, or scholar's gardens (wenren yuan), were inspired by, and in turn inspired, classical Chinese poetry and painting. A notable example was the Jante Valley Garden of the poet-painter and civil servant Wang Wei (701–761). He bought the ruined villa of a poet, located near the mouth of a river and a lake. He created twenty small landscape scenes within his garden, with names such as the Garden of Magnolias, the Waving Willows, the Kiosk in the Heart of the Bamboos, the Spring of the Golden Powder, and the View-House beside the Lake. He wrote a poem for each scene in the garden and commissioned a famous artist, to paint scenes of the garden on the walls of his villa. After retiring from the government, he passed his time taking boat trips on the lake, playing the cithare and writing and reciting poetry.

During the Tang dynasty, plant cultivation was developed to an advanced level, with many plant species being grown by means of plant introduction, domestication, transplantation, and grafting. The aesthetic properties of plants were highlighted, while numerous books on plant classification and cultivation were published. The capital, Chang'an, was a very cosmopolitan city, filled with diplomats, merchants, pilgrims, monks and students, who carried descriptions of the gardens all over Asia. The economic prosperity of the Tang dynasty led to the increasing construction of classical gardens across all of China.

The last great garden of the Tang dynasty was the Hamlet of the Mountain of the Serene Spring (Pingquan Shanzhuang), built east of the city of Luoyang by Li Deyu, Grand Minister of the Tang Empire. The garden was vast, with over a hundred pavilions and structures, but it was most famous for its collection of exotically shaped rocks and plants, which its creator collected all over China. Rocks of unusual shapes, known as Chinese Scholars' Rocks, often selected to portray the part of a mountain or mountain range in a garden scene, gradually became an essential feature of the Chinese garden.

=== Song Dynasty (960–1279) ===
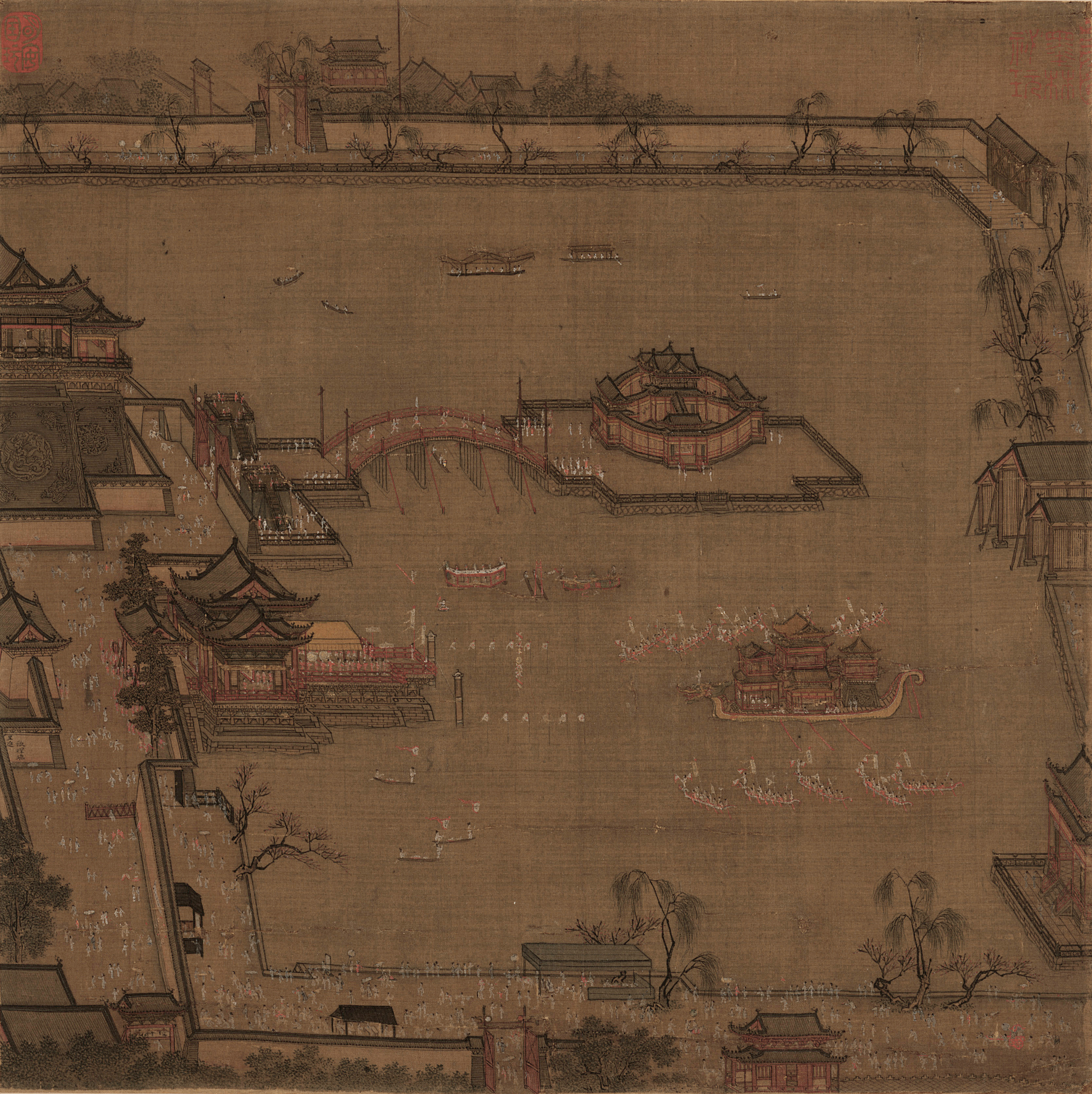
The Lake of the Clarity of Gold, an artificial lake and pleasure garden built by Emperor Huizong of Song at his capital, Kaifeng

There were two periods of the Song dynasty, northern and southern, and both were known for the construction of famous gardens. Emperor Huizong (1082–1135) was an accomplished painter of birds and flowers. A scholar himself, he integrated elements of the scholar garden into his grand imperial garden. His first garden, called The Basin of the Clarity of Gold, was an artificial lake surrounded by terraces and pavilions. The public was invited into the garden in the spring for boat races and spectacles on the lake. In 1117 he personally supervised the building of a new garden. He had exotic plants and picturesque rocks brought from around China for his garden, particularly the prized rocks from Lake Tai. Some of the rocks were so large that, in order to move them by water on the grand canal, he had to destroy all the bridges between Hangzhou and Beijing. In the center of his garden he had constructed an artificial mountain a hundred meters high, with cliffs and ravines, which he named Genyue, or "The Mountain of Stability." The garden was finished in 1122. In 1127, Emperor Huizong was forced to flee from the Song capital, Kaifeng, when it came under attack by the armies of the Jurchen-led Jin dynasty. When he returned (as a captive of the Jurchens), he found his garden completely destroyed, all the pavilions burned and the art works looted. Only the mountain remained.

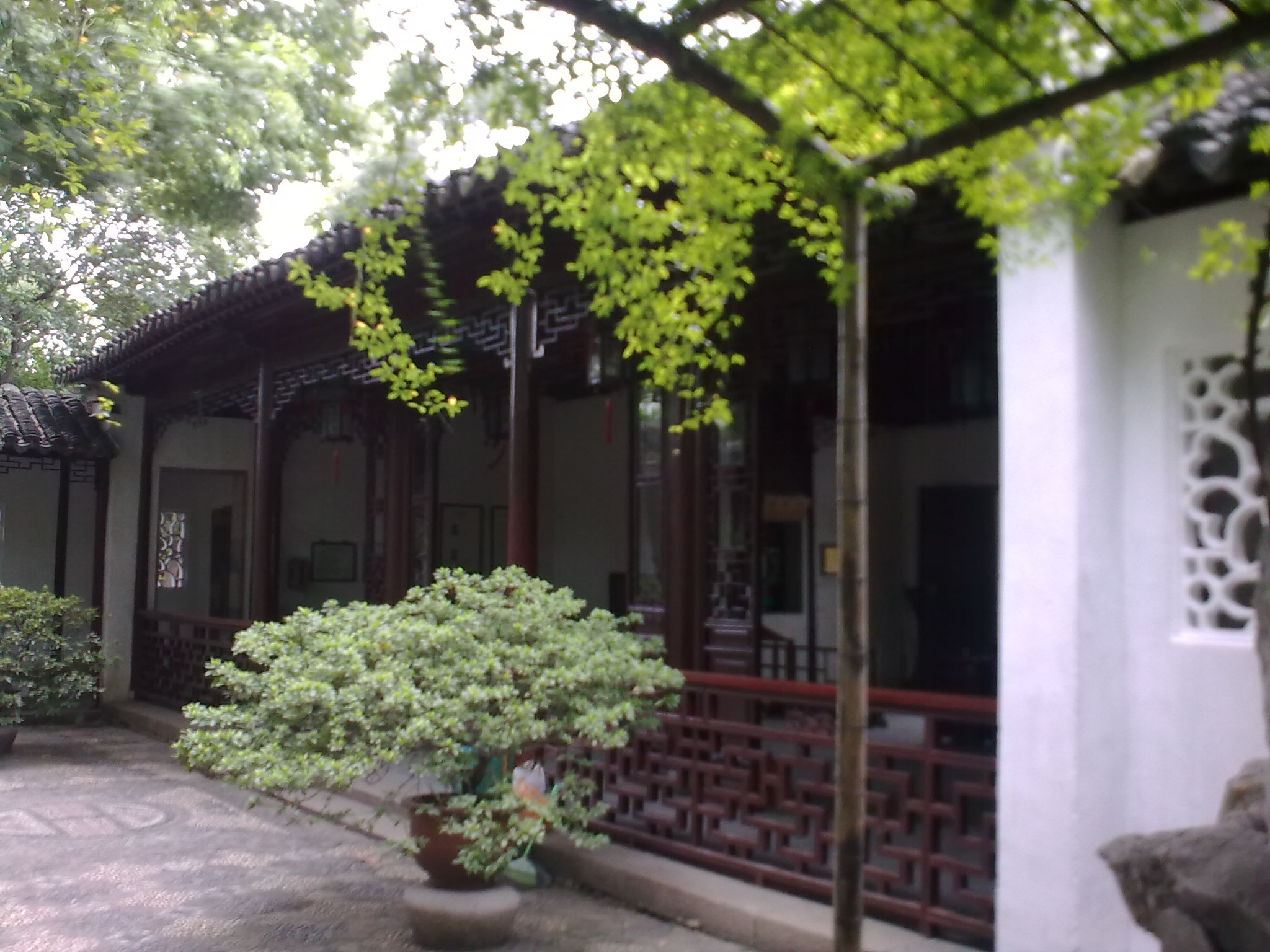
The Blue Wave Pavilion in Suzhou (1044), the oldest extant Song Dynasty Garden

While the imperial gardens were the best known, many smaller but equally picturesque gardens were built in cities such as Luoyang. The Garden of the Monastery of the Celestial Rulers in Luoyang was famous for its peonies; the entire city came when they were in bloom. The Garden of Multiple Springtimes was famous for its view of the mountains. The most famous garden in Luoyang was The Garden of Solitary Joy (Dule Yuan), built by the poet and historian Sima Guang (1021–1086). His garden had an area of eight mu, or about 1.5 hectares. In the center was the Pavilion of Study, his library, with five thousand volumes. To the north was an artificial lake, with a small island, with a picturesque fisherman's hut. To the east was a garden of medicinal herbs, and to the west was an artificial mountain, with a belevedere at the summit to view the surrounding neighborhoods. Any passer-by could visit the garden by paying a small fee.

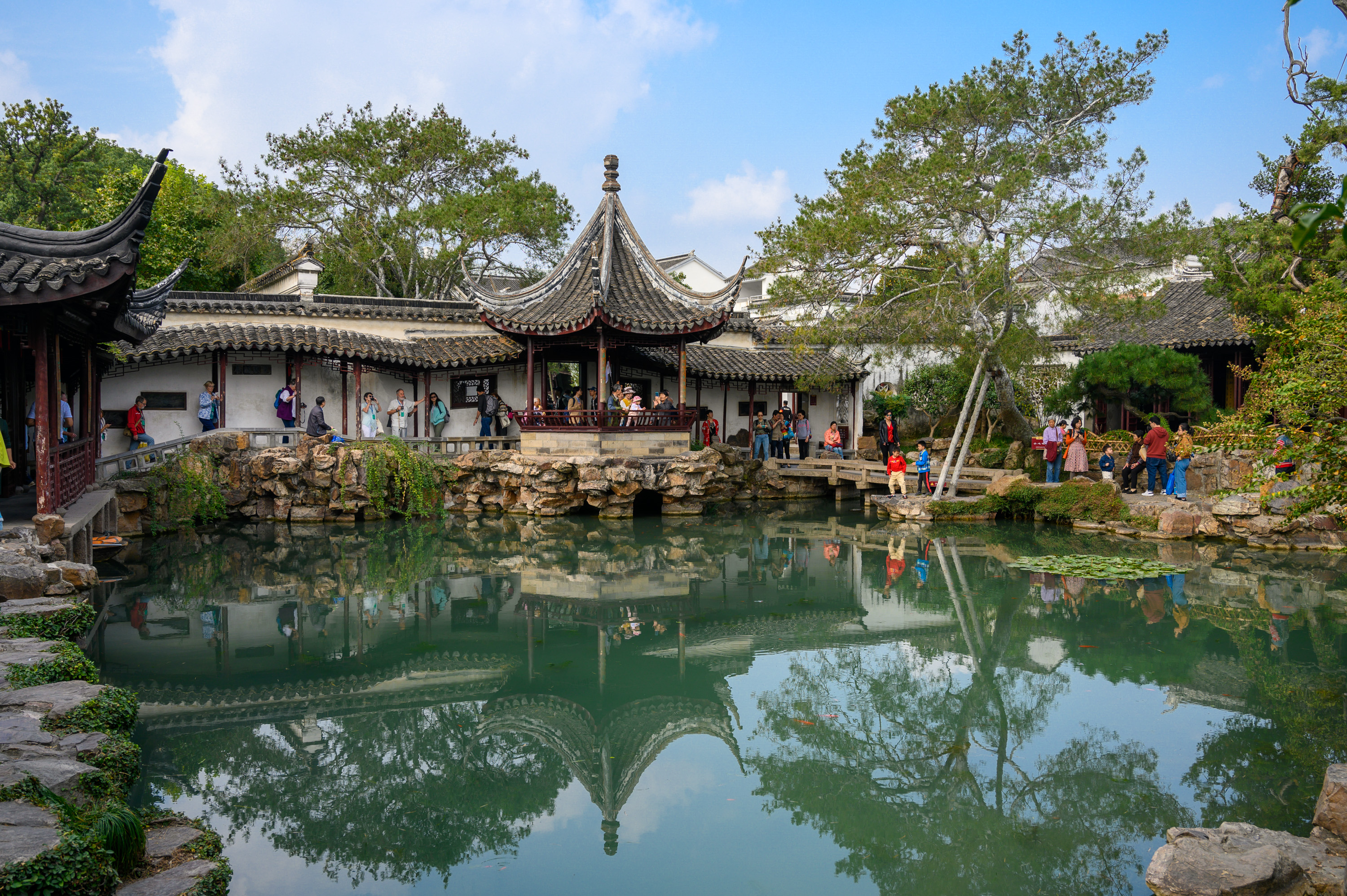
The Master of the Nets Garden in Suzhou (1141) was a model for later scholar's gardens.

After fall of Kaifeng, the capital of the Song dynasty was moved to Lin'an (present-day Hangzhou, Zhejiang). The city of Lin'an soon had more than fifty gardens built on the shore of the Western Lake. The other city in the province famous for its gardens was Suzhou, where many scholars, government officials and merchants built residences with gardens. Some of these gardens still exist today, though most have been greatly altered over the centuries.

The oldest Suzhou garden that can be seen today is the Blue Wave Pavilion, built in 1044 by the Song dynasty poet Su Shunqing. (1008–1048). In the Song dynasty, it consisted of a hilltop viewing pavilion. Other lakeside pavilions were added, including a reverence hall, a recitation hall, and a special pavilion for watching the fish. Over the centuries it was much modified, but still keeps its essential plan.

Another Song dynasty garden still in existence is the Master of the Nets Garden in Suzhou. It was created in 1141 by Shi Zhengzhi, Deputy Civil Service Minister of the Southern Song government. It had his library, the Hall of Ten Thousand Volumes, and an adjacent garden called the Fisherman's Retreat. It was extensively remodeled between 1736 and 1796, but it remains one of the best example of a Song Dynasty Scholars Garden.

In the city of Wuxi, on the edge of Lake Tai and at the foot of two mountains, there were thirty four gardens recorded by the Song dynasty historian Zhou Mi (1232–1308). The two most famous gardens, the Garden of the North (Beiyuan) and the Garden of the South (Nanyuan), both belonged to Shen Dehe, Grand Minister to Emperor Gaozong (1131–1162). The Garden of the South was a classic mountain-and-lake (shanshui) garden; it had a lake with an Island of Immortality (Penglai dao), on which were three great boulders from Taihu. The Garden of the South was a water garden, with five large lakes connected to Lake Tai. A terrace gave visitors a view of the lake and the mountains.

=== Yuan dynasty (1279–1368) ===
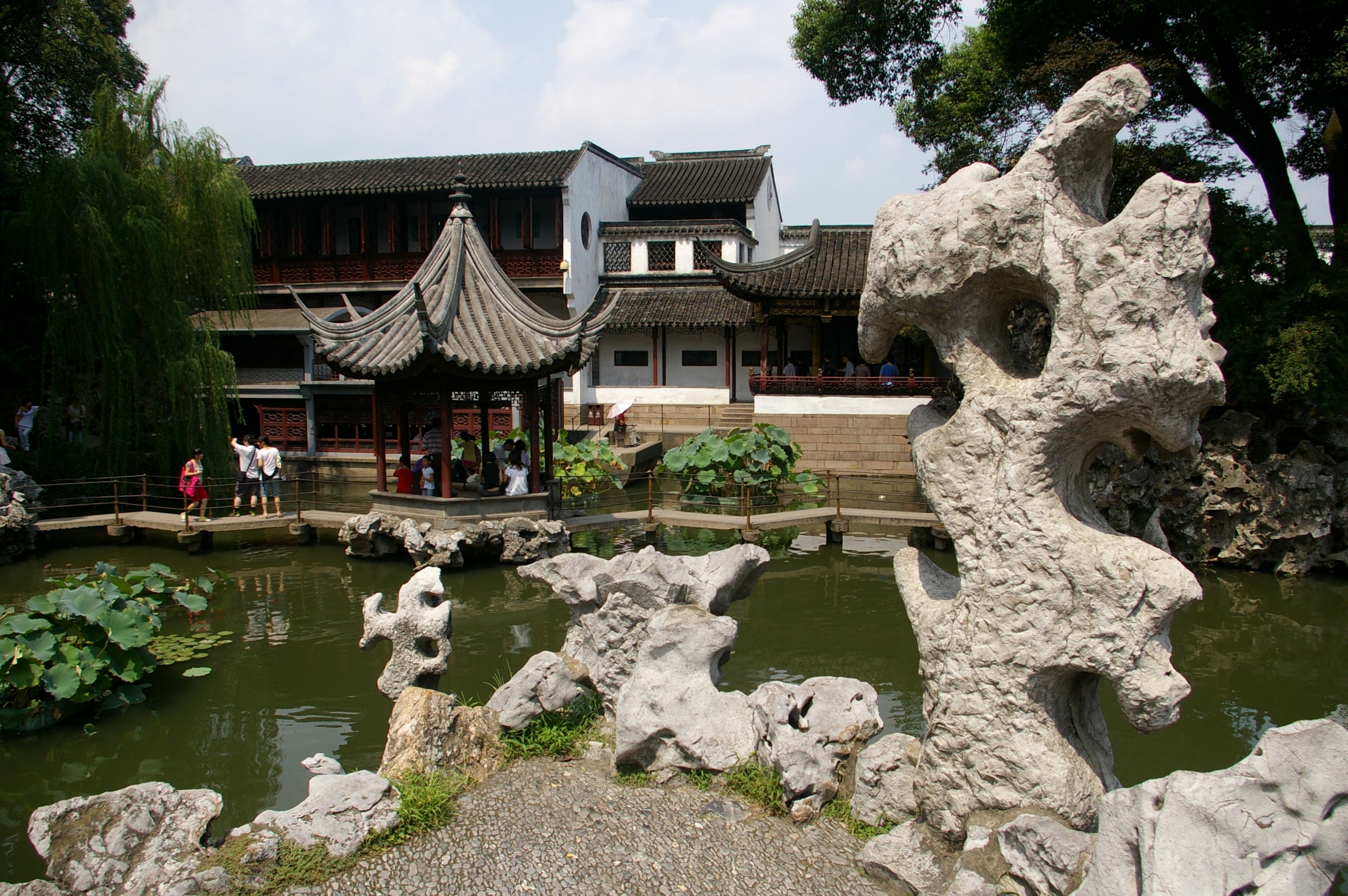
The Lion Grove Garden in Suzhou (1342), known for its fantastic and grotesque rocks

In 1271, Kublai Khan established the Mongol-led Yuan dynasty in China. By 1279, he annihilated the last resistance of the Song dynasty and unified China under Mongol rule. He established a new capital on the site of present-day Beijing, called Dadu, the Great Capital.

The most famous garden of the Yuan dynasty was Kublai Khan's summer palace and garden at Xanadu. The Venetian traveler Marco Polo is believed to have visited Xanadu in about 1275, and described the garden this way:

"Round this Palace a wall is built, inclosing a compass of 16 miles, and inside the Park there are fountains and rivers and brooks, and beautiful meadows, with all kinds of wild animals (excluding such as are of ferocious nature), which the Emperor has procured and placed there to supply food for his gerfalcons and hawks, which he keeps there in mew. Of these there are more than 200 gerfalcons alone, without reckoning the other hawks. The Khan himself goes every week to see his birds sitting in mew, and sometimes he rides through the park with a leopard behind him on his horse's croup; and then if he sees any animal that takes his fancy, he slips his leopard at it, and the game when taken is made over to feed the hawks in mew. This he does for diversion."

This brief description later inspired the poem Kubla Khan by the English romantic poet, Samuel Taylor Coleridge.

When he established his new capital at Dadu, Kublai Khan enlarged the artificial lakes that had been created a century earlier by the Jurchen-led Jin dynasty, and built up the island of Oinghua, creating a striking contrast between curving banks of the lake and garden and the strict geometry of what later became the Forbidden City of Beijing. This contrast is still visible today.

Despite the Mongol invasion, the classical Chinese scholar's garden continued to flourish in other parts of China. An excellent example was the Lion Grove Garden in Suzhou. It was built in 1342, and took its name from the collection of fantastic and grotesque assemblies of rocks, taken from Lake Tai. Some of them were said to look like the heads of lions. The Kangxi and Qianlong emperors of the Qing dynasty each visited the garden several times, and used it as model for their own summer garden, the Garden of Perfect Splendor, at the Chengde Mountain Resort.

In 1368, forces of the Ming dynasty, led by Zhu Yuanzhang, captured Dadu from the Mongols and overthrew the Yuan dynasty. Zhu Yuanzhang ordered the Yuan palaces in Dadu to be burned down.

=== Ming dynasty (1368–1644) ===
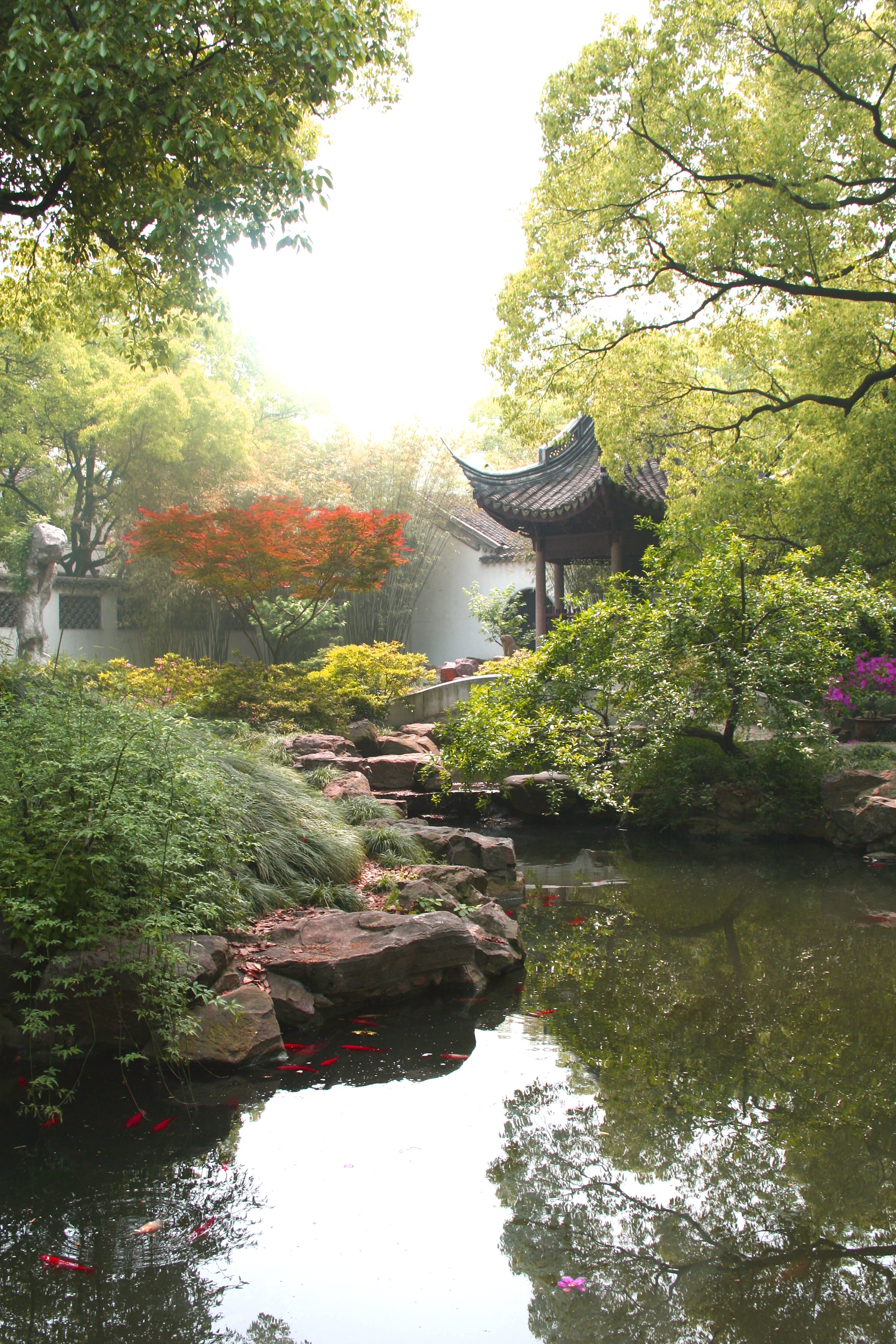
Jichang Garden in Wuxi (1506–1521)

The most famous existing garden from the Ming dynasty is the Humble Administrator's Garden in Suzhou. It was built during the reign of the Zhengde Emperor (1506–1521) by Wang Xianchen, a minor government administrator who retired from government service and devoted himself to his garden. The garden has been much altered since it was built, but the central part has survived; a large pond full of lotus blossoms, surrounded by structures and pavilions designed as viewpoints of the lake and gardens. The park has an island, the Fragrant Isle, shaped like a boat. It also makes good use of the principle of the "borrowed view," (jiejing) carefully framing views of the surrounding mountains and a famous view of a distant pagoda.

Another existing garden from the Ming dynasty is the Lingering Garden, also in Suzhou, built during the reign of the Wanli Emperor (1573–1620). During the Qing dynasty, twelve tall limestone rocks were added to the garden, symbolizing mountains. The most famous was a picturesque rock called the Auspicious Cloud-Capped Peak, which became a centerpiece of the garden.

A third renowned Ming era garden in Suzhou is the Garden of Cultivation, built during the reign of the Tianqi Emperor (1621–27) by the grandson of Wen Zhengming, a famous Ming painter and calligrapher. The garden is built around a pond, with the Longevity Pavilion on the north side, the Fry Pavilion on the east side, a dramatic rock garden on the south, and the creator's study, the Humble House, to the west.

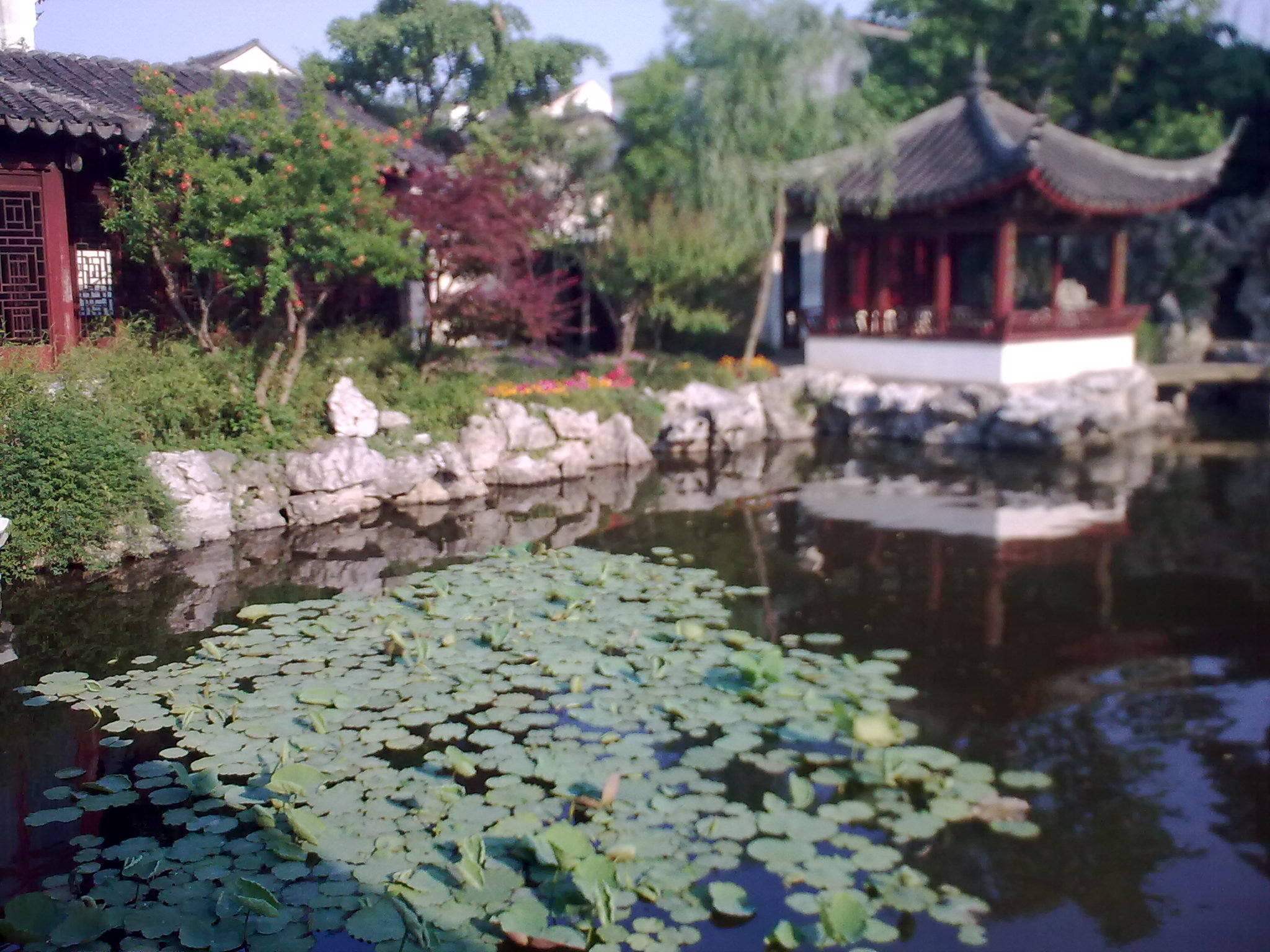
Garden of Cultivation (1541)

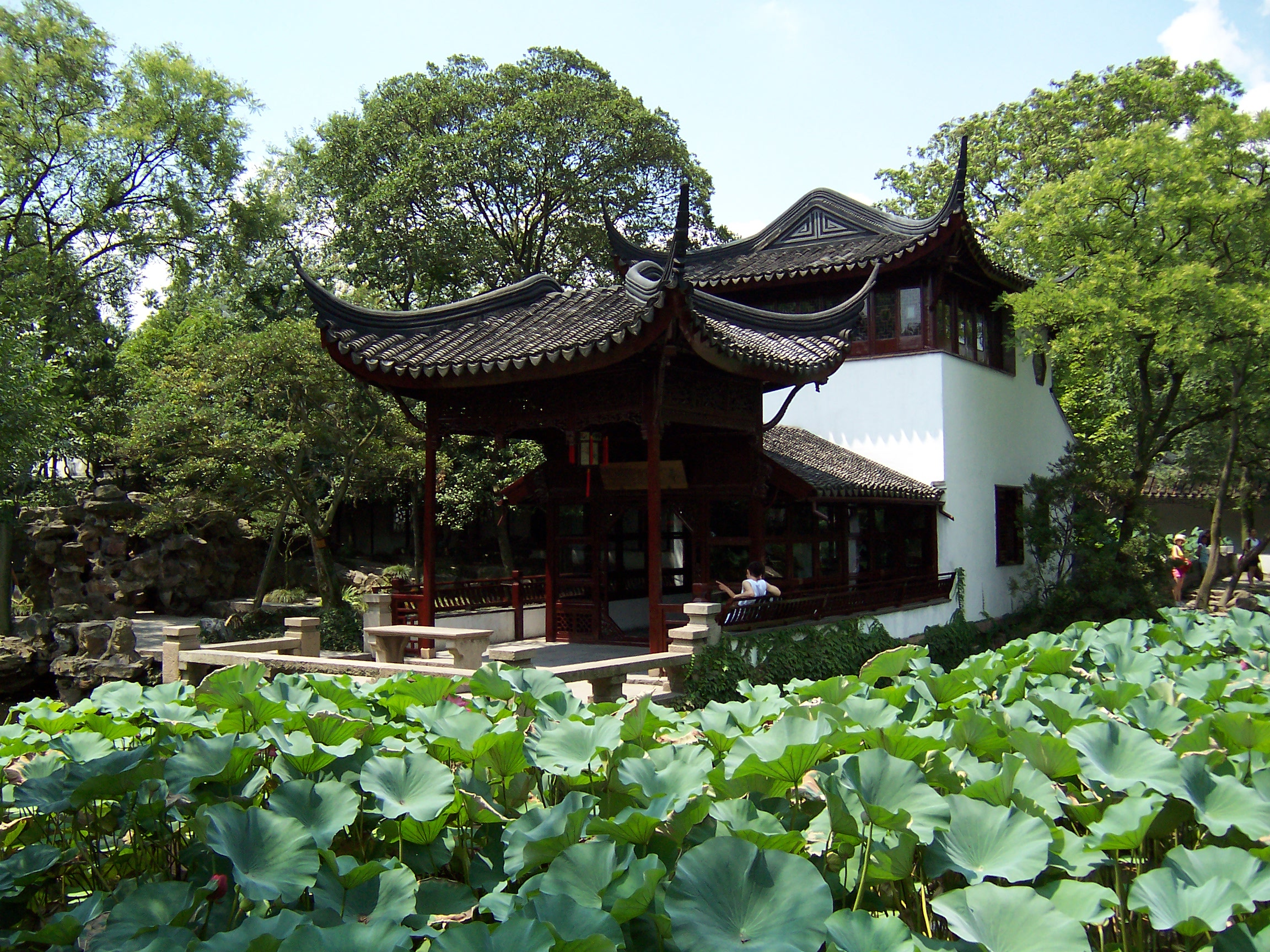
The Humble Administrator's Garden in Suzhou (1506–1521)

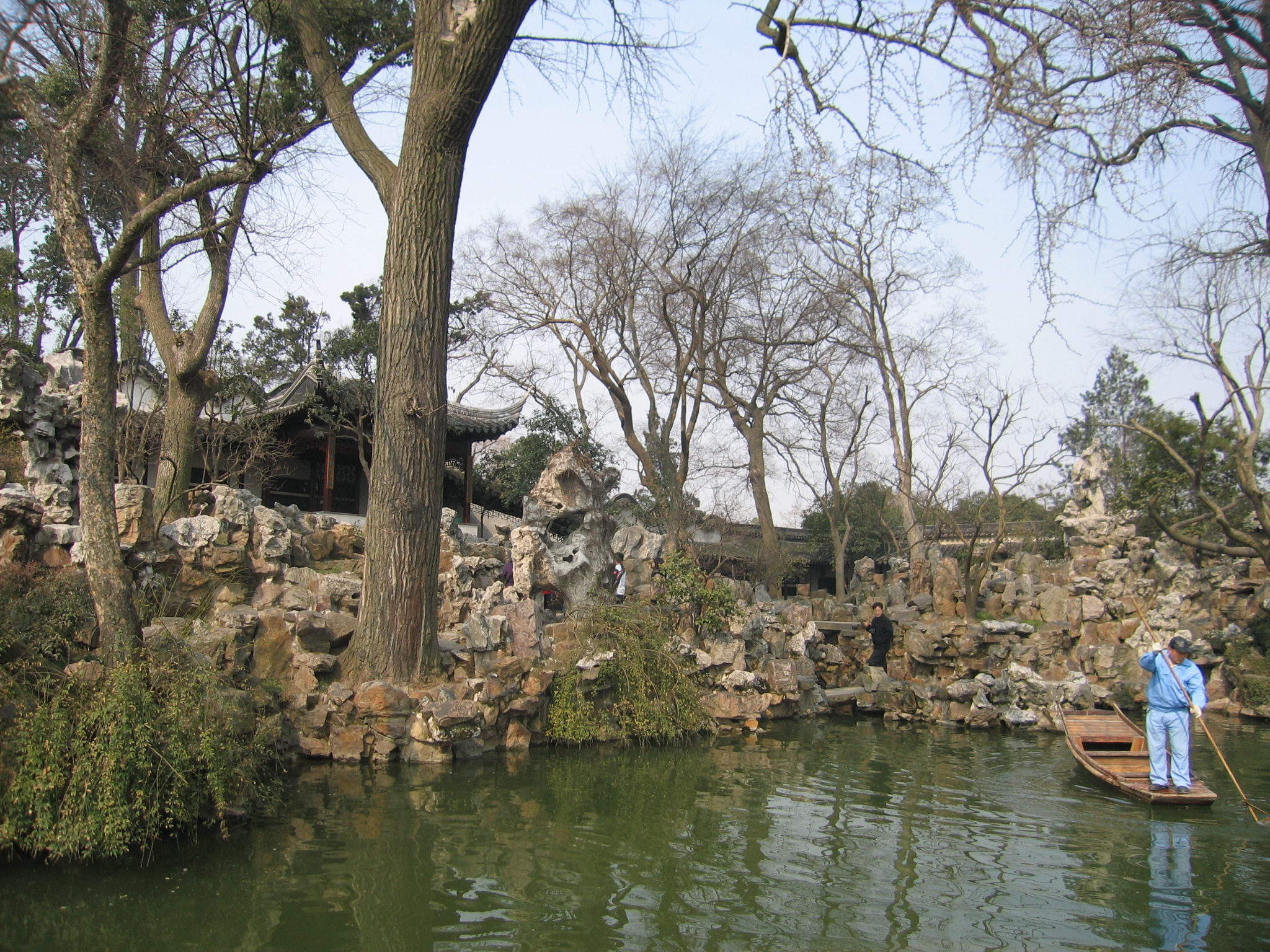
The Lingering Garden in Suzhou (1593), like many Ming dynasty gardens, is filled with dramatic scholar rocks

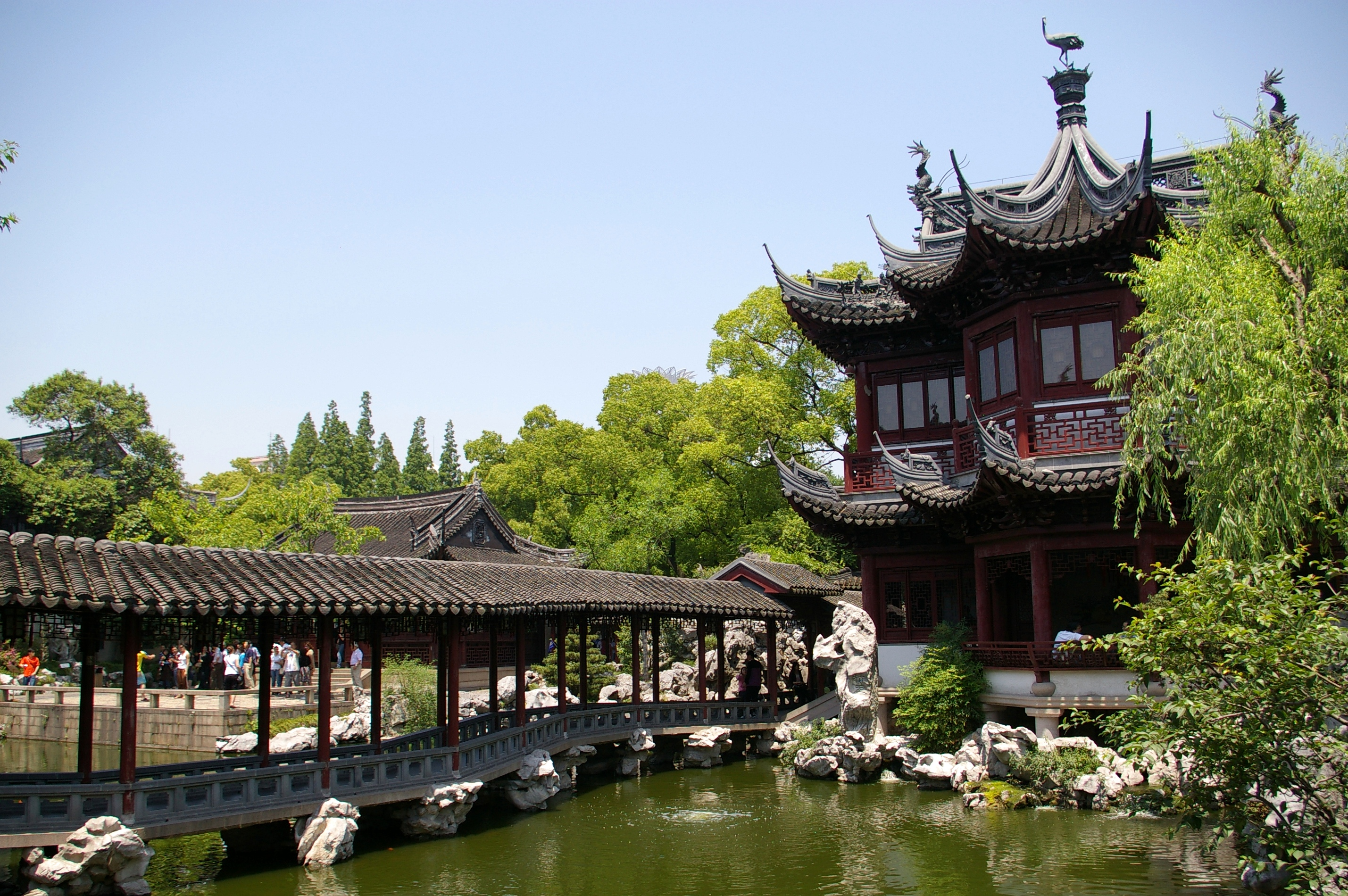
Yuyuan Garden in Shanghai (1559)

=== Qing dynasty (1644–1912) ===
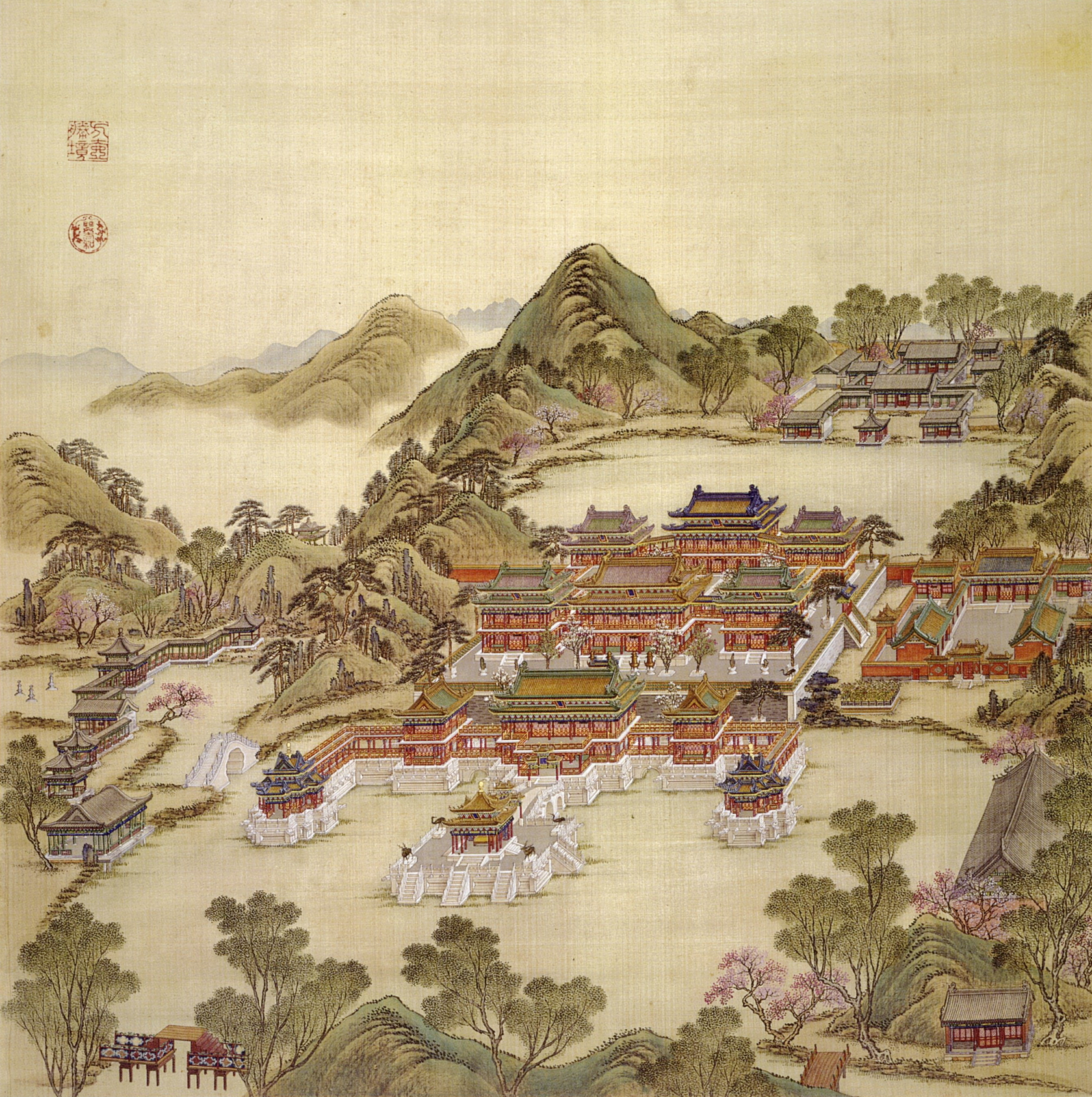
Fanghu Shengjing (Splendid Scenery of the Isle of Fanghu), from the Forty Views of the Yuanmingyuan, painted by Tang Dai and Shen Yuan, 1744, Bibliothèque nationale de France

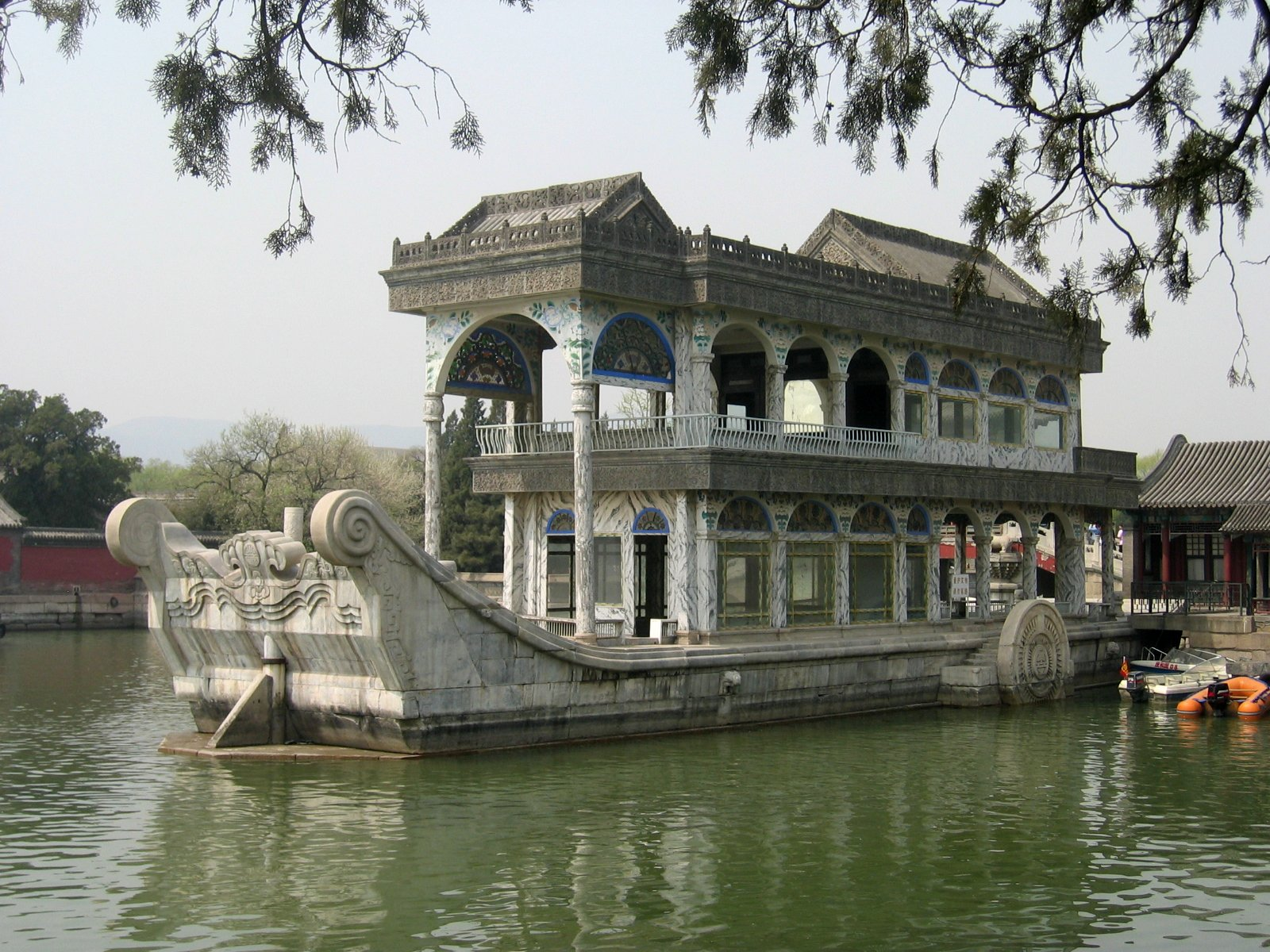
The Marble Boat pavilion in the garden of the Summer Palace in Beijing (1755). After it was destroyed by an Anglo-French expedition in 1860, the Empress Dowager Cixi diverted money from the Beiyang Fleet to have it rebuilt.

The Qing dynasty was the last dynasty of China. The most famous gardens in China during this period were the Summer Palace and the Old Summer Palace in Beijing. Both gardens became symbols of luxury and refinement, and were widely described by European visitors.

Father Attiret, a French Jesuit who became court painter for the Qianlong Emperor from 1738 to 1768, described the Jade Terrace of the Isle of Immortality in the Lake of the Summer Palace:

"That which is a true jewel is a rock or island...which is in the middle of this lake, on which is built a small palace, which contains one hundred rooms or salons...of a beauty and a taste which I am not able to express to you. The view is admirable...

Their construction and improvement consumed a large part of the imperial treasury. Empress Dowager Cixi famously diverted money intended for the modernization of the Beiyang Fleet and used it to restore the Summer Palace and the marble teahouse in the shape of boat on Lake Kunming. Both the Summer Palace and Old Summer Palace were destroyed during the Boxer Rebellion and by punitive expeditions of European armies during the nineteenth century, but are now gradually being restored.

In addition to the Old Summer Palace and Summer Palace, between 1703 and 1792 the Qing emperors built a new complex of gardens and palaces in the mountains 200 kilometers northeast of Beijing, to escape the summer heat of the capital. It was called the Chengde Mountain Resort, and it occupied 560 hectares, with seventy-two separate landscape views, recreating landscapes in miniature from many different parts of China. This enormous garden has survived relatively intact.

Renowned scholar gardens which still exist from this period include the Couple's Retreat Garden (1723–1736) and the Retreat & Reflection Garden (1885), both in Suzhou.

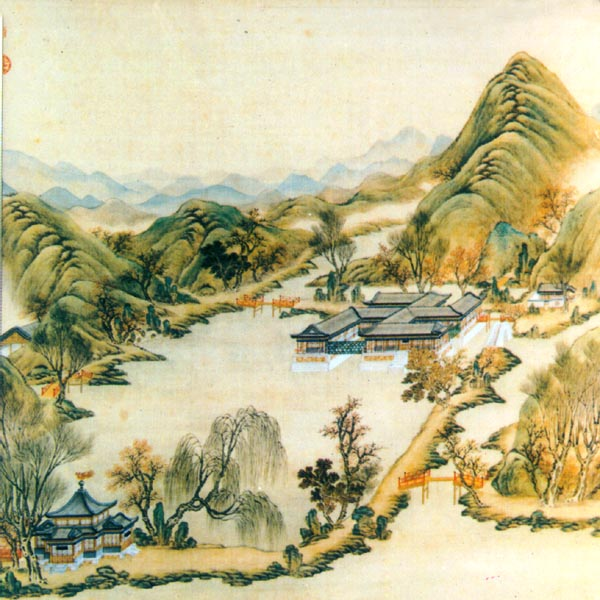
The Old Summer Palace, eight kilometers north of Beijing, was largely destroyed by an Anglo-French expedition in 1860.

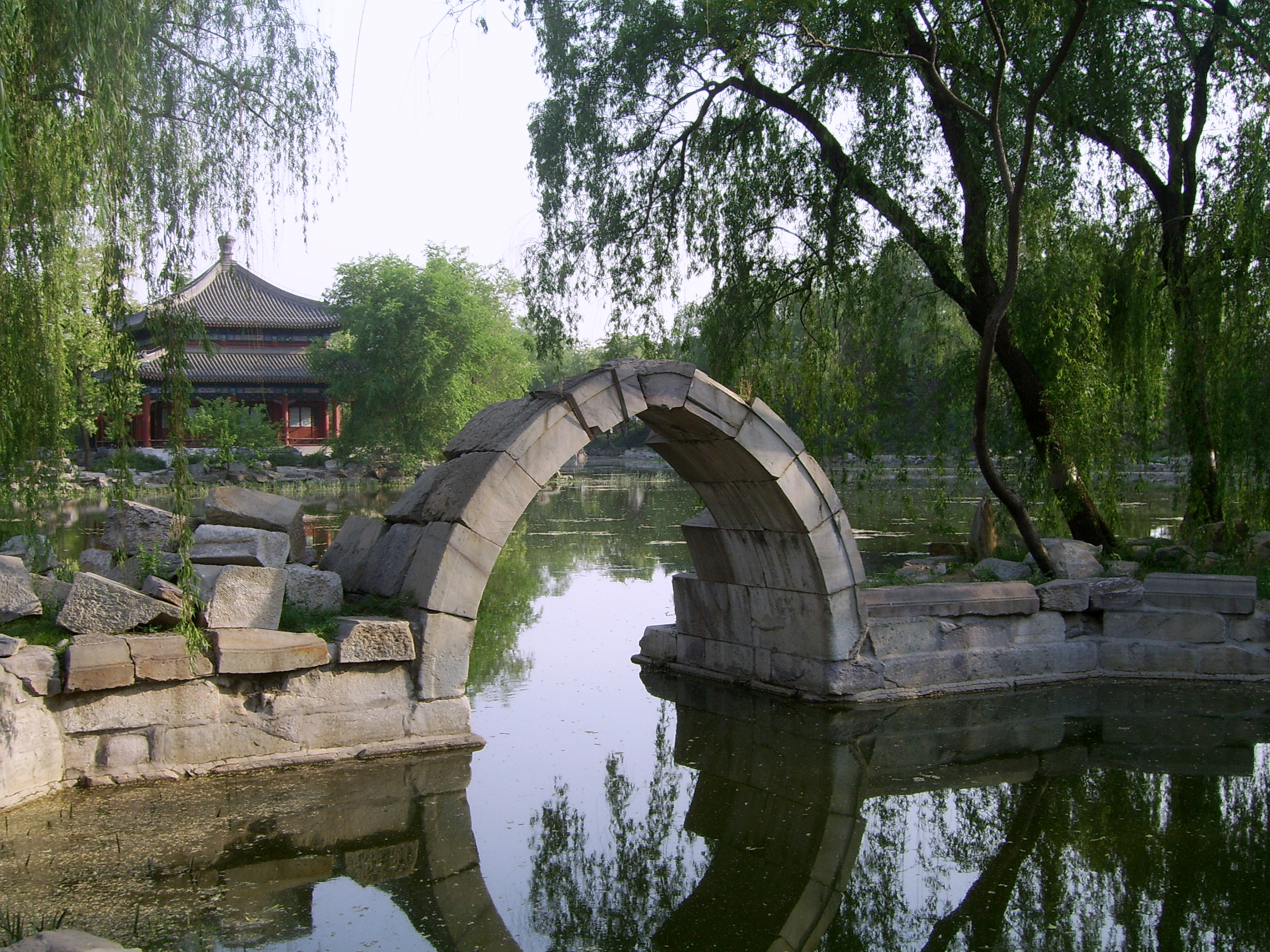
Remains of the Old Summer Palace garden

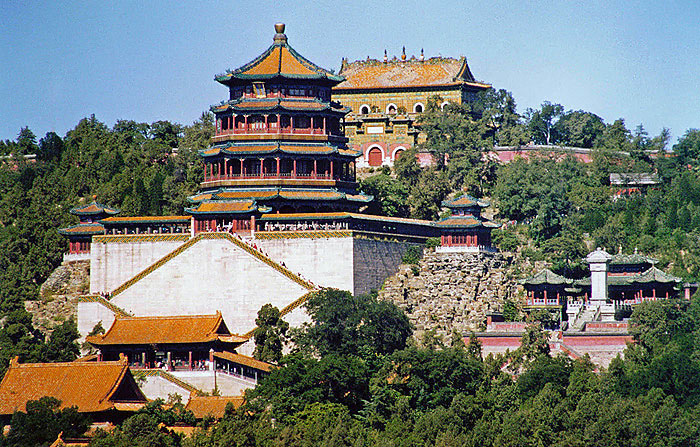
The Summer Palace in Beijing today

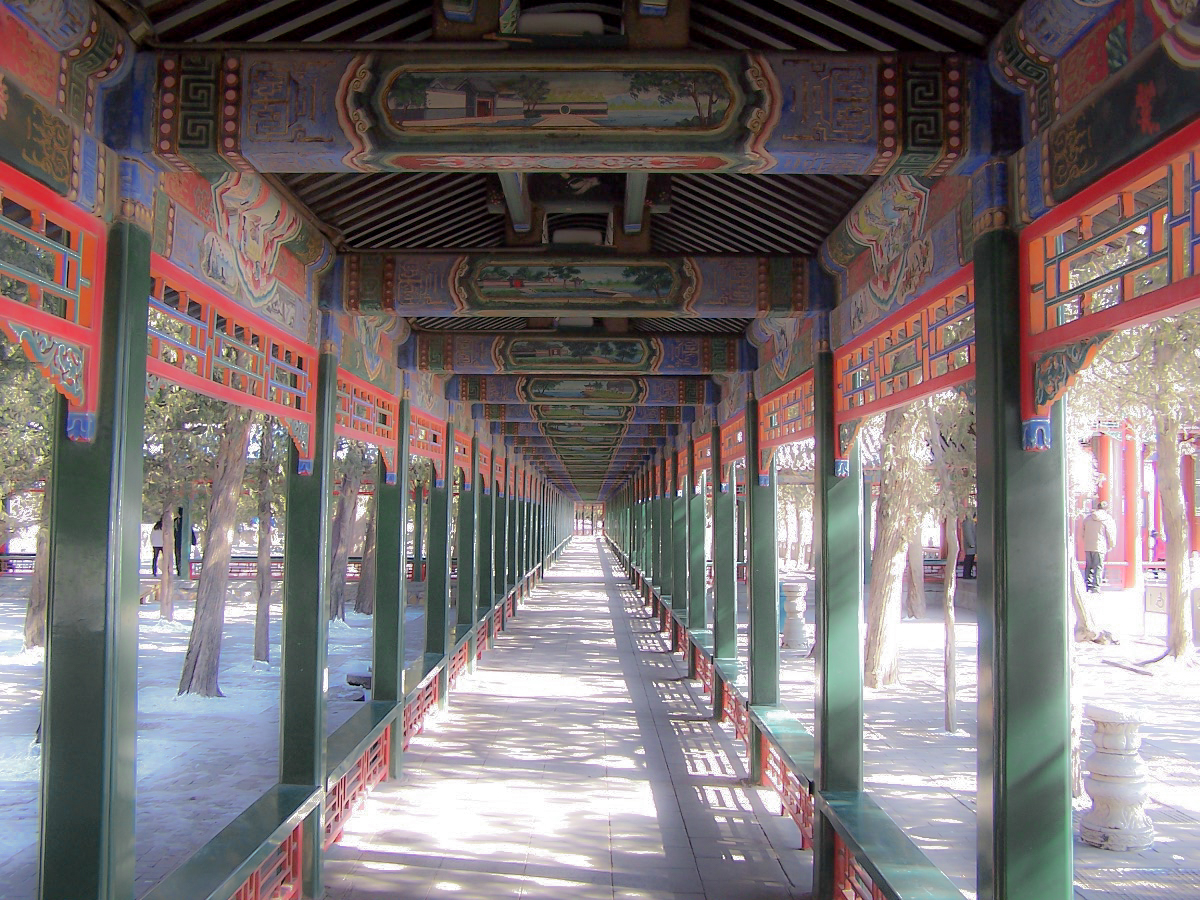
The Long Corridor at the Summer Palace (1750) is 728 meters long. It was built so the emperor could walk through the garden protected from the elements.

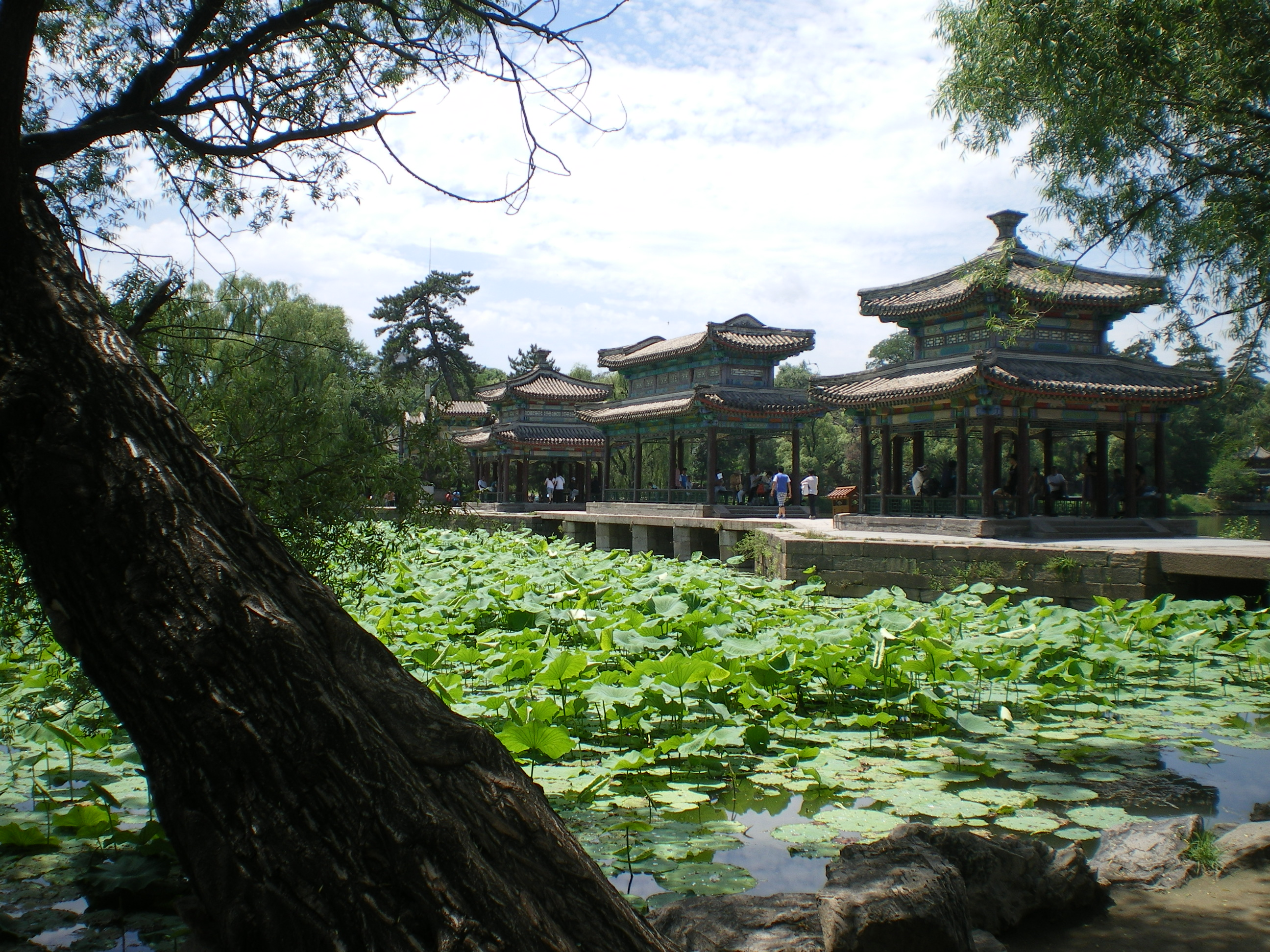
Gardens of the Chengde Mountain Resort, the imperial villa in the mountains (1703–1792).

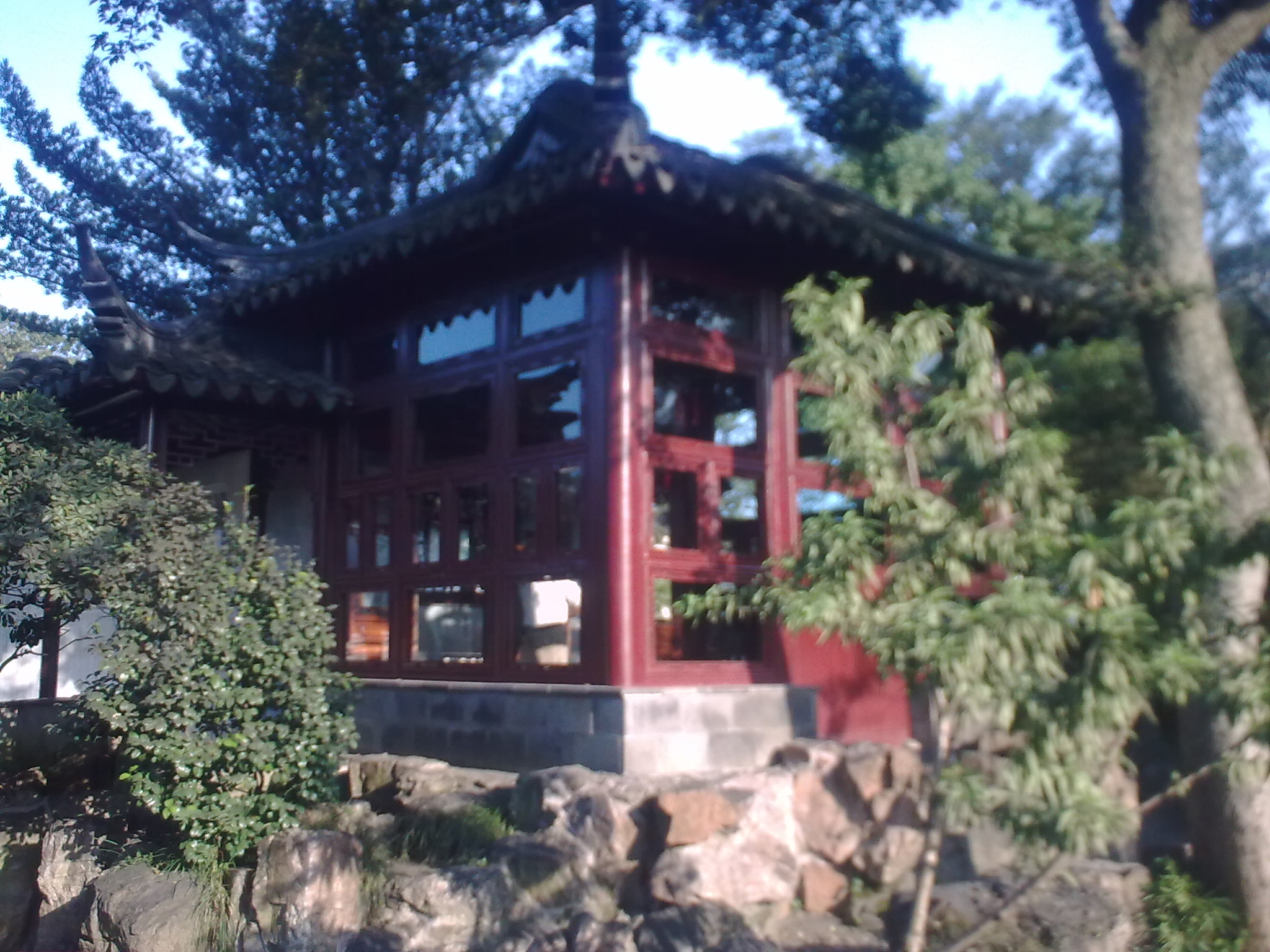
"My Loveable Pavilion" from the Couple's Retreat Garden (1723–1736)

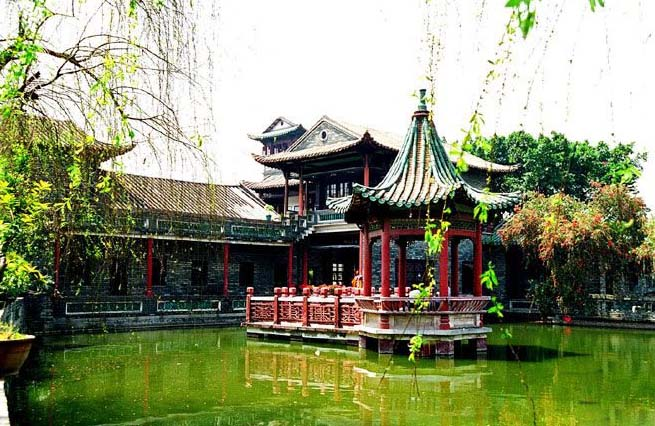
Keyuan garden in Guangdong Province, (1850)

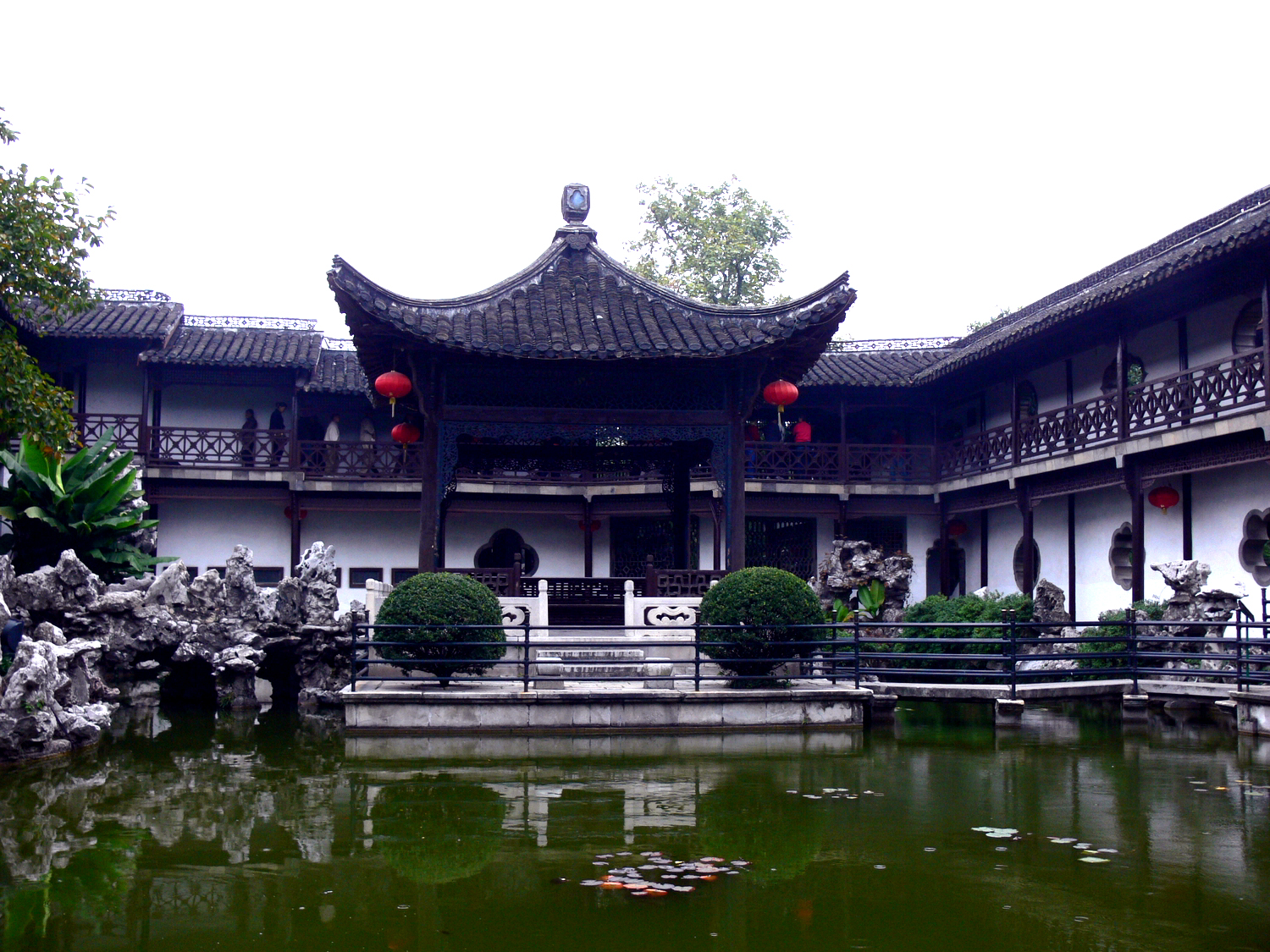
The He Garden in Yangzhou, Jiangsu Province, (1880), a classic private residence garden of the Qing dynasty.

== Design of the classical garden ==
A Chinese garden was not meant to be seen all at once; the plan of a classical Chinese garden presented the visitor with a series of perfectly composed and framed glimpses of scenery; a view of a pond, or of a rock, or a grove of bamboo, a blossoming tree, or a view of a distant mountain peak or a pagoda. The 16th-century Chinese writer and philosopher Ji Cheng instructed garden builders to "hide the vulgar and the common as far as the eye can see, and include the excellent and the splendid."

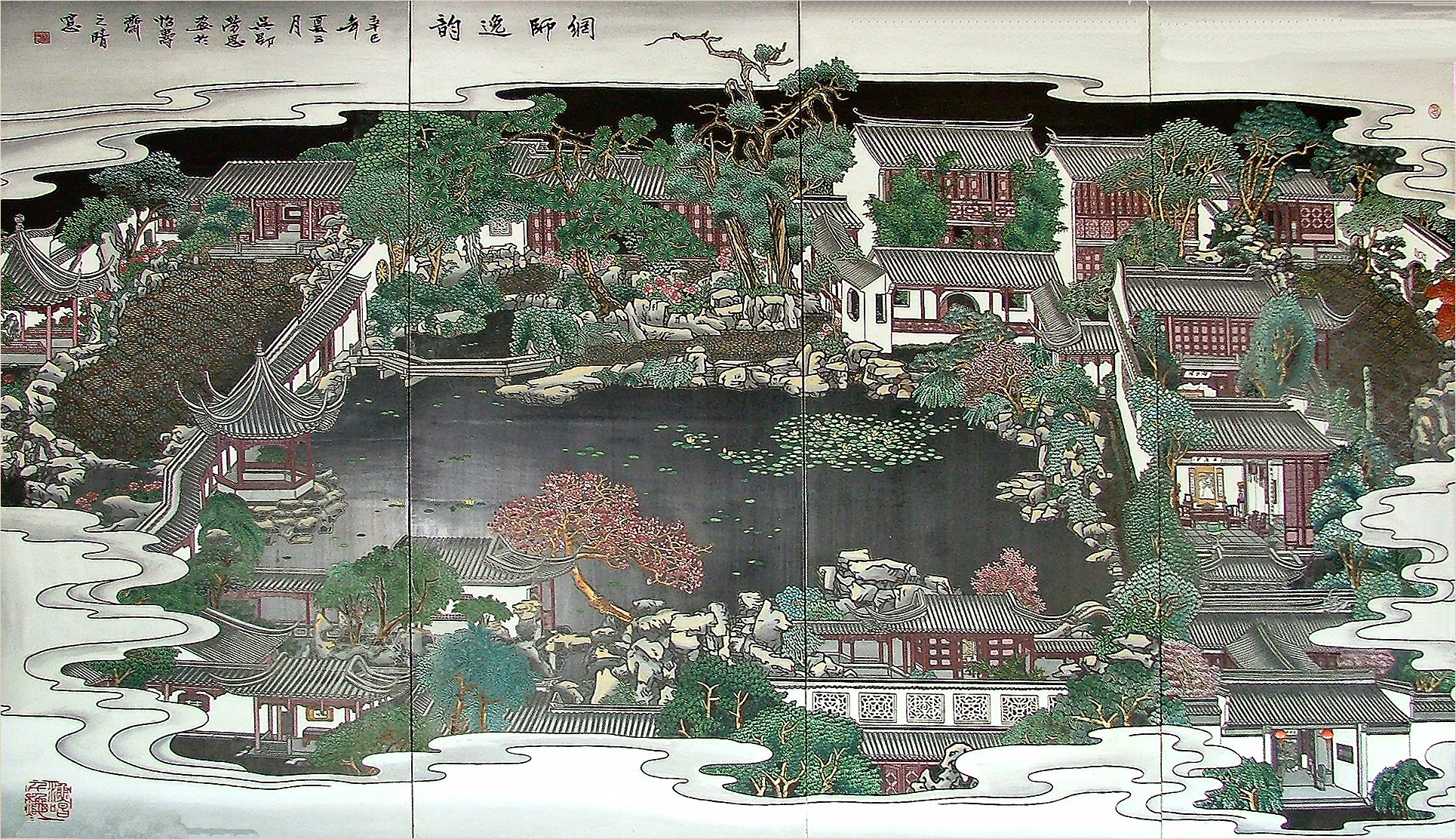
Painted map of the Master of the Nets Garden begun in 1140, renovated 1736–1796

Some early Western visitors to the imperial Chinese gardens felt they were chaotic, crowded with buildings in different styles, without any seeming order. But the Jesuit priest Jean Denis Attiret, who lived in China from 1739 and was a court painter for the Qianlong Emperor, observed there was a "beautiful disorder, an anti-symmetry" in the Chinese garden. "One admires the art with which this irregularity is carried out. Everything is in good taste, and so well arranged, that there is not a single view from which all the beauty can be seen; you have to see it piece by piece." This spatial irregularity often contrasts with the rigid axial layout of the adjoining residence. In Suzhou's Couple's Garden, the main hall, study, and reception rooms are aligned symmetrically along a north–south axis, while the adjacent garden breaks this order with winding paths, angled pavilions, and rockeries placed to obscure direct sight-lines, creating a sense of natural spontaneity and layered views.

Chinese classical gardens varied greatly in size. The largest garden in Suzhou, the Humble Administrator's Garden, was a little over ten hectares in area, with one fifth of the garden occupied by the pond. But they did not have to be large. Ji Cheng built a garden for Wu Youyu, the Treasurer of Jinling, that was just under one hectare in size, and the tour of the garden was only four hundred steps long from the entrance to the last viewing point, but Wu Youyu said it contained all the marvels of the province in a single place.

The classical garden was surrounded by a wall, usually painted white, which served as a pure backdrop for the flowers and trees. A pond of water was usually located in the center. Many structures, large and small, were arranged around the pond. In the garden described by Ji Cheng above, the structures occupied two-thirds of the hectare, while the garden itself occupied the other third. In a scholar garden the central building was usually a library or study, connected by galleries with other pavilions which served as observation points of the garden features. These structures also helped divide the garden into individual scenes or landscapes. The other essential elements of a scholar garden were plants, trees, and rocks, all carefully composed into small perfect landscapes. Scholar gardens also often used what was called "borrowed" scenery (借景 jiejing); where unexpected views of scenery outside the garden, such as mountain peaks, seemed to be an extension of the garden itself.

=== Architecture ===
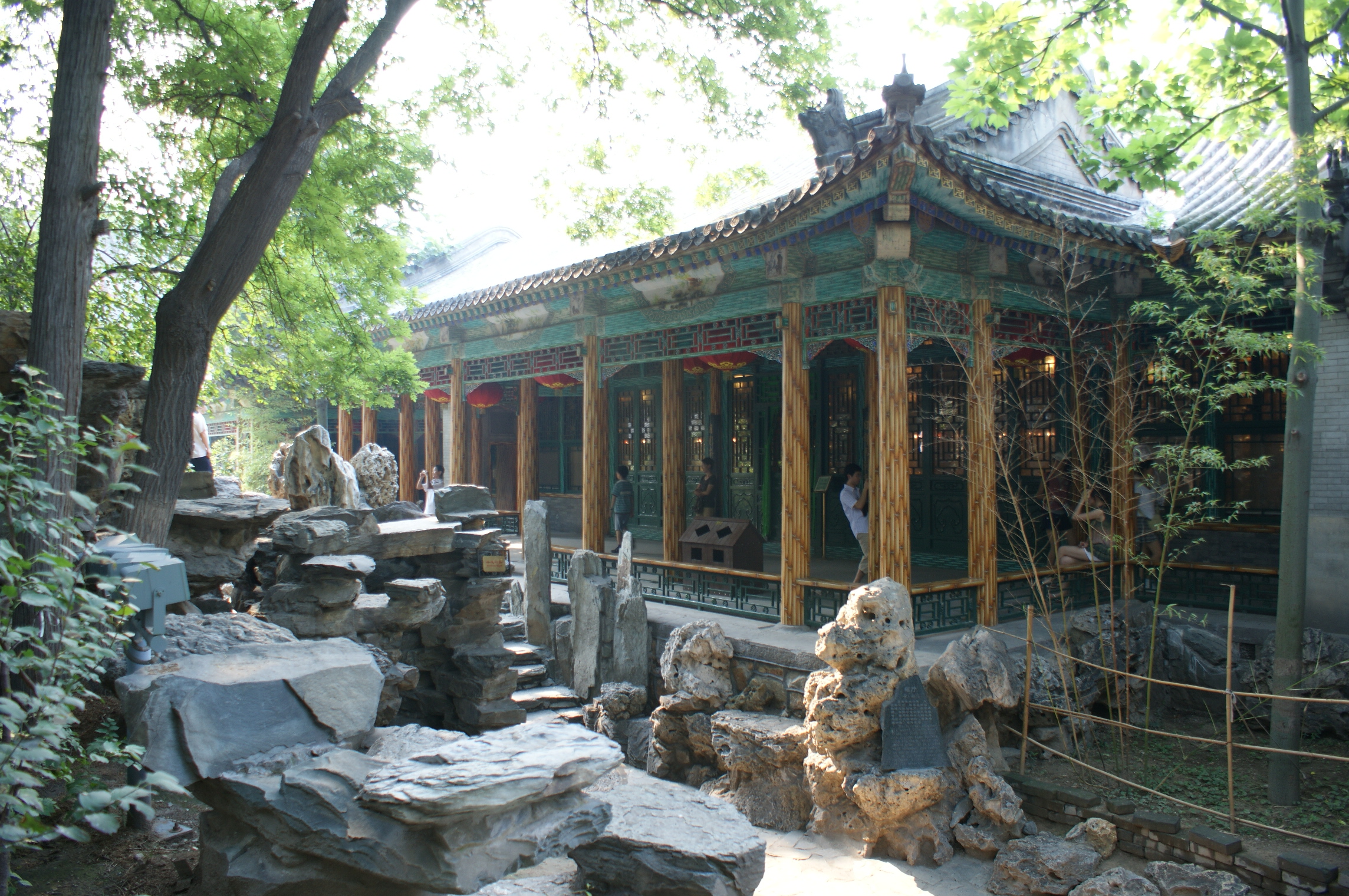
Pavilion for viewing the rock garden at the Prince Gong Mansion in Beijing (1777)

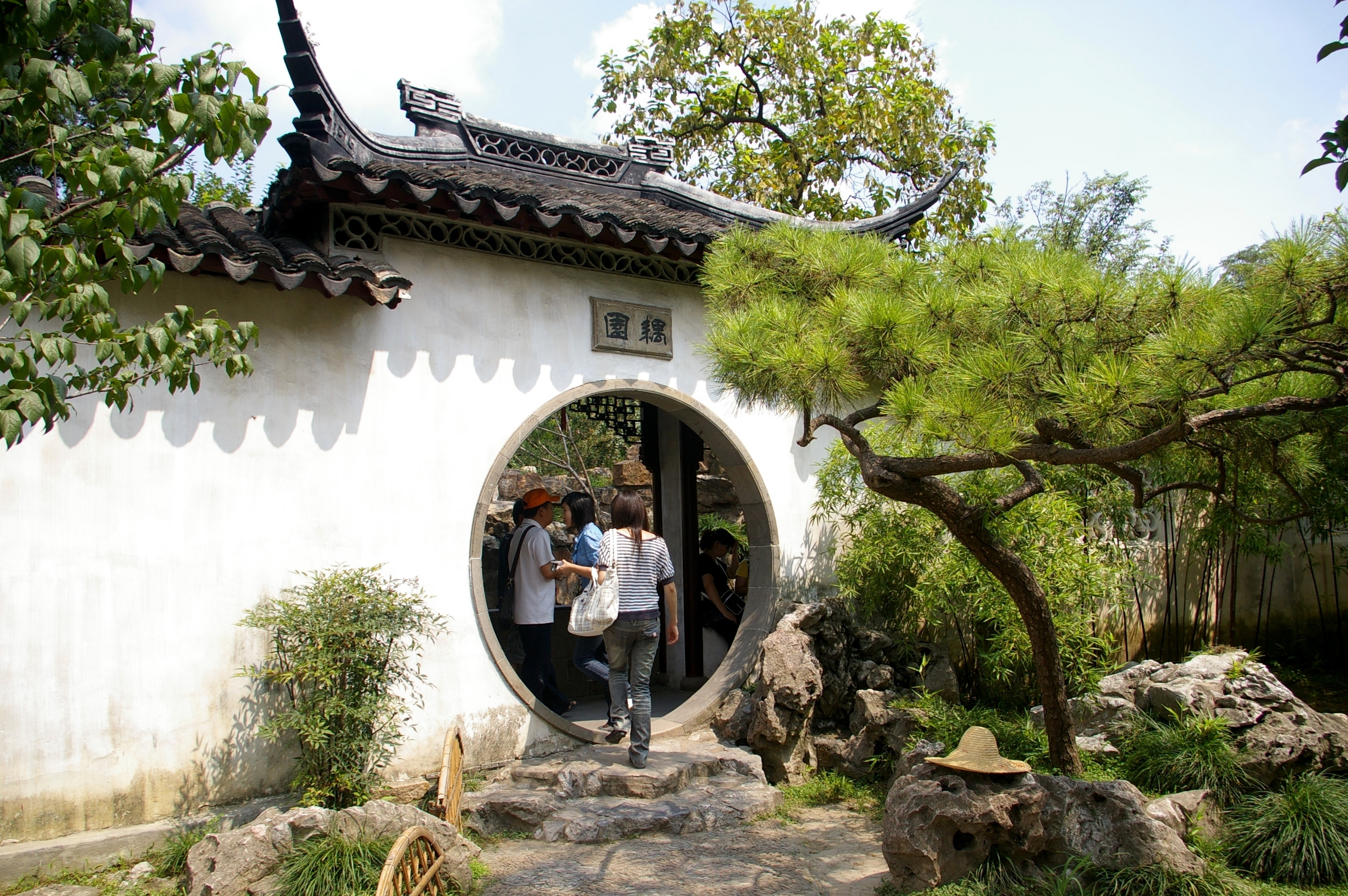
A moon gate from the Couple's Retreat Garden in Suzhou

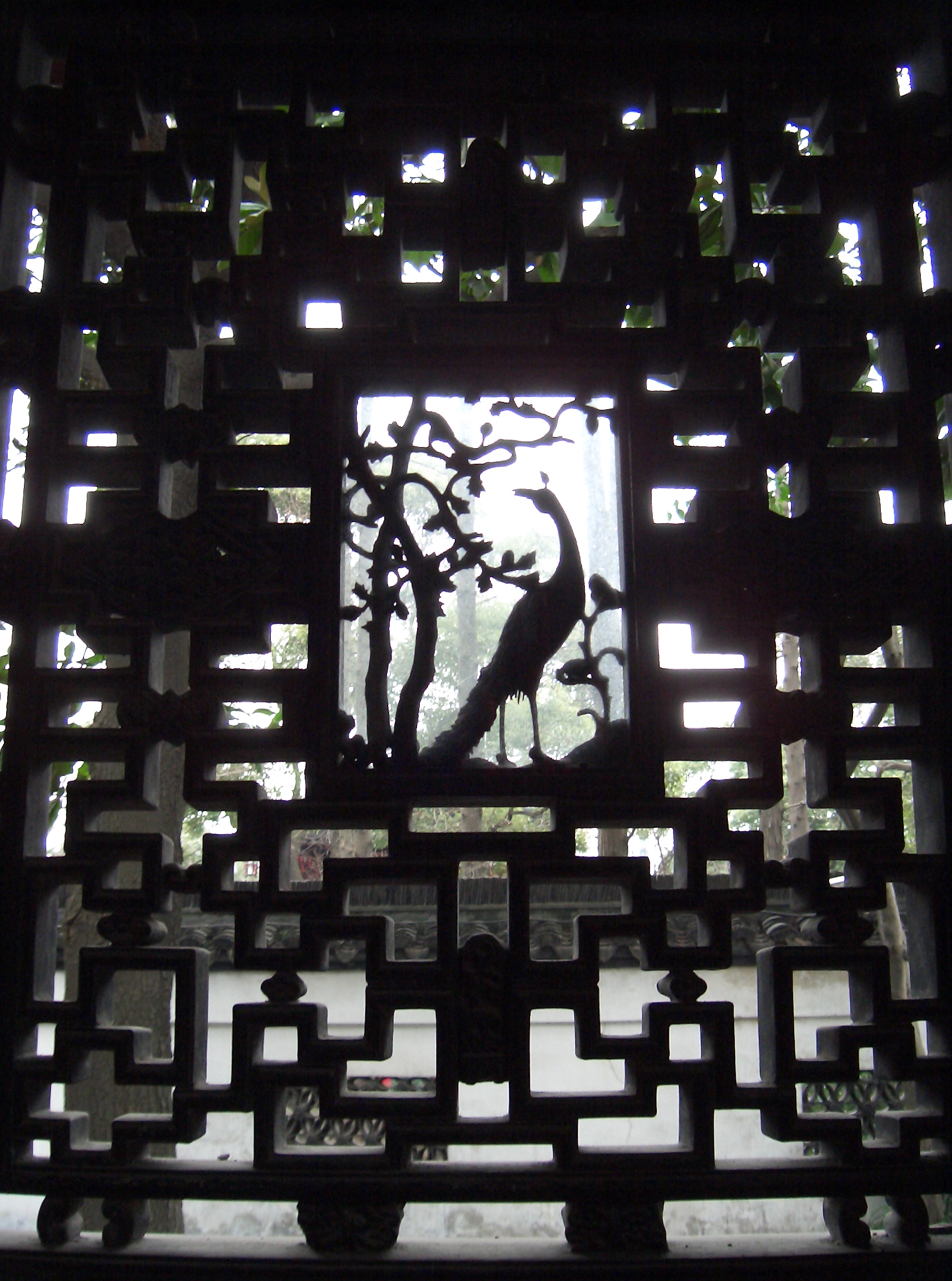
Ornamental window frame for garden-viewing in Yuyuan Garden, Shanghai

Chinese gardens are filled with architecture; halls, pavilions, temples, galleries, bridges, kiosks, and towers, occupying a large part of the space. The Humble Administrator's Garden in Suzhou has forty-eight structures, including a residence, several halls for family gatherings and entertainment, eighteen pavilions for viewing different features of the garden, and an assortment of towers, galleries, and bridges, all designed for seeing different parts of the gardens from different points of view. The garden structures are not designed to dominate the landscape, but to be in harmony with it.

Classical gardens traditionally have these structures:

- The ceremony hall (ting), or “room”. A building used for family celebrations or ceremonies, usually with an interior courtyard, not far from the entrance gate.
- The principal pavilion (da ting), or “large room”, for the reception of guests, for banquets and for celebrating holidays, such as New Years and the Festival of Lanterns. It often has a veranda around the building to provide cool and shade.
- The pavilion of flowers (hua ting), or “flower room”. Located near the residence, this building has a rear courtyard filled with flowers, plants, and a small rock garden.
- The pavilion facing the four directions (si mian ting), or “four doors room”. This building has folding or movable walls, for opening up a panoramic view of the garden.
- The lotus pavilion (he hua ting), or “lotus room”. Built next to a lotus pond, to see the flowers bloom and appreciate their aroma.
- The pavilion of mandarin ducks (yuan yang ting), or “mandarin ducks room”. This building is divided into two sections; one facing north used in summer, facing a lotus pond which provided cool air; and the southern part used in winter, with a courtyard planted with pine trees, which remained evergreen, and plum trees, whose blossoms announced the arrival of spring.

In addition to these larger halls and pavilions, the garden is filled with smaller pavilions, (also called ting), or “room”, which are designed for providing shelter from the sun or rain, for contemplating a scene, reciting a poem, taking advantage of a breeze, or simply resting. Pavilions might be located where the dawn can best be watched, where the moonlight shines on the water, where autumn foliage is best seen, where the rain can best be heard on the banana leaves, or where the wind whistles through the bamboo stalks. They are sometimes attached to the wall of another building or sometimes stood by themselves at view points of the garden, by a pond or at the top of a hill. They often are open on three sides.

The names of the pavilions in Chinese gardens express the view or experience they offer the visitor:

- The Peak-Worshipping Pavilion (The Lingering Garden) in Suzhou China
- The Hall of Distant Fragrances (Humble Administrator's Garden) in Suzhou China
- The Mountain View Tower (Humble Administrator's Garden) in Suzhou China
- Pavilion of the Moon and Wind (Master of the Nets Garden) in Suzhou China
- Pavilion in the Lotus Breeze (Humble Administrator's Garden) in Suzhou China
- Listening to the Rain Pavilion (Humble Administrator's Garden) in Suzhou China
- Watching the Pines and Appreciating Paintings Hall (Humble Administrator's Garden) in Suzhou China
- Spot of Return for Reading (Lingering Garden) in Suzhou China
- Between the Mountains and the Water Pavilion (The Couple's Retreat Garden) in Suzhou China
- Pavilion Leaning on the Jade (Humble Administrator's Garden) in Suzhou China
- Soft Rain Brings Coolness Terrace (Retreat & Reflection Garden) in Suzhou China
- Lasting Spring and Moon Viewing Tower (Retreat & Reflection Garden) in Suzhou China

Gardens also often feature two-story towers (lou or ge), usually at the edge of the garden, with a lower story made of stone and a whitewashed upper story, two-thirds the height of the ground floor, which provided a view from above of certain parts of the garden or the distant scenery.

Some gardens have a picturesque stone pavilion in the form of a boat, located in the pond. (called an xie, fang, or shifang). These generally had three parts; a kiosk with winged gables at the front, a more intimate hall in the center, and a two-story structure with a panoramic view of the pond at the rear.

- Courtyards (yuan). Gardens contain small enclosed court courtyards, offering quiet and solitude for meditation, painting, drinking tea, or playing on the cithare.

Galleries (lang) are narrow covered corridors which connect the buildings, protect the visitors from the rain and sun, and also help divide the garden into different sections. These galleries are rarely straight; they zigzag or are serpentine, following the wall of the garden, the edge of the pond, or climbing the hill of the rock garden. They have small windows, sometimes round or in odd geometric shapes, to give glimpses of the garden or scenery to those passing through.

Windows and doors are an important architectural feature of the Chinese garden. Sometimes they are round (moon windows or a moon gate) or oval, hexagonal or octagonal, or in the shape of a vase or a piece of fruit. Sometimes they have highly ornamental ceramic frames. The window may carefully frame a branch of a pine tree, or a plum tree in blossom, or another intimate garden scene.

Bridges are another common feature of the Chinese garden. Like the galleries, they are rarely straight, but zigzag (called the Nine-turn bridges) or arch over the ponds, suggesting the bridges of rural China, and providing view points of the garden. Bridges are often built from rough timber or stone-slab raised pathways. Some gardens have brightly painted or lacquered bridges, which give a lighthearted feeling to the garden.

Gardens also often include small, austere houses for solitude and meditation, sometimes in the form of rustic fishing huts, and isolated buildings which serve as libraries or studios (shufang).

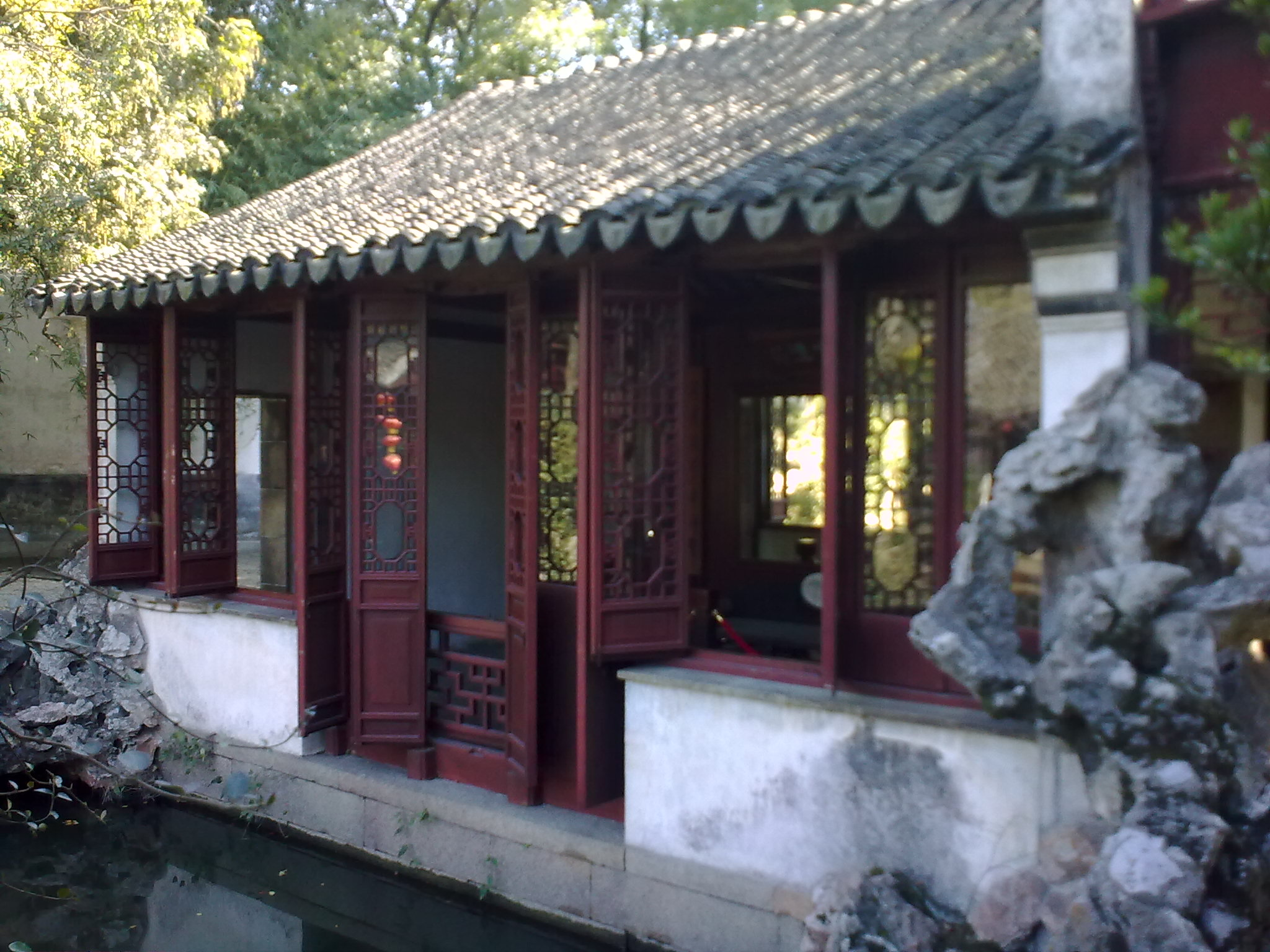
A three bay hall with full gable roofline and flat eves in the Retreat & Reflection Garden (1885)

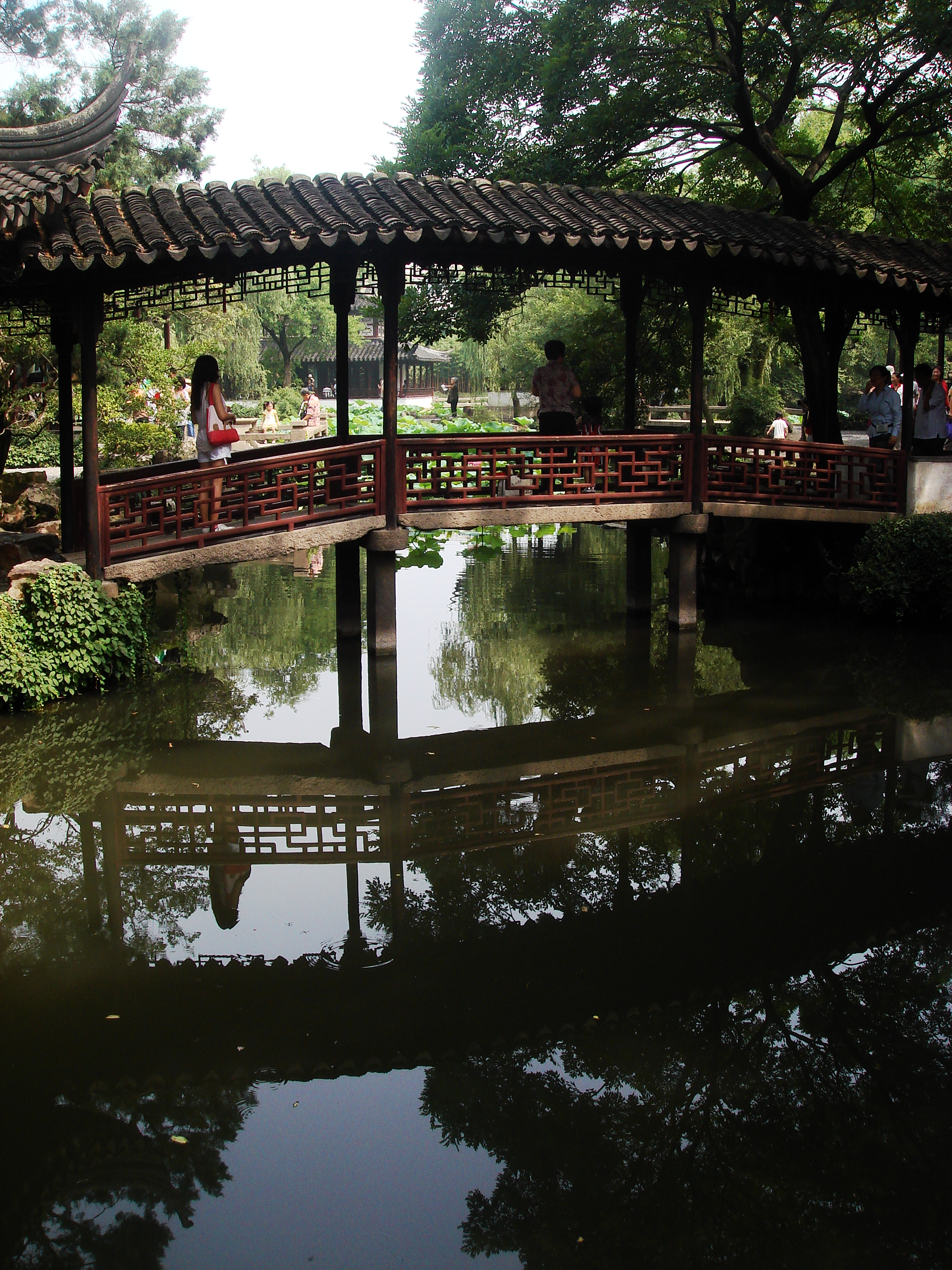
The Flying Rainbow Bridge in the Humble Administrator's Garden. It was designed to create a rainbow-shaped reflection in the pond.

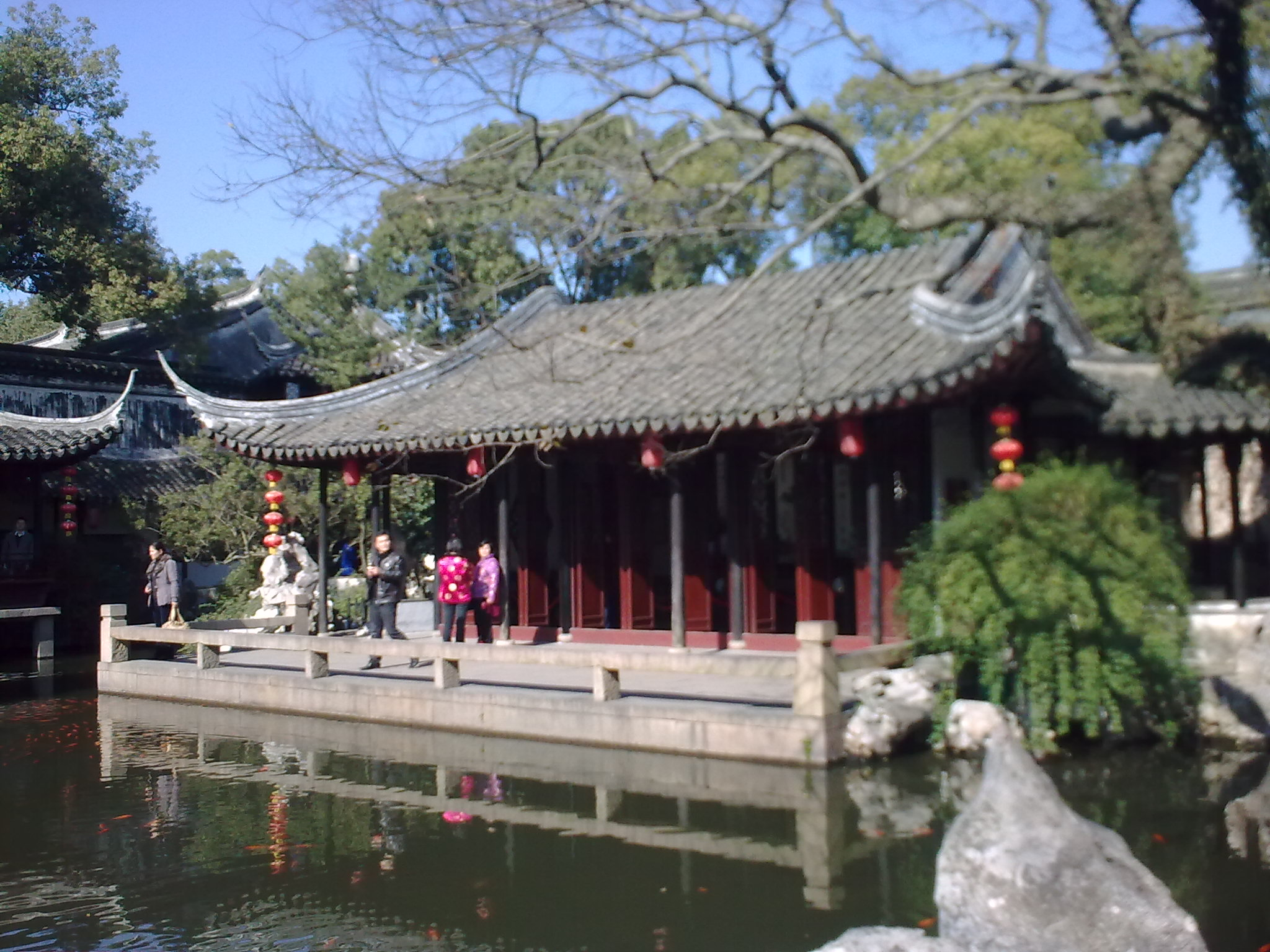
The Main Hall of the Retreat & Reflection Garden

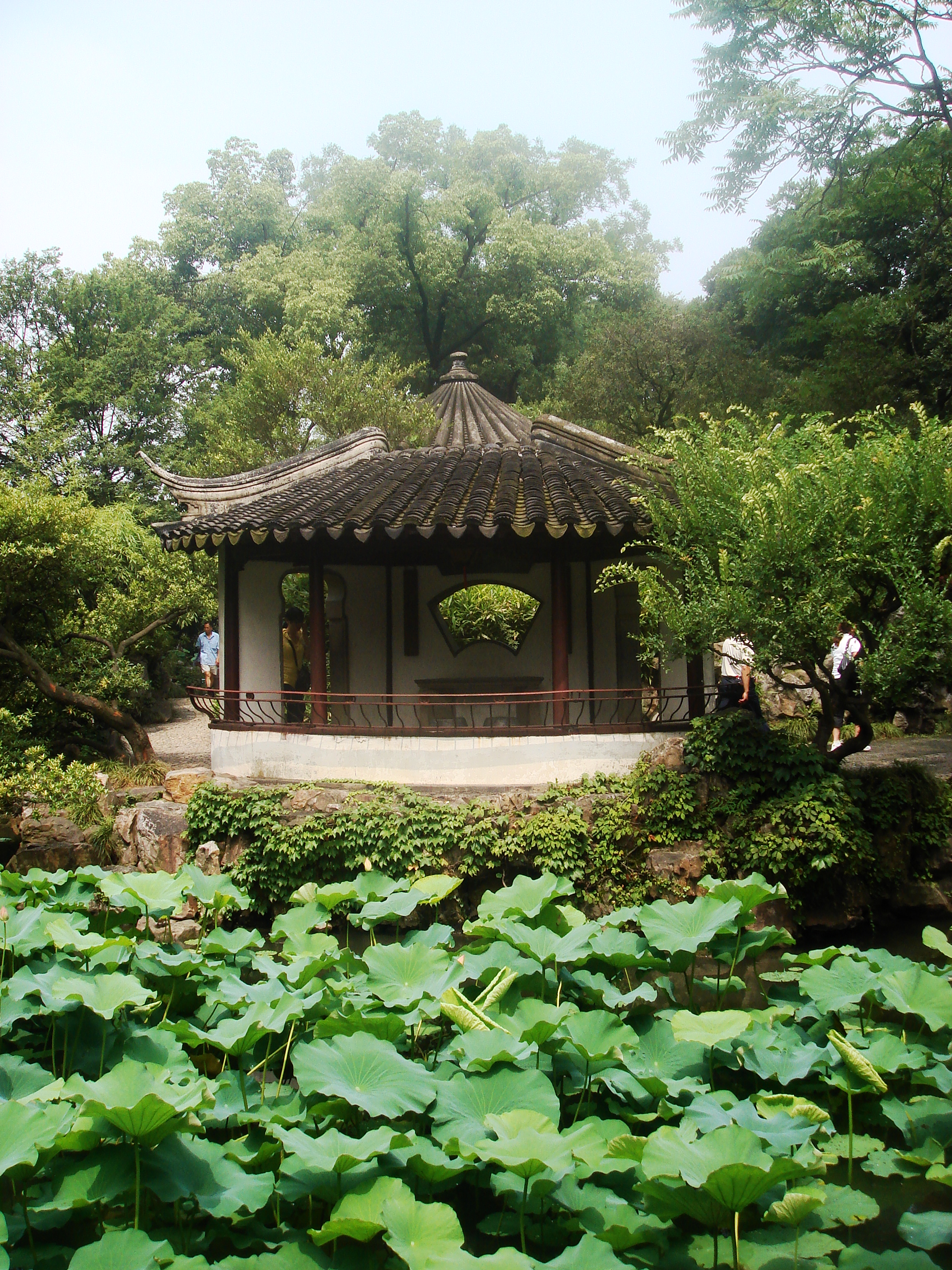
A pavilion with a fan-shaped viewing window in the pond of the Humble Administrator's Garden in Suzhou

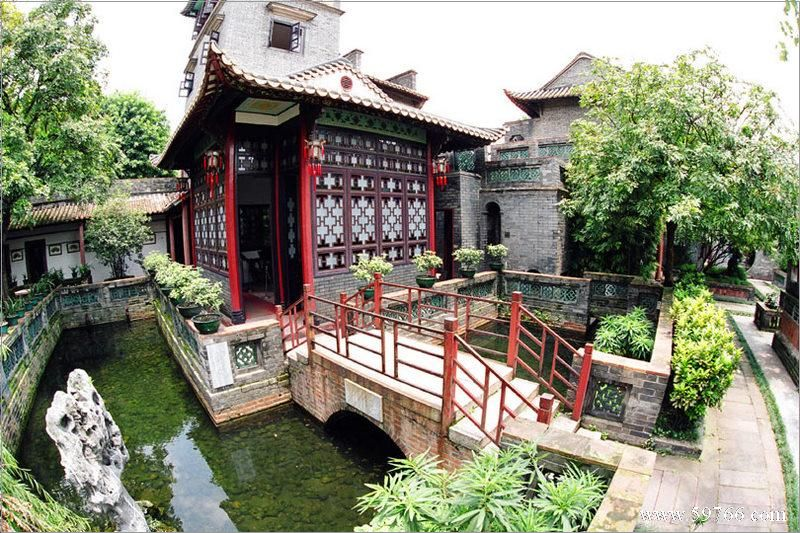
A pavilion in Keyuan Garden

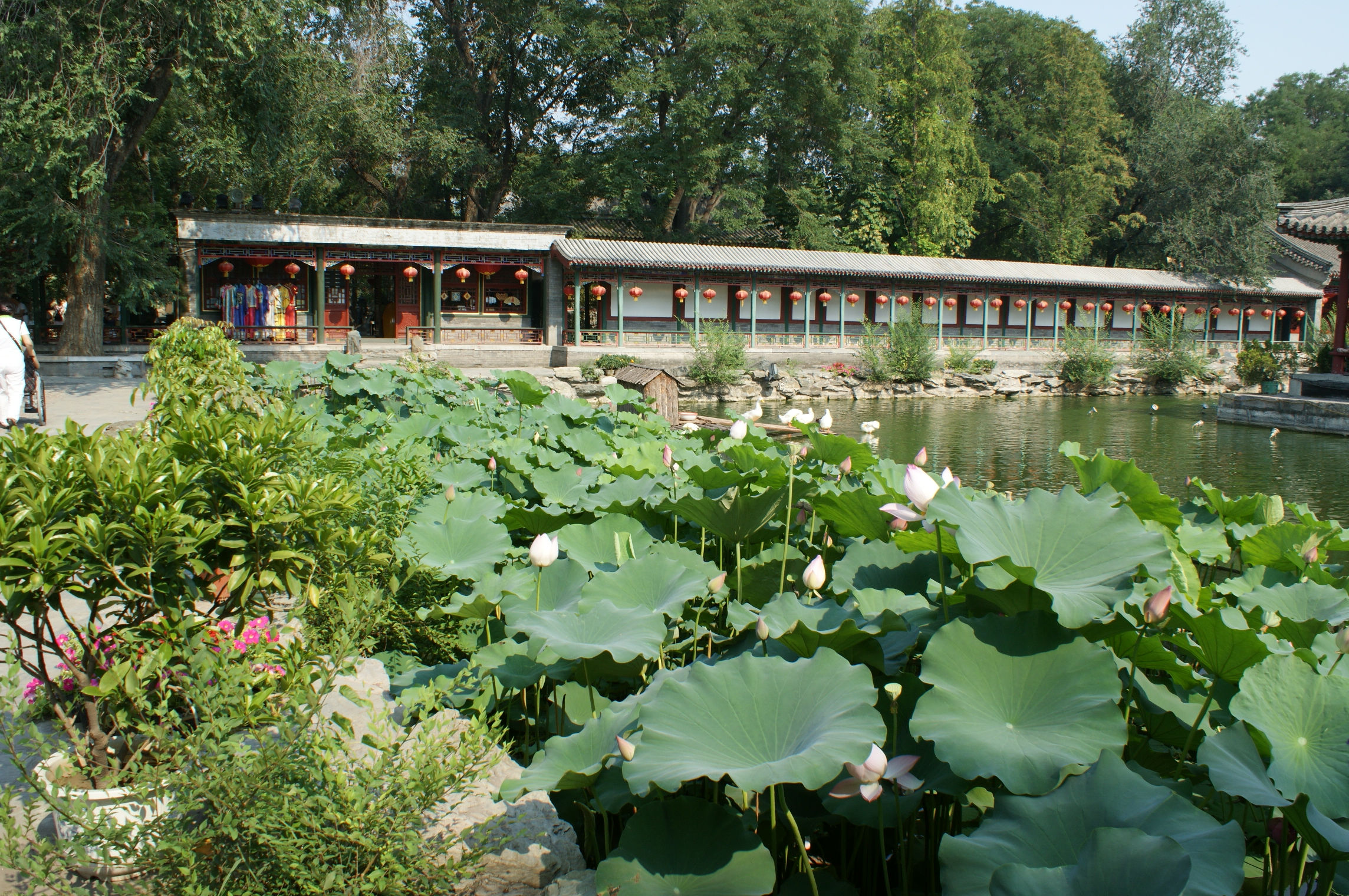
Long gallery for viewing the lotus pond at the Prince Gong Mansion in Beijing

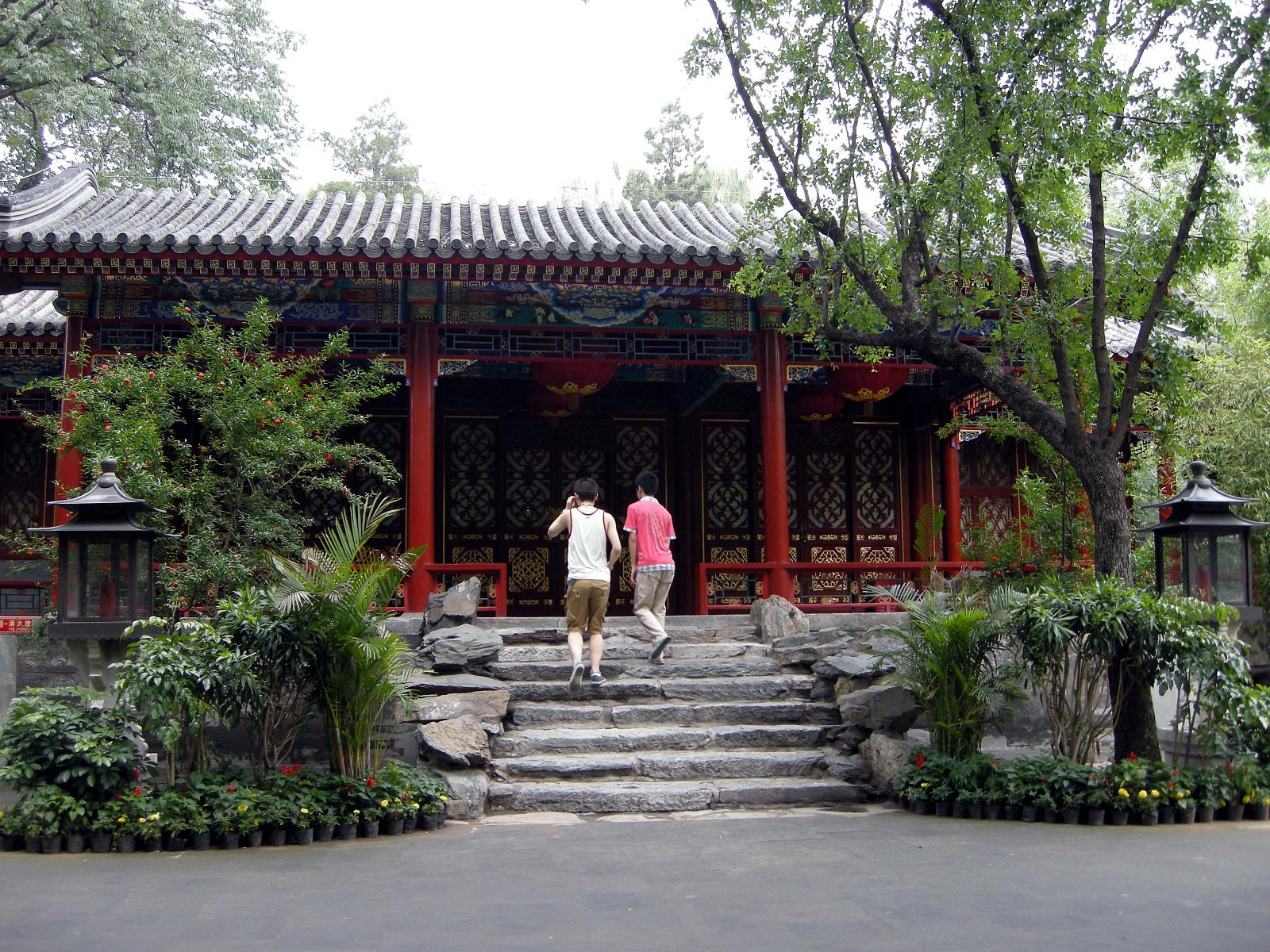
Garden gate of the Prince Gong Mansion in Beijing

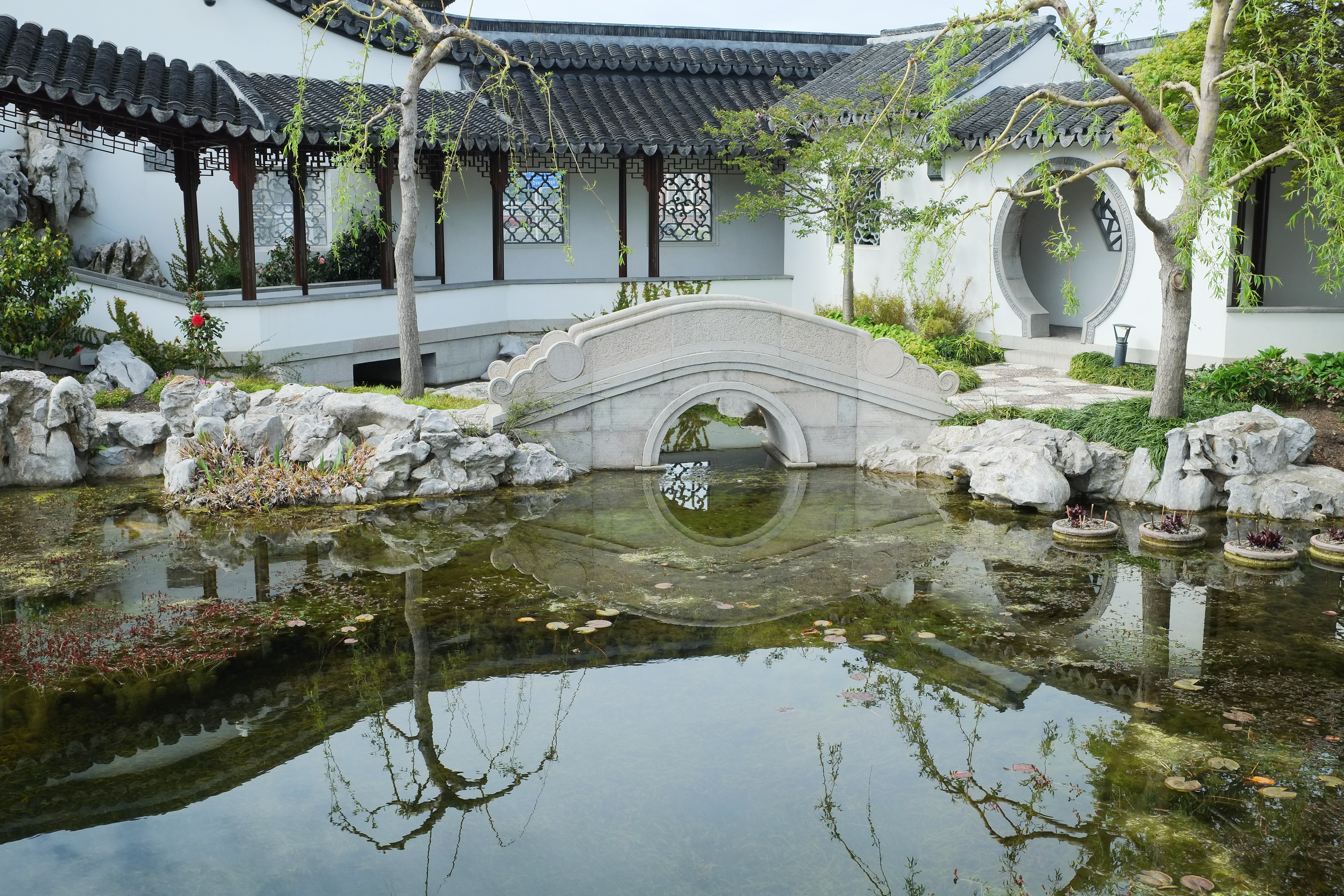
Moon bridge in Dunedin Chinese Garden

=== Artificial mountains and rock gardens ===
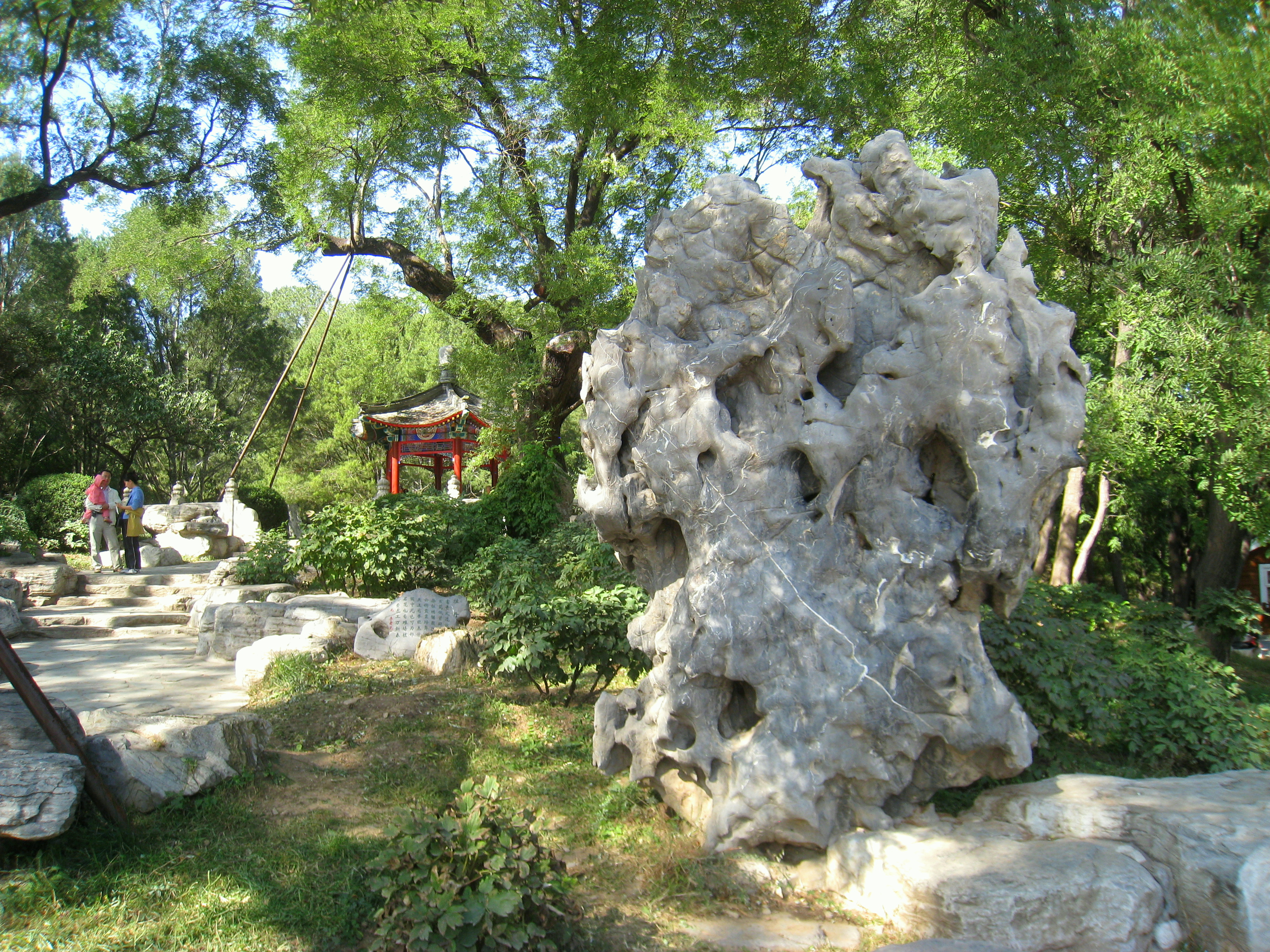
A scholar rock from Lake Tai in the Beijing Botanical Garden

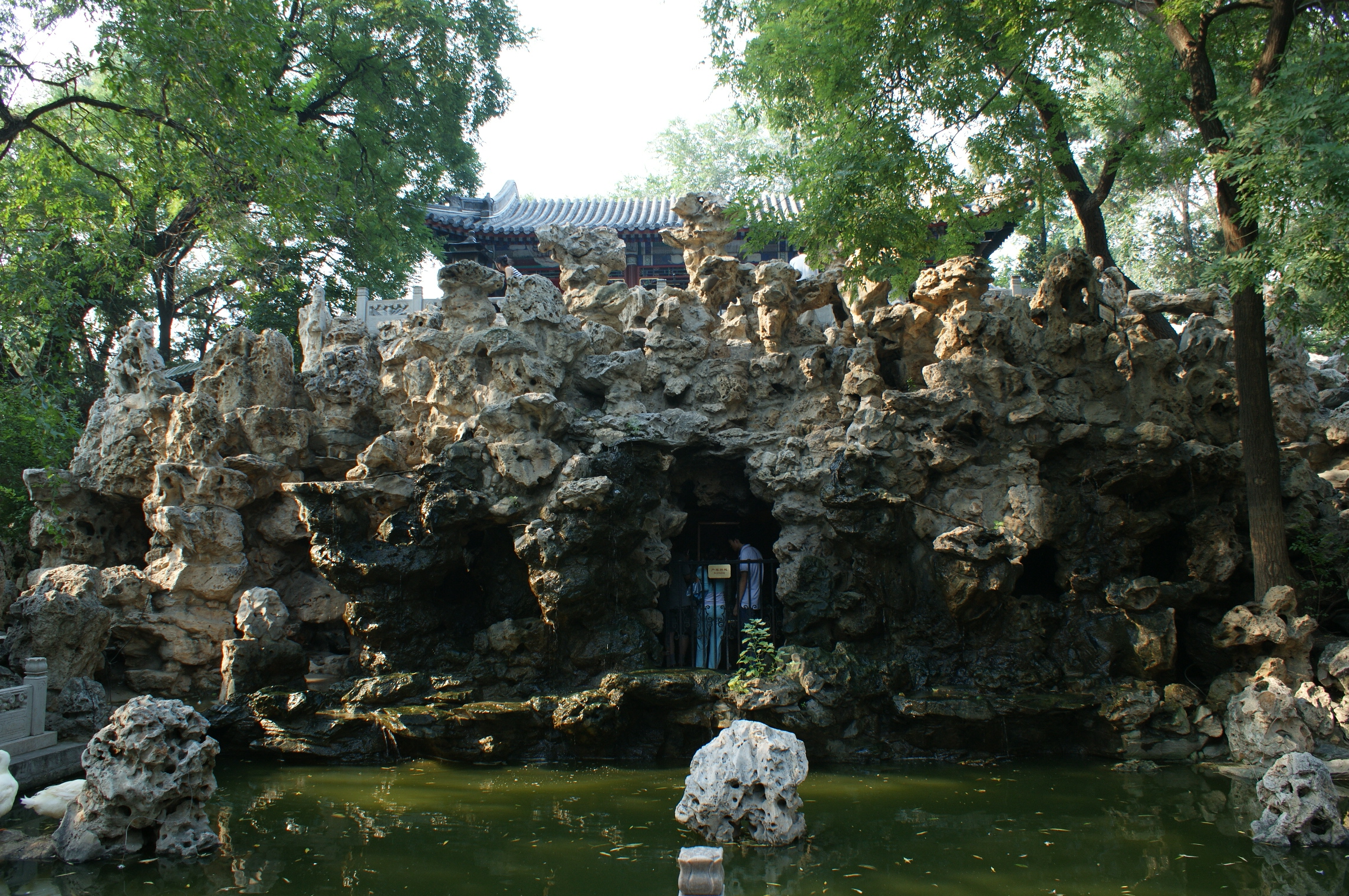
Rock garden at the Prince Gong Mansion in Beijing, complete with a grotto

The artificial mountain (jiashan) or rock garden is an integral element of Chinese classical gardens. The mountain peak was a symbol of virtue, stability and endurance in Confucian philosophy and in the I Ching. A mountain peak on an island was also a central part of the legend of the Isles of the Immortals, and thus became a central element in many classical gardens.

The first rock garden appeared in Chinese garden history in Tu Yuan (literally "Rabbit Garden"), built during the Western Han dynasty (206 BCE – 9 CE). During the Tang dynasty, the rock was elevated to the status of an art object, judged by its form (xing), substance (zhi), color (se), and texture (wen), as well as by its softness, transparency, and other factors. The poet Bo Juyi (772–846) wrote a catalog of the famous rocks of Lake Tai, called Taihu Shiji. These rocks, of limestone sculpted by erosion, became the most highly prized for gardens.

During the Song dynasty, the artificial mountains were made mostly of earth. But Emperor Huizong (1100–1125) nearly ruined the economy of the Song Empire by destroying the bridges of the Grand Canal so he could carry huge rocks by barge to his imperial garden. During the Ming dynasty, the use of piles of rocks to create artificial mountains and grottos reached its peak. During the Qing dynasty, the Ming rock gardens were considered too artificial and the new mountains were composed of both rocks and earth.

The artificial mountain in Chinese gardens today usually has a small view pavilion at the summit. In smaller classical gardens, a single scholar rock represents a mountain, or a row of rocks represents a mountain range.

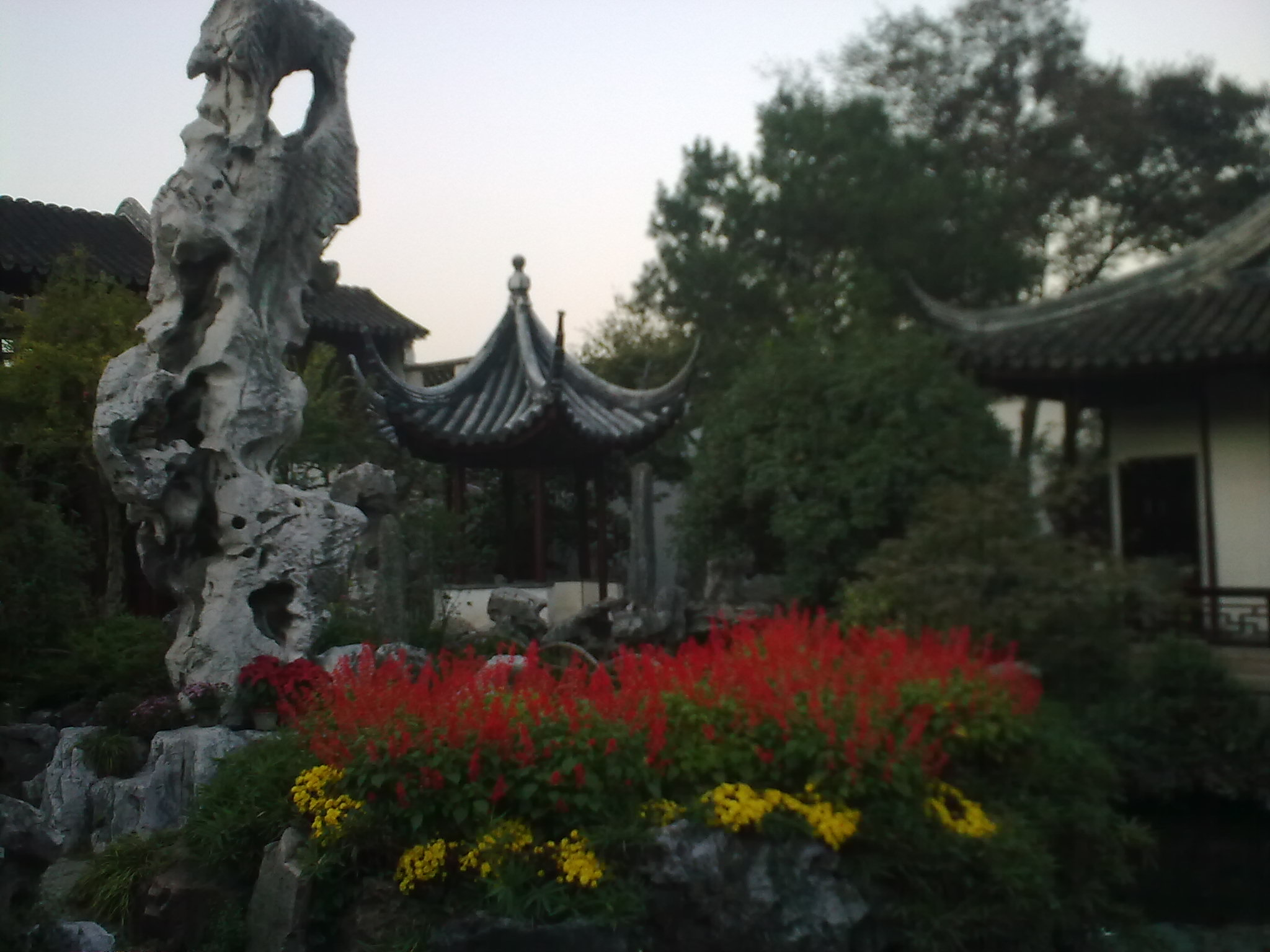
The Auspicious Cloud Capped Peak, a scholar stone in the Lingering Garden in Suzhou

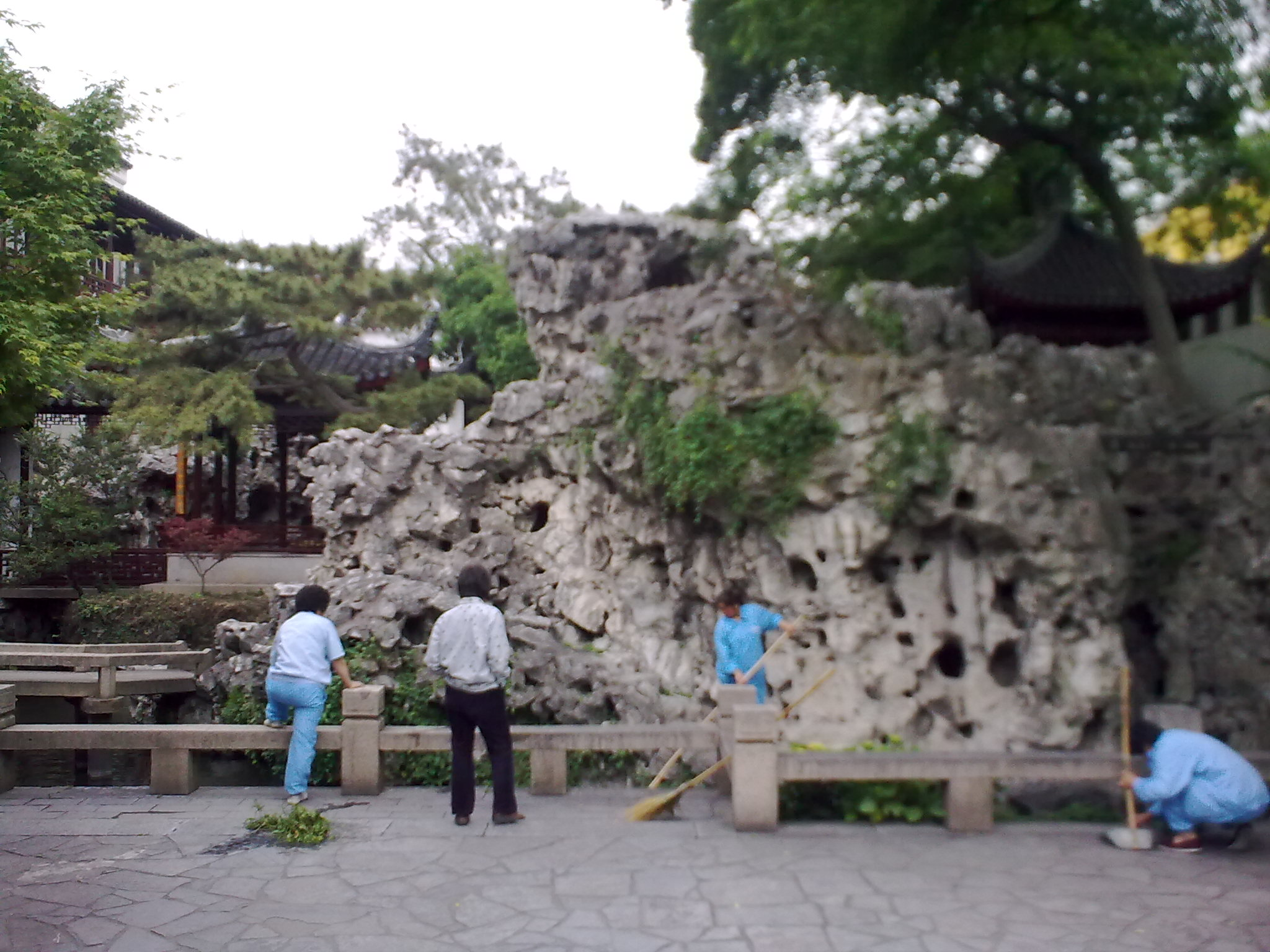
Rock garden of the Mountain Villa with Embracing Beauty

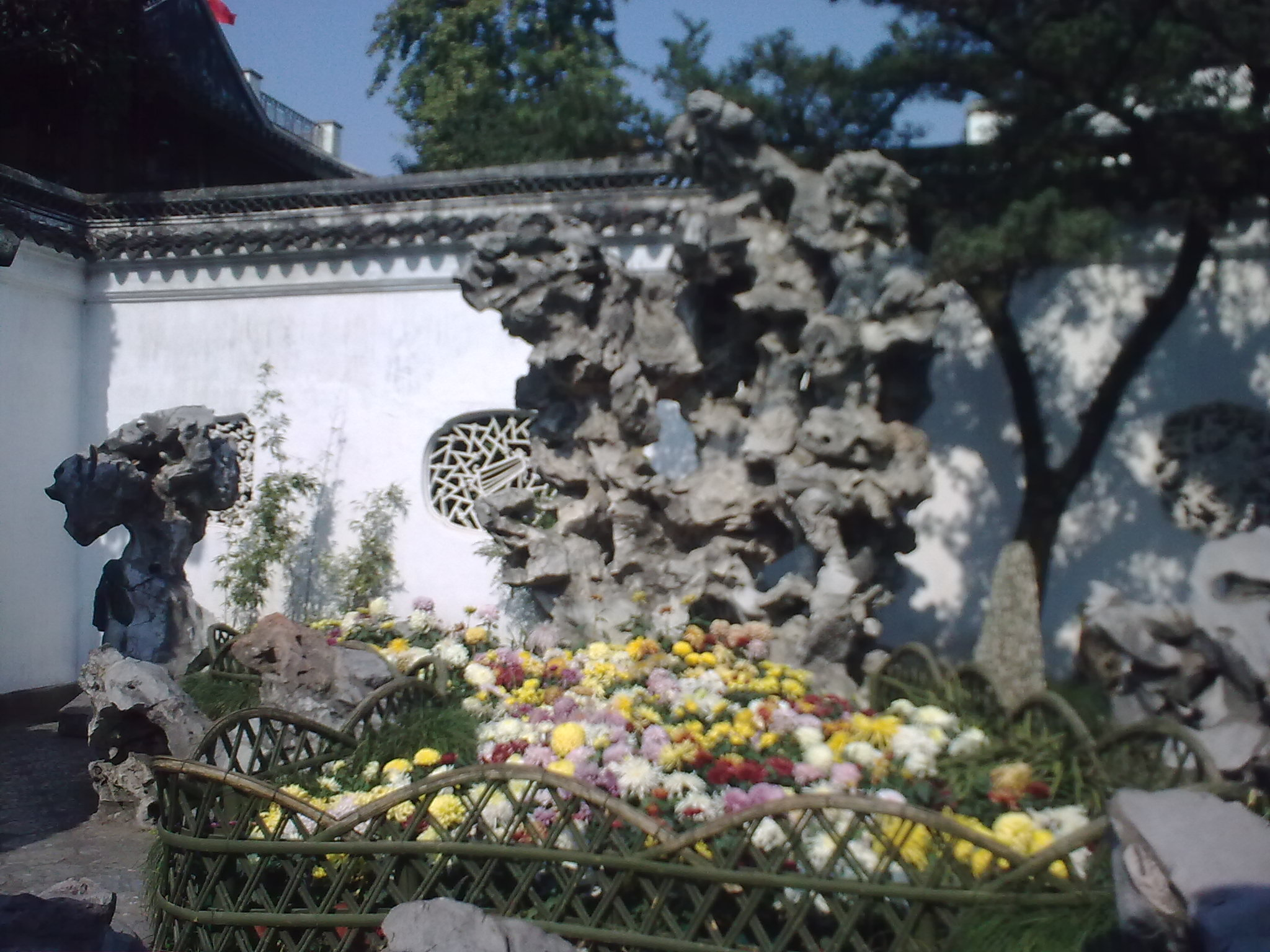
Nine Lion Peak, from the Lion Grove Garden

=== Water ===
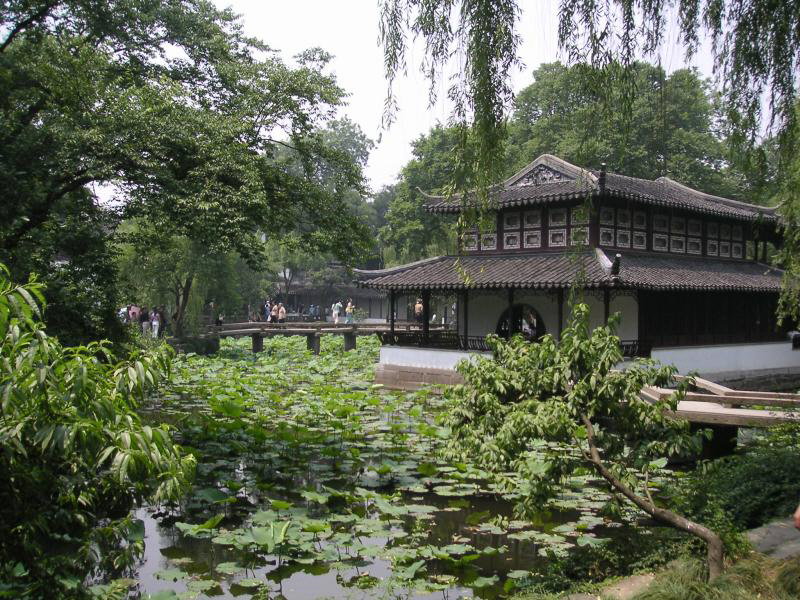
A pond or lake is the central element of a Chinese garden. Here is the pond of the Humble Administrator's Garden.

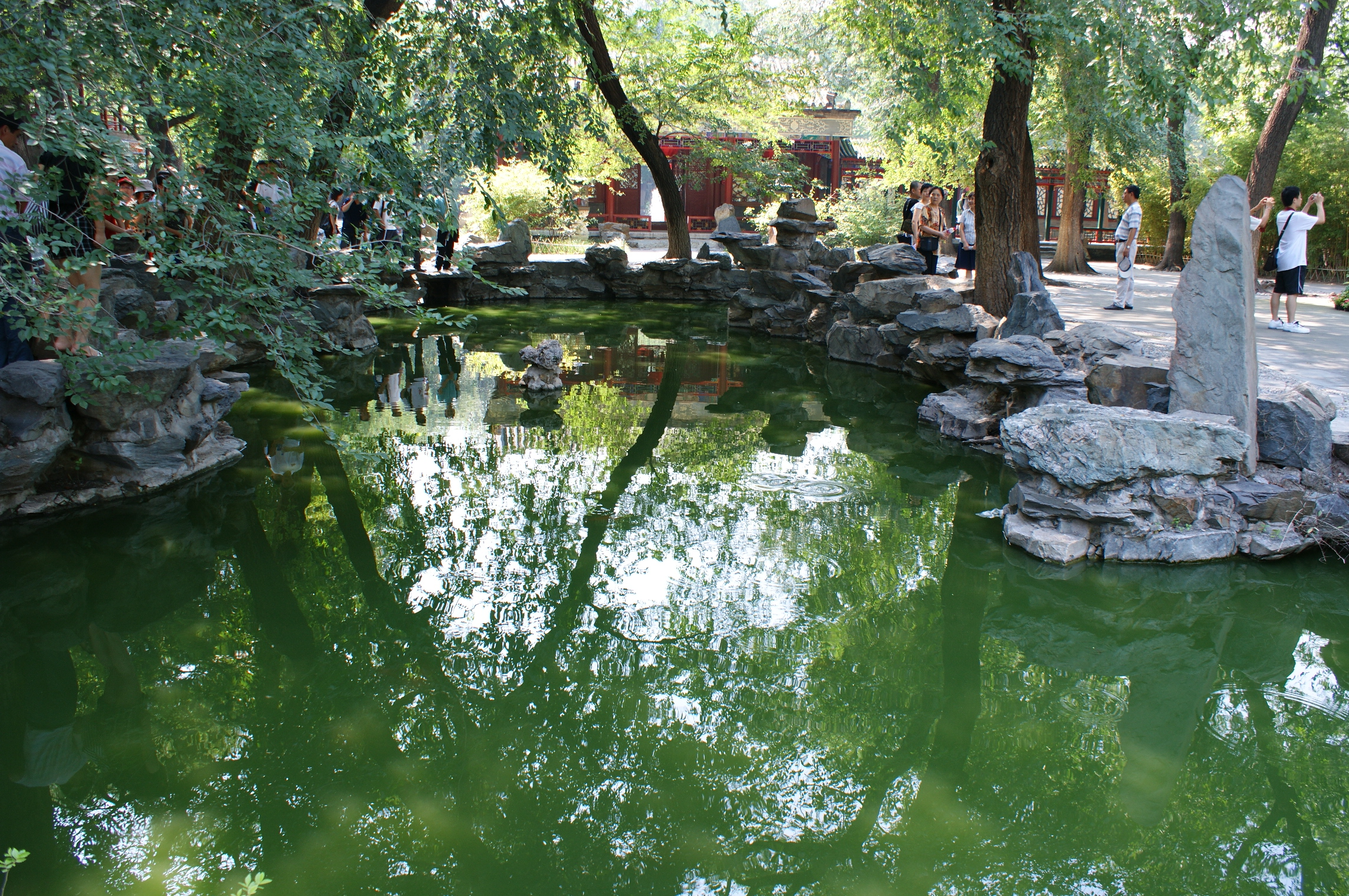
Pond at the Prince Gong Mansion, Beijing

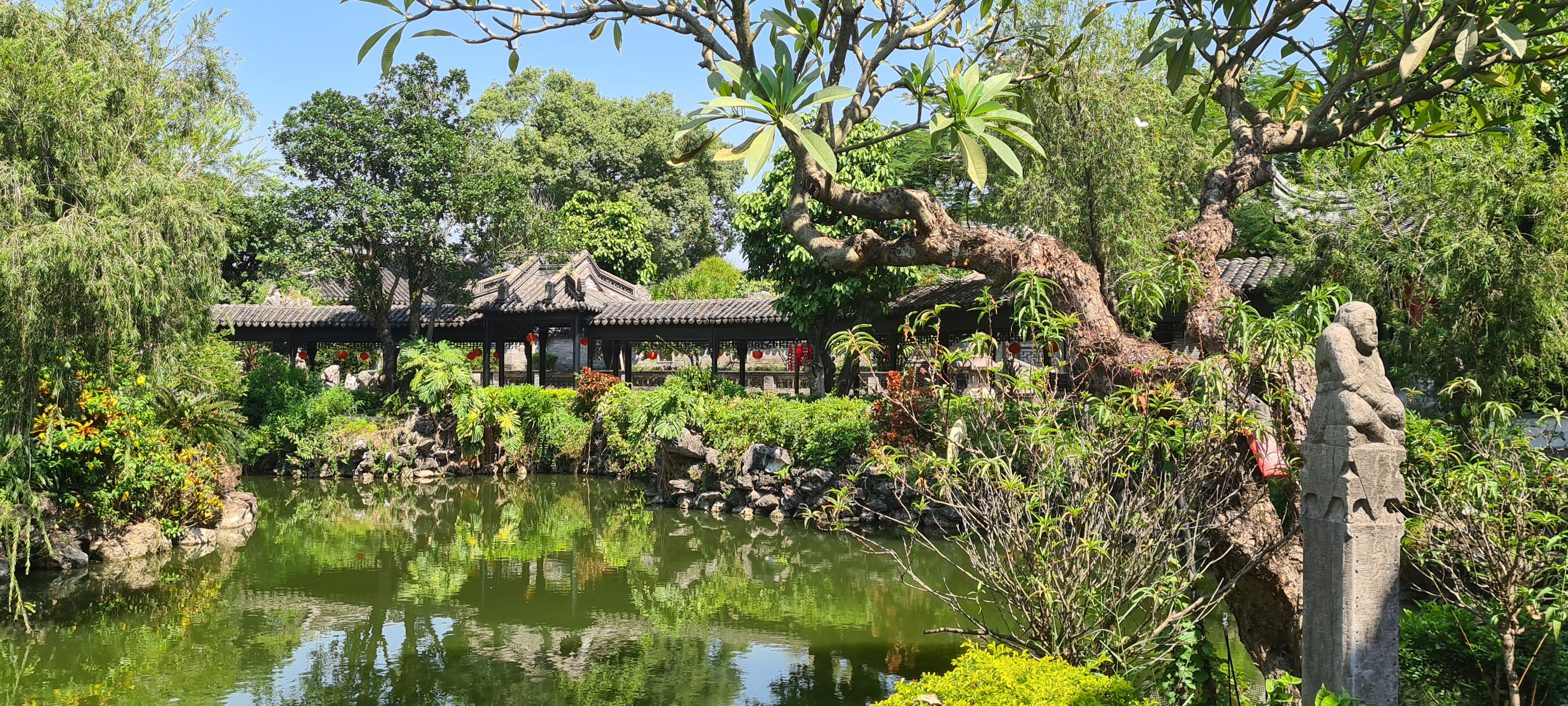
Water view at Zhan Yuan, Zhongshan

A pond or lake is the central element of a Chinese garden. The main buildings are usually placed beside it, and pavilions surround the lake to see it from different points of view. The garden usually has a pond for lotus flowers, with a special pavilion for viewing them. There are usually goldfish in the pond, with pavilions over the water for viewing them.

The lake or pond has an important symbolic role in the garden. In the I Ching, water represents lightness and communication, and carried the food of life on its journey through the valleys and plains. It also is the complement to the mountain, the other central element of the garden, and represents dreams and the infinity of spaces. The shape of the garden pond often hides the edges of the pond from viewers on the other side, giving the illusion that the pond goes on to infinity. The softness of the water contrasts with the solidity of the rocks. The water reflects the sky, and therefore is constantly changing, but even a gentle wind can soften or erase the reflections.

The lakes and waterside pavilions in Chinese gardens were also influenced by another classic of Chinese literature, the Shishuo Xinyu by Liu Yiqing (403–444), who described the promenades of the Emperor Jianwen of Jin along the banks of the Hao and the Pu River, in the Garden of the Splendid Forest (Hualin yuan). Many gardens, particularly in the gardens of Jiangnan and the imperial gardens of northern China, have features and names taken from this work.

Small gardens have a single lake, with a rock garden, plants and structures around its edge. Middle-sized gardens will have a single lake with one or more streams coming into the lake, with bridges crossing the streams, or a single long lake divided into two bodies of water by a narrow channel crossed by a bridge. In a very large garden like the Humble Administrator's Garden, the principal feature of the garden is the large lake with its symbolic islands, symbolizing the isles of the immortals. Streams come into the lake, forming additional scenes. Numerous structures give different views of the water, including a stone boat, a covered bridge, and several pavilions by the side of or over the water.

The streams in the Chinese garden always follow a winding course, and are hidden from time to time by rocks or vegetation. A French Jesuit missionary, Father Attiret, who was a painter in the service of the Qianlong Emperor from 1738 to 1768, described one garden he saw:

"The canals are not like those in our country bordered with finely cut stone, but very rustic and lined with pieces or rock, some coming forward, some retreating. which are placed so artistically that you would think it was a work of nature."

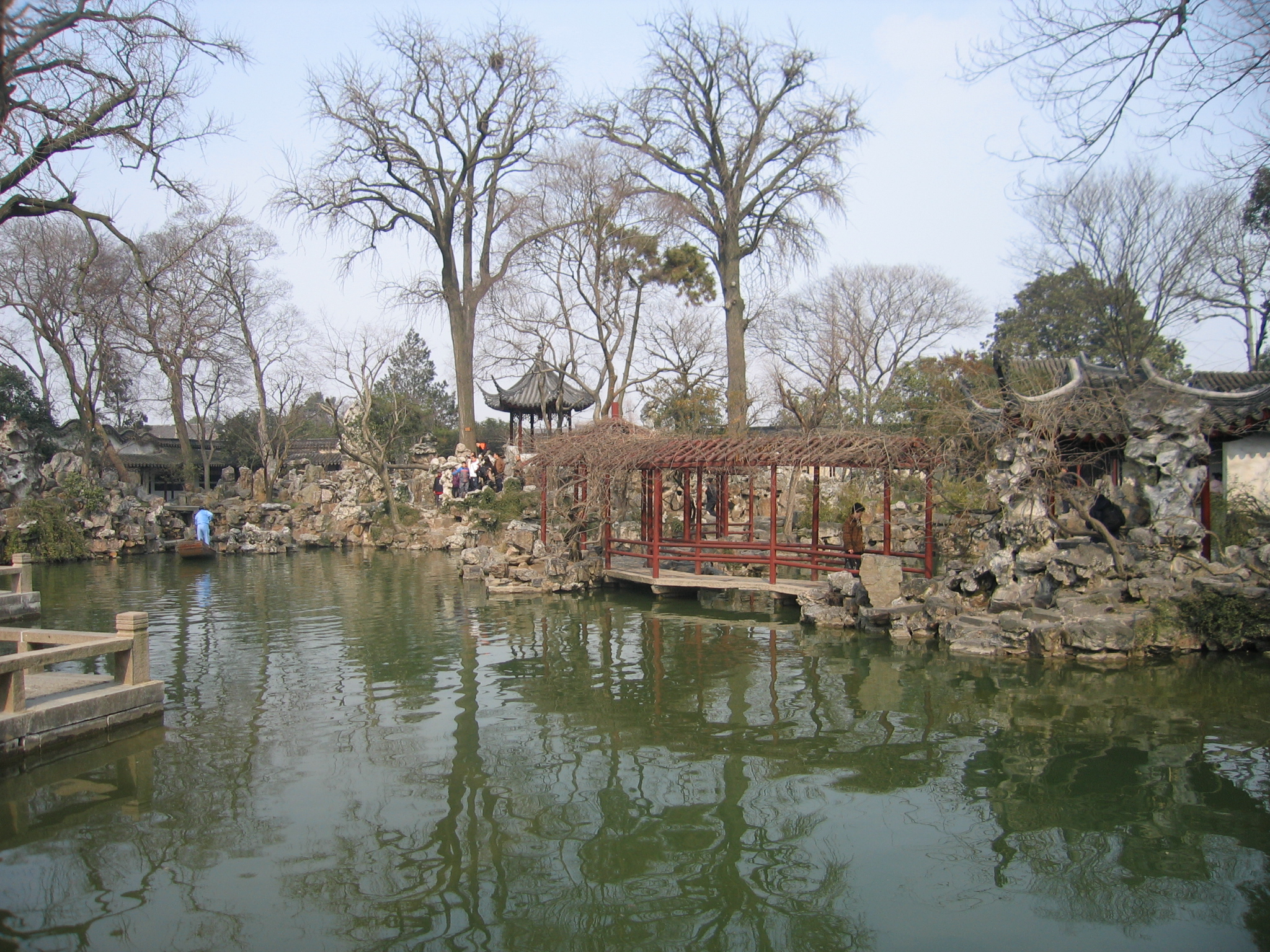
Pond of the Lingering Garden, in Suzhou

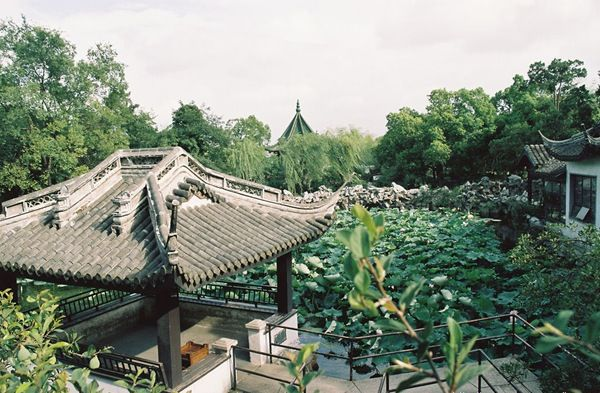
Lake with water lilies in Liyuan Garden, Wuxi

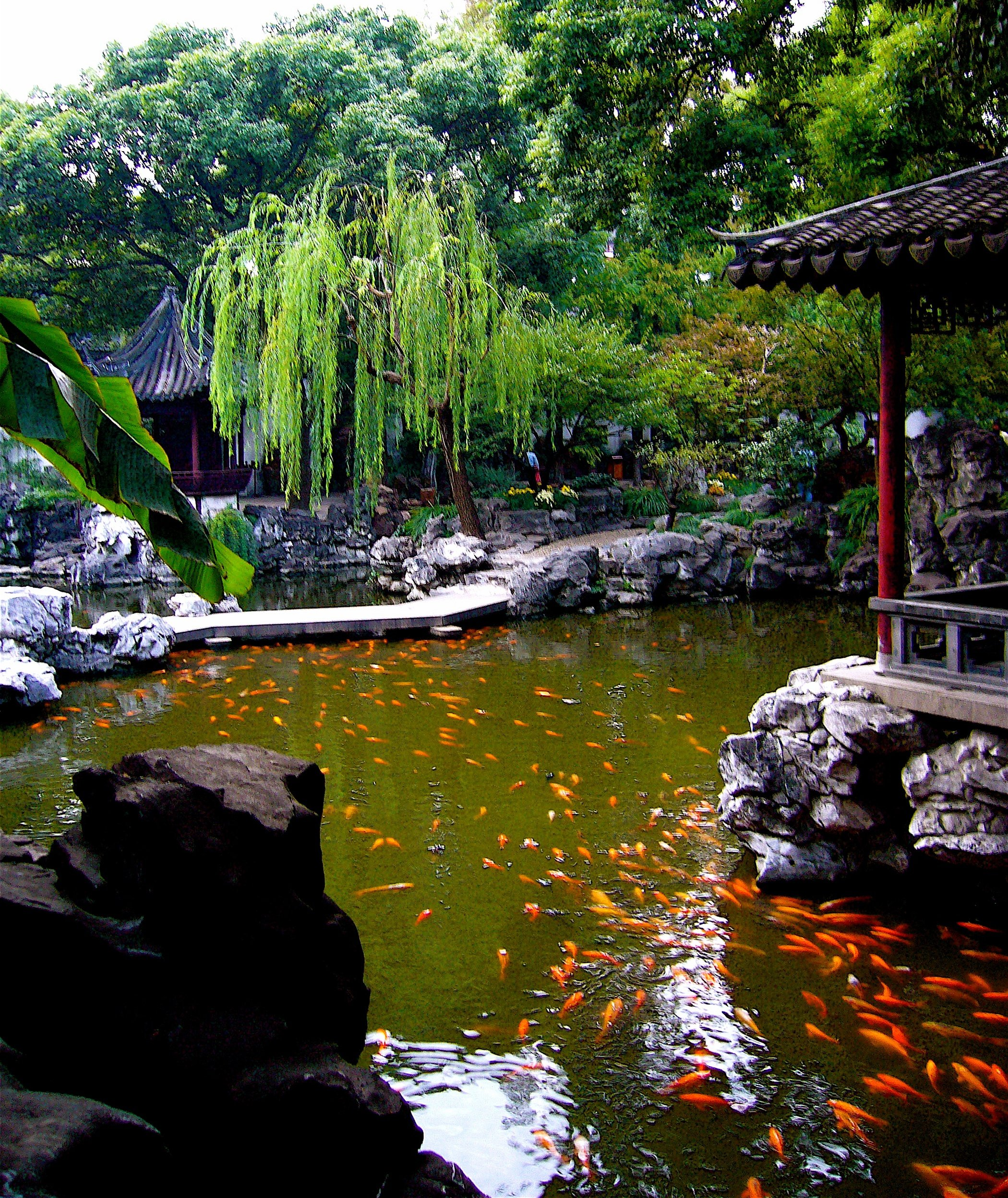
Koi in the Yuyuan Garden in Shanghai

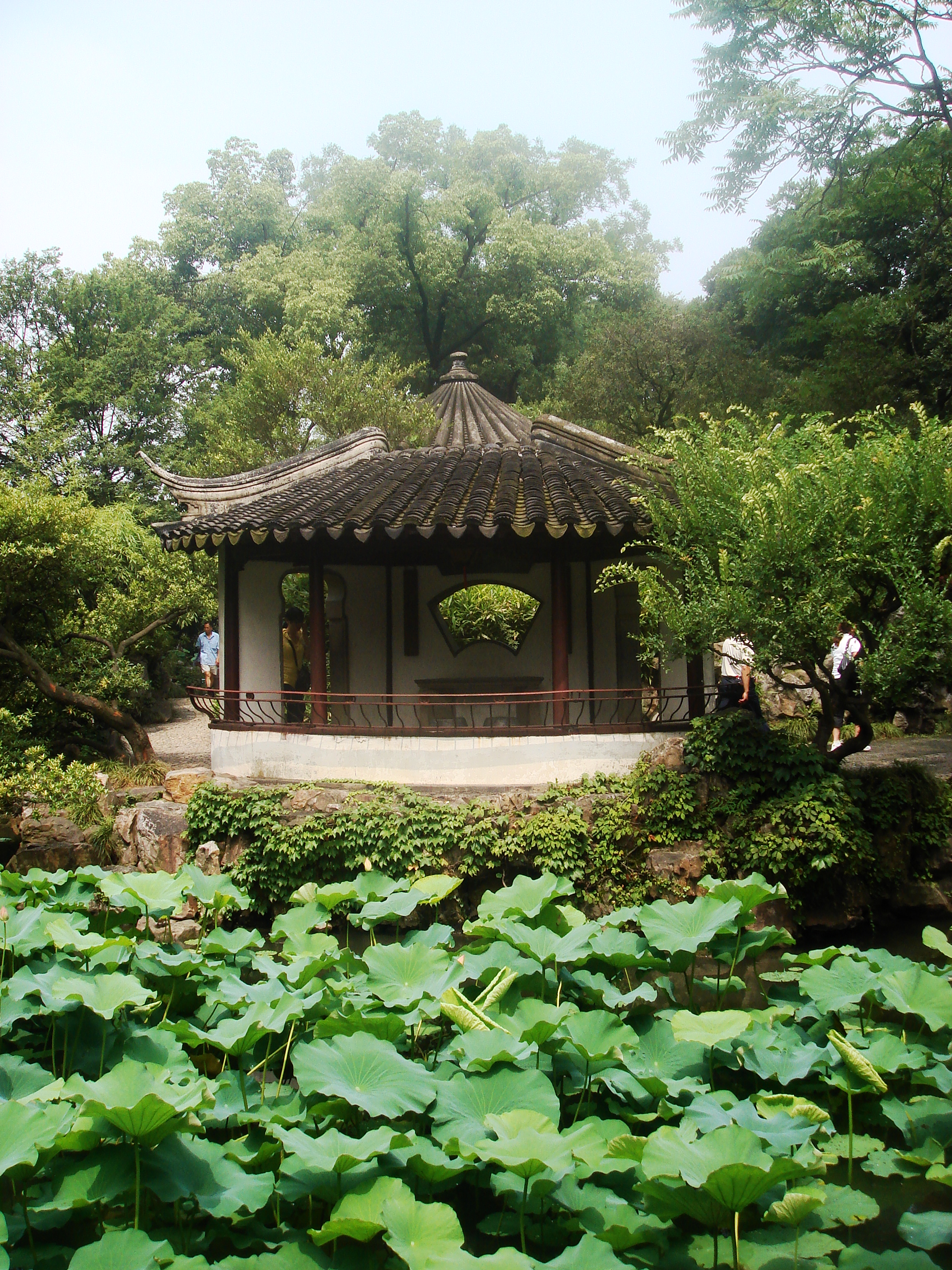
Pond and viewing pavilion in the Humble Administrator's Garden, in Suzhou

=== Flowers and trees ===
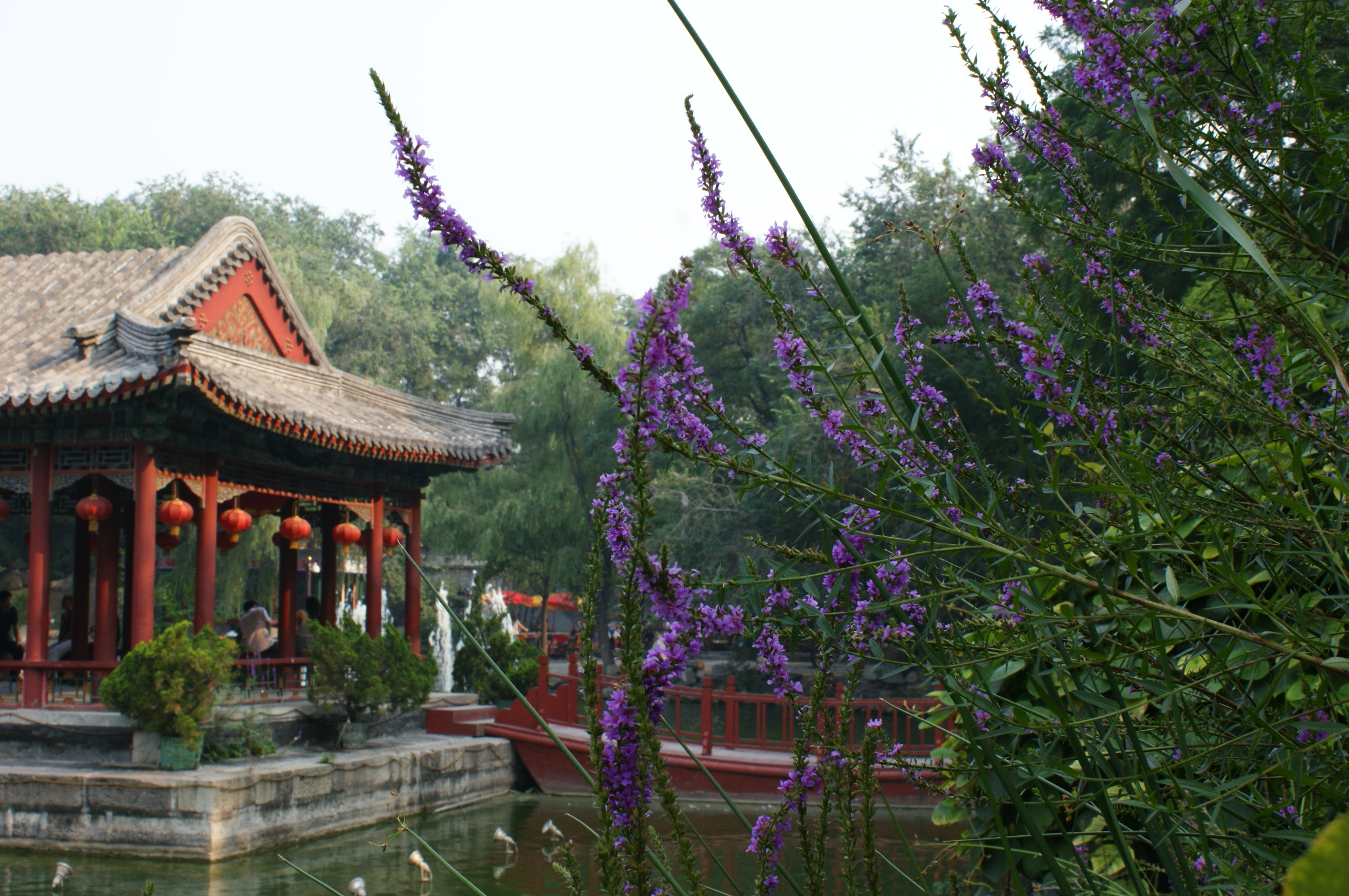
Blossoming tree by the lake at the Prince Gong Mansion in Beijing

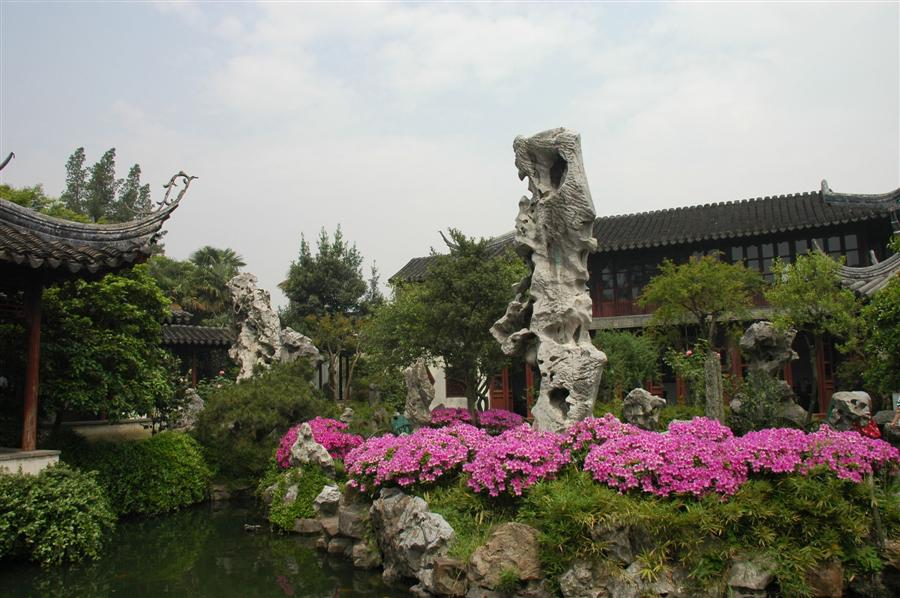
In the Lingering Garden in Suzhou, flowers provide a contrast with a scholar stone chosen to represent Mount Tiantai, one of the founding centers of Chinese Buddhism.

Flowers and trees, along with water, rocks and architecture, are the fourth essential element of the Chinese garden. They represent nature in its most vivid form, and contrast with the straight lines of the architecture and the permanence, sharp edges and immobility of the rocks. They change continually with the seasons, and provide both sounds (the sound of rain on banana leaves or the wind in the bamboo) and aromas to please the visitor.

Each flower and tree in the garden had its own symbolic meaning. The pine, bamboo and Chinese plum (Prunus mume) were considered the "Three Friends of Winter" (歲寒三友) by the scholars who created classical gardens, prized for remaining green or blooming in winter. They were often painted together by artists like Zhao Mengjian (1199–1264). For scholars, the pine was the emblem of longevity and tenacity, as well as constance in friendship. The bamboo, a hollow straw, represented a wise man, modest and seeking knowledge, and was also noted for being flexible in a storm without breaking. Plum trees were revered as the symbol of rebirth after the winter and the arrival of spring. During the Song dynasty, the favorite tree was the winter plum tree, appreciated for its early pink and white blossoms and sweet aroma.

The peach tree in the Chinese garden symbolized longevity and immortality. Peaches were associated with the classic story The Orchard of Xi Wangmu, the Queen Mother of the West. This story said that in Xi Wangmu's legendary orchard, peach trees flowered only after three thousand years, did not produce fruit for another three thousand years, and did not ripen for another three thousand years. Those who ate these peaches became immortal. This legendary orchard was pictured in many Chinese paintings, and inspired many garden scenes. Pear trees were the symbol of justice and wisdom. The word 'pear' was also a homophone for 'quit' or separate,' and it was considered bad luck to cut a pear, for it would lead to the breakup of a friendship or romance. The pear tree could also symbolize a long friendship or romance, since the tree lived a long time.

The apricot tree symbolized the way of the mandarin, or the government official. During the Tang dynasty, those who passed the imperial examination were rewarded with the banquet in the garden of the apricot trees, or Xingyuan.

The fruit of the pomegranate tree was offered to young couples so they would have male children and numerous descendants. The willow tree represented the friendship and the pleasures of life. Guests were offered willow branches as a symbol of friendship.

Of the flowers in the Chinese garden, the most appreciated were the orchid, peony, and lotus (Nelumbo nucifera). During the Tang dynasty, the peony, the symbol of opulence and a flower with a delicate fragrance, was the most celebrated flower in the garden. The poet Zhou Dunyi wrote a famous elegy to the lotus, comparing it to a junzi, a man who possessed integrity and balance. The orchid was the symbol of nobility, and of impossible love, as in the Chinese expression "a faraway orchid in a lonely valley." The lotus was admired for its purity, and its efforts to reach out of the water to flower in the air made it a symbol of the search for knowledge. The chrysanthemum was elegized the poet Tao Yuanming, who surrounded his hermit's hut with the flower, and wrote a famous verse:

"At the feet of the Eastern fence, I pick a chrysanthemum, In the distance, detached and serene, I see the Mountains of the South."

The creators of the Chinese garden were careful to preserve the natural appearance of the landscape. Trimming and root pruning, if done at all, tried to preserve the natural form. Dwarf trees that were gnarled and ancient-looking were particularly prized in the miniature landscapes of Chinese gardens.

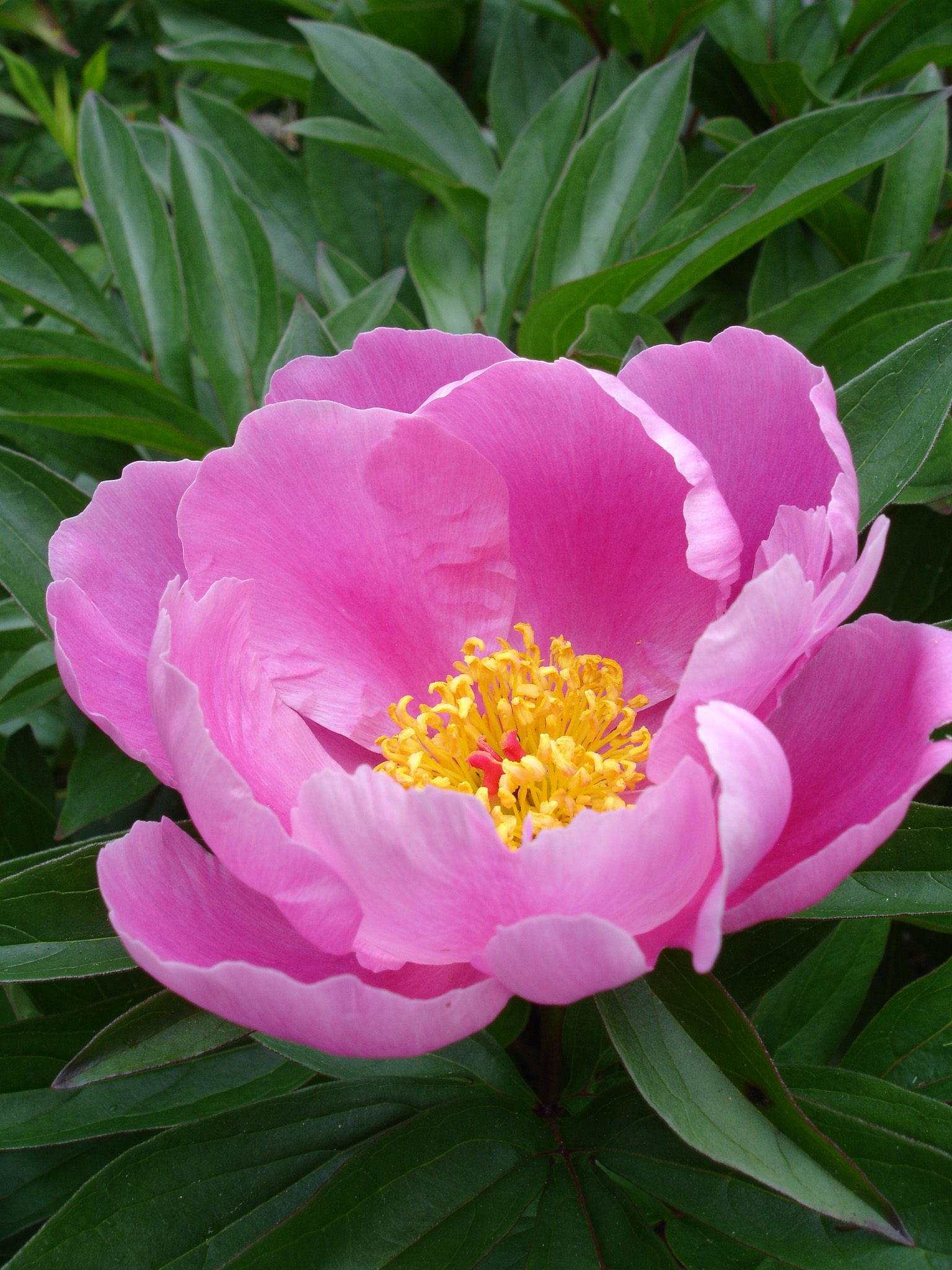
The Paeonia lactiflora

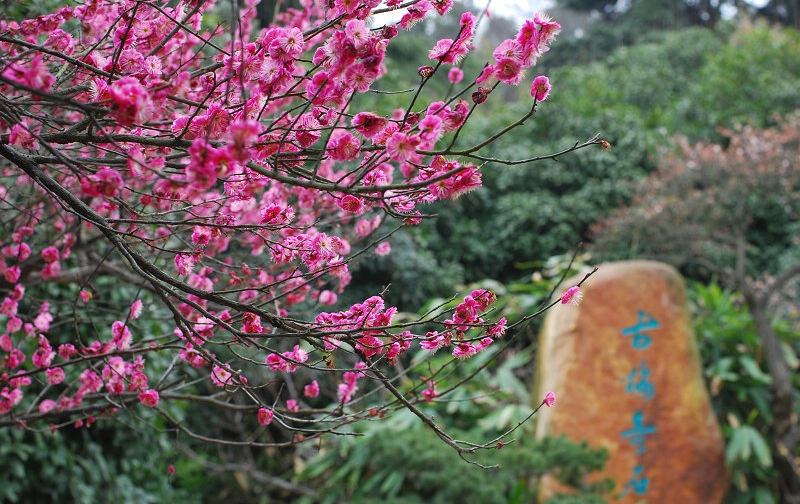
Plum blossoms (Prunus mume) in the Plum Garden, Jiangsu

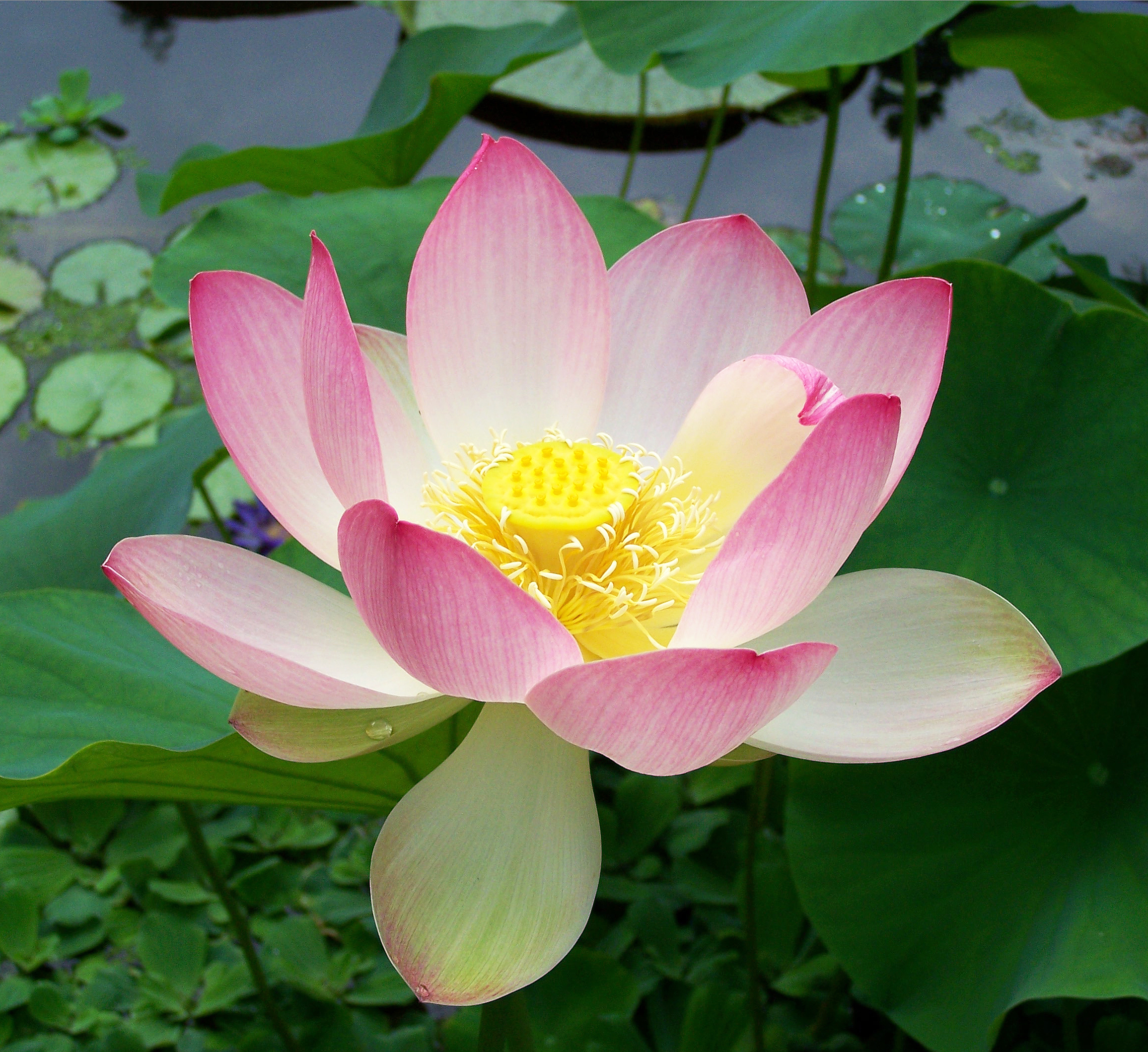
Lotus blossom (Nelumbo nucifera)

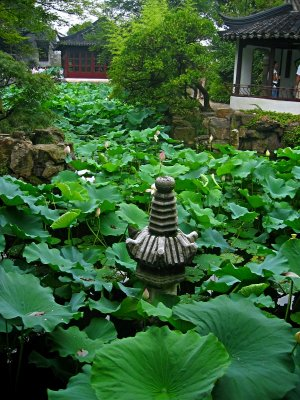
The lotus pond in Humble Administrator's Garden

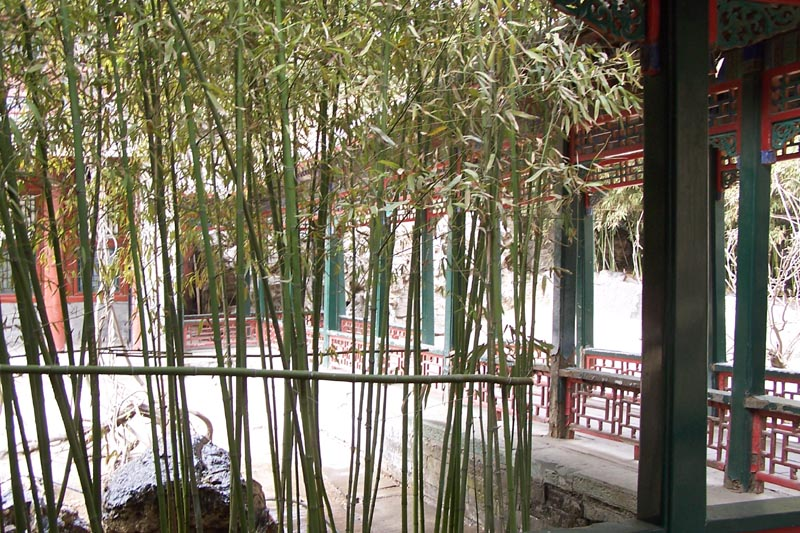
Bamboo in a garden in the Summer Palace

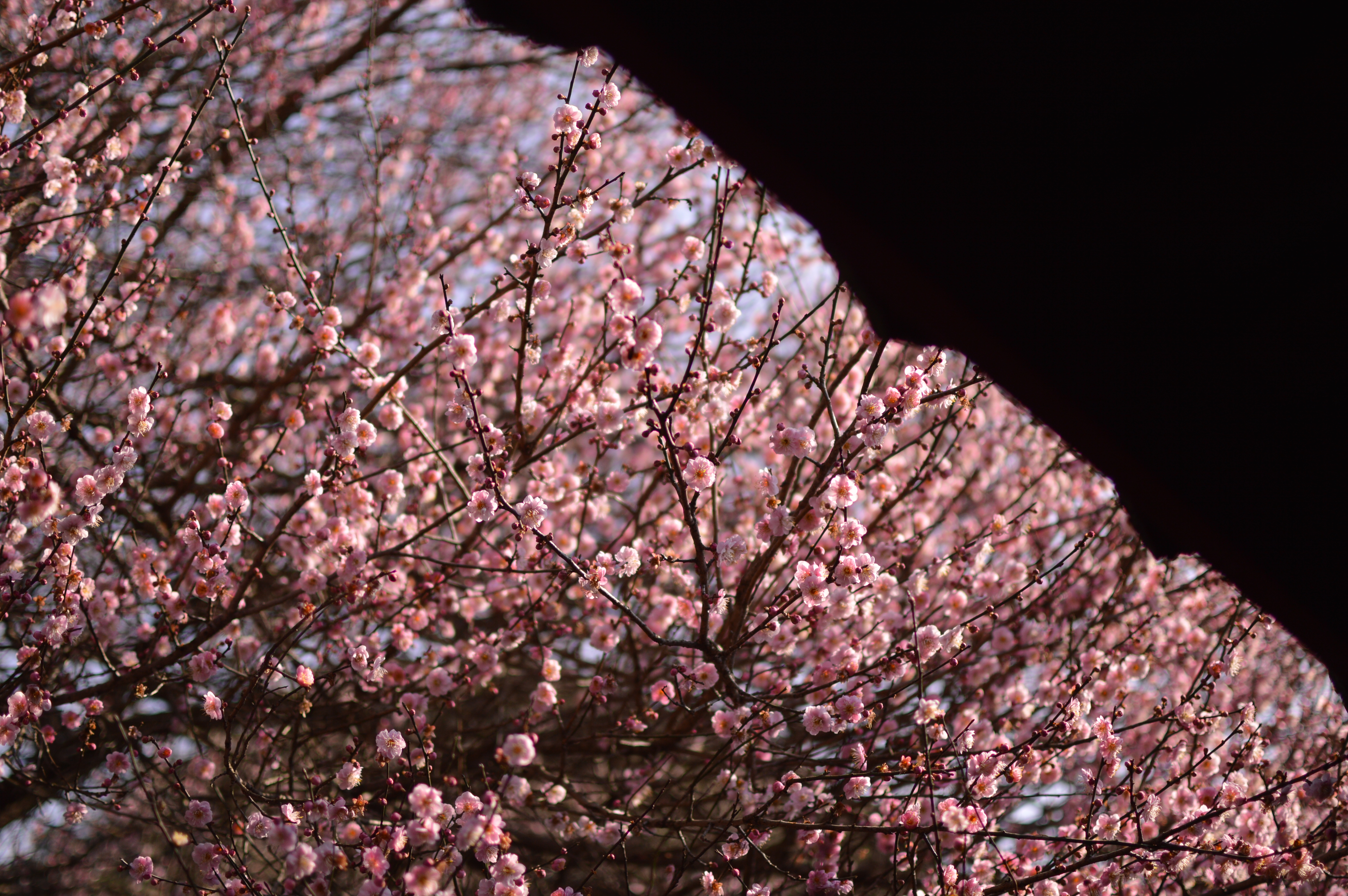
Plum blossom in Linyang Temple

=== "Borrowing scenery", time and seasons ===
According to Ji Cheng's 16th century book Yuanye, "The Craft of Gardens," "borrowed scenery" (jiejing) was the most important thing of a garden. This could mean using scenes outside the garden, such as a view of distant mountains or the trees in the neighboring garden, to create the illusion that garden was much bigger than it was. The most famous example was the mist-shrouded view of the North Temple Pagoda in Suzhou, seen in the distance over the pond of the Humble Administrator's Garden.

But, as Ji Cheng wrote, it could also be "the immaculate ribbon of a stream, animals, birds, fish, or other natural elements (rain, wind, snow), or something less tangible, such as a moonbeam, a reflection in a lake, morning mist, or the red sky of a sunset." It could also be a sound; he recommended locating a pavilion near a temple, so that the chanted prayers could be heard; planting fragrant flowers next to paths and pavilions, so visitors would appreciate their aromas; that bird perches be created to encourage birds to come to sing in the garden, that streams be designed to make pleasant sounds, and that banana trees be planted in courtyards so the rain would patter on their leaves. "A judicious 'borrowing' does not have a reason." Ji Cheng wrote. "It is born simply of feeling created by the beauty of a scene."

The season and the time of day were also important elements. Garden designers took into account the scenes of the garden that would look best in winter, summer, spring and autumn, and those best viewed at night, in the morning or afternoon. Ji Cheng wrote: "In the heart of the tumult of the city, you should choose visions that are serene and refined: from a raised clearing, you look to the distant horizon, surrounded by mountains like a screen; in an open pavilion, a gentle and light breeze invades the room; from the front door, the running water of spring flows toward the marsh."

Actually borrowing scenery is the conclusive, last chapter of Yuanye that explains borrowing scenery as a holistic understanding of the essence of landscape design in its entirety. The ever-changing moods and appearances of nature in a given landscape in full action are understood by the author as an independent function that becomes an agent for garden making. It is nature including the garden maker that creates.

=== Concealment and surprise ===
Another important garden element was concealment and surprise. The garden was not meant to be seen all at once, it was laid out to present a series of scenes. Visitors moved from scene to scene either within enclosed galleries or by winding paths which concealed the scenes until the last moment. The scenes would suddenly appear at the turn of a path, through a window, or hidden behind a screen of bamboo. They might be revealed through round "moon doors" or through windows of unusual shapes, or windows with elaborate lattices that broke the view into pieces.

== In art and literature ==
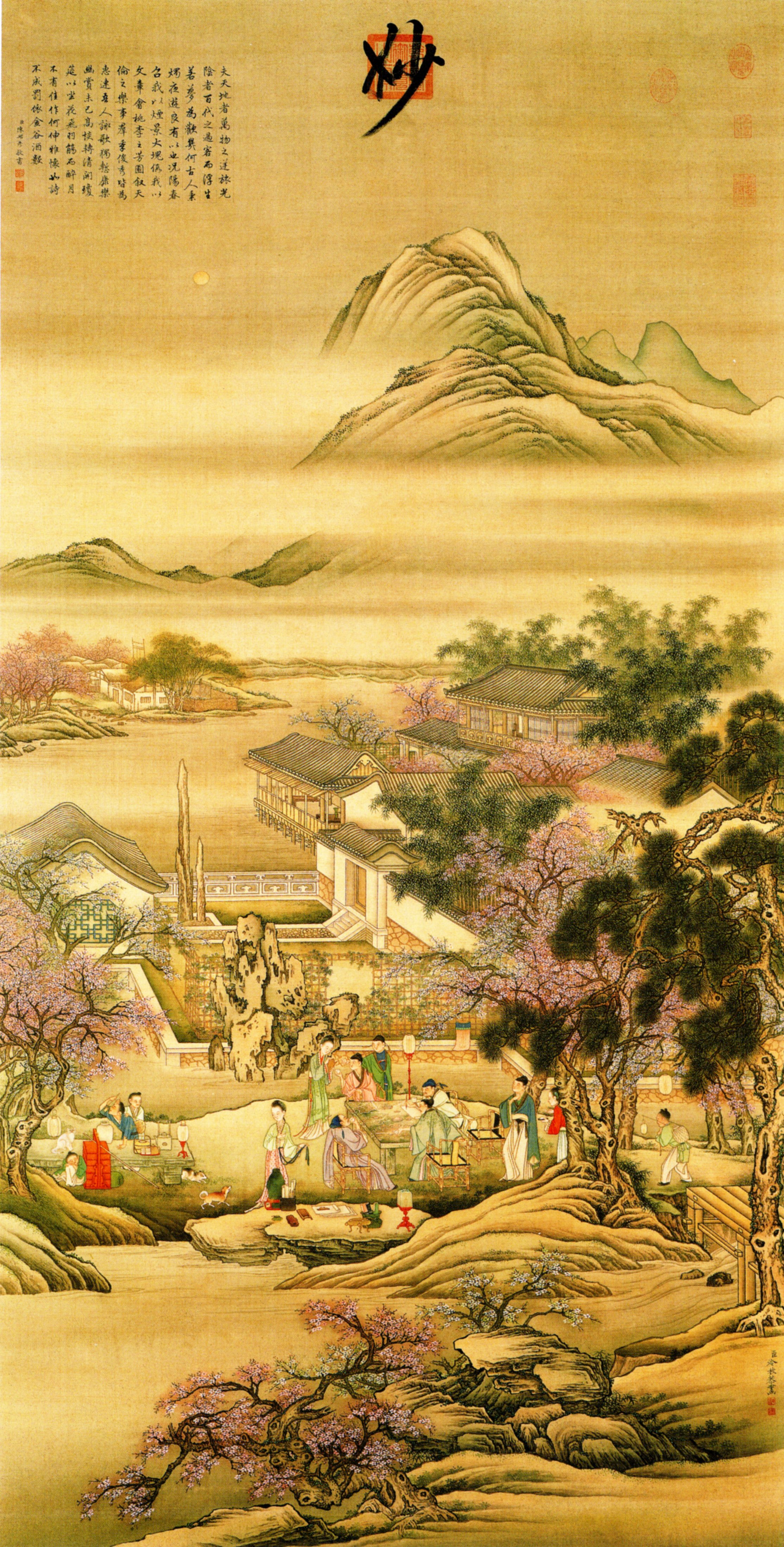
"The Spring Evening Banquet in the Peach and Pear Blossom Garden, by Leng Mei (1677–1742) illustrates a famous garden poem by Li Bai.

The garden plays an important part in Chinese art and literature, and at the same time art and literature have inspired many gardens. The school of painting called "Shanshui" (literally 'mountains and water' and with the actual meaning of 'landscape'), which began in the 5th century, established the principles of Chinese landscape painting, which were very similar to those of Chinese gardening. These paintings were not meant to be realistic; they were meant to portray what the artist felt, rather than what he saw.

The landscape painter Shitao (1641–1720) wrote that he wanted to "'...create a landscape which was not spoiled by any vulgar banality..." He wanted to create a sense of vertigo in the viewer: "to express a universe inaccessible to man, without any route that led there, like the isles of Bohai, Penglan and Fanghu, where only the immortals can live, and which a man cannot imagine. That is the vertigo that exists in the natural universe. To express it in painting, you must show jagged peaks, precipices, hanging bridges, great chasms. For the effect to be truly marvelous, it must be done purely by the force of the brush." This was the emotion that garden designers wanted to create with their scholar rocks and miniature mountain ranges.

In his book, Craft of Gardens, the garden designer Ji Cheng wrote: "The spirit and the charm of mountains and forests must be studied in depth; ...only the knowledge of the real permits the creation of the artificial, so that the work created possesses the spirit of the real, in part because of divine inspiration, but especially because of human effort." He described the effect he wanted to achieve in the design of an autumn garden scene: "The feelings are in harmony with the purity, with the sense of withdrawal. The spirit rejoices at the mountains and ravines. Suddenly the spirit, detached from the world of small things, is animated and seems to penetrate to the interior of a painting, and to promenade there..."

In literature, gardens were frequently the subject of the genre of poetry called "Tianyuan", literally 'fields and gardens,' which reached its peak in the Tang dynasty (618–907) with such poets as Wang Wei (701–761). The names of the Surging Waves Garden and the Garden of Meditation in Suzhou are taken from lines of Chinese poetry. Within the gardens, the individual pavilions and view points were frequently dedicated to verses of poems, inscribed on stones or plaques. The Moon Comes with the Breeze Pavilion at the Couple's Retreat Garden, used for moon-viewing, has the inscription of a verse by Han Yu:

"The twilight brings the Autumn
And the wind brings the moon here."

And the Peony Hall in the Couple's Retreat Garden is dedicated to a verse by Li Bai:

"The spring breeze is gently stroking the balustrade
and the peony is wet with dew."

Wang Wei (701–761) was a poet, painter and Buddhist monk, who worked first as a court official before retiring to Lantian, where he built one of the first wenren yuan, or scholar's gardens, called the Valley of the Jante. In this garden, a series of twenty scenes, like the paintings of a scroll or album, unrolled before the viewer, each illustrated by a verse of poetry. For example, one scene illustrated this poem:

"The white rock emerges from the torrent;
The cold sky with red leaves scattering:
On the mountain path, the rain is fleeing,
the blue of the emptiness dampens our clothes."

The Valley of the Jante garden disappeared, but its memory, preserved in paintings and poems, inspired many other scholar's gardens.

The social and cultural importance of the garden is illustrated in the classical novel Dream of the Red Chamber by Cao Xueqin which unfolds almost exclusively in a garden.

== Philosophy ==
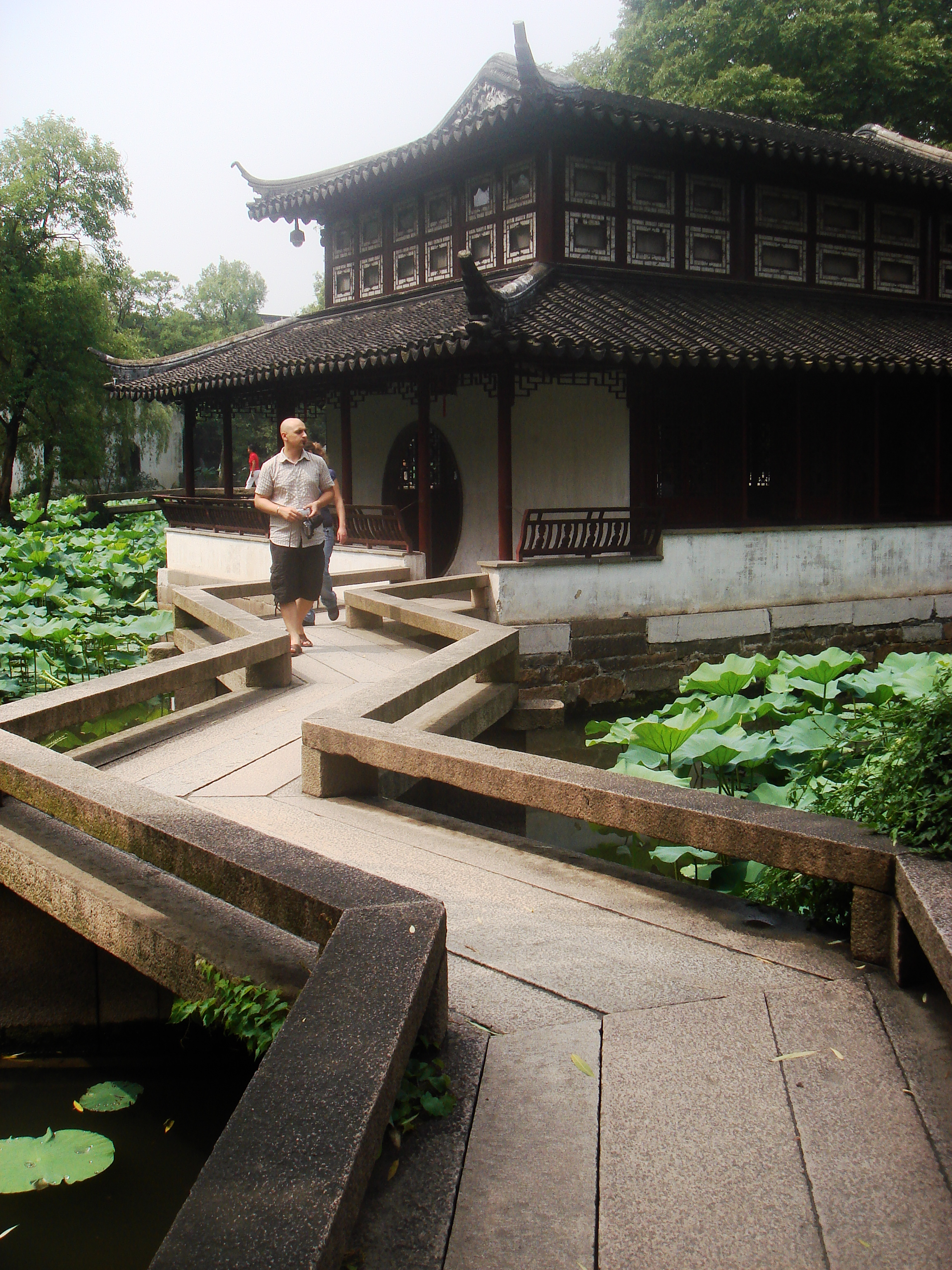
The zig-zag bridge in the Humble Administrator's Garden illustrates the proverb, "By detours, access to secrets."

Even though everything [in the garden] is the work of man, it must appear to have been created by heaven...

— Ji Cheng, Yuanye, or The Craft of Gardens (1633)

The Chinese classical garden had multiple functions. It could be used for banquets, celebrations, reunions, or romance. It could be used to find solitude and for contemplation. It was a calm place for painting, poetry, calligraphy, and music, and for studying classic texts. It was a place for drinking tea and for poets to become happily drunk on wine. It was a showcase to display the cultivation and aesthetic taste of the owner. But it also had a philosophical message.

Taoism had a strong influence on the classical garden. After the Han dynasty (206 BC – 220 AD), gardens were frequently constructed as retreats for government officials who had lost their posts or who wanted to escape the pressures and corruption of court life in the capital. They chose to pursue the Taoist ideals of disengagement from worldly concerns.

For followers of Taoism, enlightenment could be reached by contemplation of the unity of creation, in which order and harmony are inherent to the natural world.

The gardens were intended to evoke the idyllic feeling of wandering through a natural landscape, to feel closer to the ancient way of life, and to appreciate the harmony between man and nature.

In Taoism, rocks and water were opposites, yin and yang, but they complemented and completed one another. Rocks were solid but water could wear away rock. The deeply eroded rocks from Lake Tai used in the classical garden illustrated this principle.

Borrowing scenery is a most fundamental idea in Ming period garden making theory (see above).

The winding paths and zig-zag galleries bridges that led visitors from one garden scene to another also had a message. They illustrated a Chinese proverb, "By detours, access to secrets".

According to the landscape historian and architect Che Bing Chiu, every garden was "a quest for paradise. of a lost world, of a utopian universe. The scholar's garden participated in this quest; on the one hand the quest for the home of the Immortals, on the other hand the search for the world of the golden age so dear to the heart of the scholar."

A more recent view of the philosophy of the garden was expressed by Zhou Ganzhi, the President of the Chinese Society of Landscape Architecture, and Academician at the Chinese Academy of Sciences and the Chinese Academy of Engineering, in 2007: "Chinese classical gardens are a perfect integration of nature and work by man. They are an imitation of nature, and fully manifest the beauty of nature. They can also be seen as an improvement on nature; one from which the light of human artistic genius shines."

== Influence ==
=== Chinese influence on the Japanese garden ===
The Chinese classical garden had a notable influence on the early Japanese garden. The influence of China first reached Japan through Korea before 600 AD. In 607 AD, the Japanese crown prince Shotoku sent a diplomatic mission to the Chinese court, which began a cultural exchange lasting for centuries. Hundreds of Japanese scholars were sent to study the Chinese language, political system, and culture. The Japanese Ambassador to China, Ono no Imoko, described the great landscape gardens of the Chinese Emperor to the Japanese court. His reports had a profound influence on the development of Japanese landscape design.

During the Nara period (710–794), when the Japanese capital was located at Nara, and later at Heian, the Japanese court created large landscape gardens with lakes and pavilions on the Chinese model for aristocrats to promenade and to drift leisurely in small boats, and more intimate gardens for contemplation and religious meditation.

A Japanese monk named Eisai (1141–1215) imported the Rinzai school of Zen Buddhism from China to Japan, which led to the creation of a famous and unique Japanese gardening style, the Zen garden, exemplified by the garden of Ryōan-ji. He also brought green tea from China to Japan, originally to keep monks awake during long meditation, giving the basis for the Japanese tea ceremony, which became an important ritual in Japanese gardens.

The Japanese garden designer Muso Soseki (1275–1351) created the celebrated Moss Garden (Kokedera) in Kyoto, which included a recreation of the Isles of Eight Immortals, called Horai in Japanese, which were an important feature of many Chinese gardens. During the Kamakura period (1185–1333), and particularly during the Muromachi period (1336–1573) the Japanese garden became more austere than the Chinese garden, following its own aesthetic principles.

=== In Europe ===
A fanciful view of a Chinese garden by the French painter François Boucher (1742)

The first European to describe a Chinese garden was the Venetian merchant and traveler Marco Polo, who visited the summer palace of Kublai Khan at Xanadu. The garden of Kublai Khan had a later effect on European culture; In 1797, it inspired the romantic poem, Kubla Khan, by the English romantic poet Samuel Taylor Coleridge.

Marco Polo also described the gardens of the imperial palace in Khanbaliq, the Mongol name for the city which eventually became Beijing. He described ramparts, balustrades and pavilions surrounding a deep lake full of fish and with swans and other aquatic birds; whose central feature was a manmade hill one hundred steps high and a thousand steps around, covered with evergreen trees and decorated with green azurite stones.

The first Jesuit priest, Francis Xavier, arrived in China in 1552, and the priest Matteo Ricci received permission to settle in Beijing in 1601. Jesuit priests began sending accounts of Chinese culture and gardens to Europe. Louis Le Comte, the mathematician to the King of France, travelled to China in 1685. He described how the Chinese gardens had grottos, artificial hills and rocks piled to imitate nature, and did not arrange their gardens geometrically.

In the 18th century, as Chinese vases and other decorative objects began to arrive in Europe, there was a surge of popularity for Chinoiserie. The painters Watteau and François Boucher painted Chinese scenes as they imagined them, and Catherine the Great decorated a room in her palace in Chinese style. There was great interest in everything Chinese, including gardens.

In 1738, the French Jesuit missionary and painter Jean Denis Attiret, went to China, where he became court painter to the Qianlong Emperor. He described in great detail what he saw in the imperial gardens near Beijing:

"One comes out of a valley, not by a straight wide alley as in Europe, but by zigzags, by roundabout paths, each one ornamented with small pavilions and grottos, and when you exit one valley you find yourself in another, different from the first in the form of the landscape or the style of the buildings. All the mountains and hills are covered with flowering trees, which are very common here. It is a true terrestrial paradise. The canals are not at all like ours- bordered with cut stone- they are rustic, with pieces of rock, some leaning forward, some backwards, placed with such art you would think they were natural. Sometimes a canal is wide, sometimes narrow. Here they twist, there they curve, as if they were really created by the hills and rocks. The edges are planted with flowers in rock gardens, which seem to have been created by nature. Each season has its own flowers. Aside from the canals, everywhere there are paths paved with small stones, which lead from one valley to the other. These paths also twist and turn, sometimes coming close to the canals, sometimes far away."

Attiret wrote:

"Everything is truly great and beautiful, both as to the design and the execution: and [the gardens] struck me the more, because I had never seen any thing that bore any manner of resemblance to them, in any part of the world that I had been before."

The Qianlong Emperor (1711–1799) was equally interested in what was going on in Europe. He commissioned the Jesuit priest Father Castiglione, who was trained in engineering, to build fountains for his garden similar to those he had heard about in the gardens at Versailles.

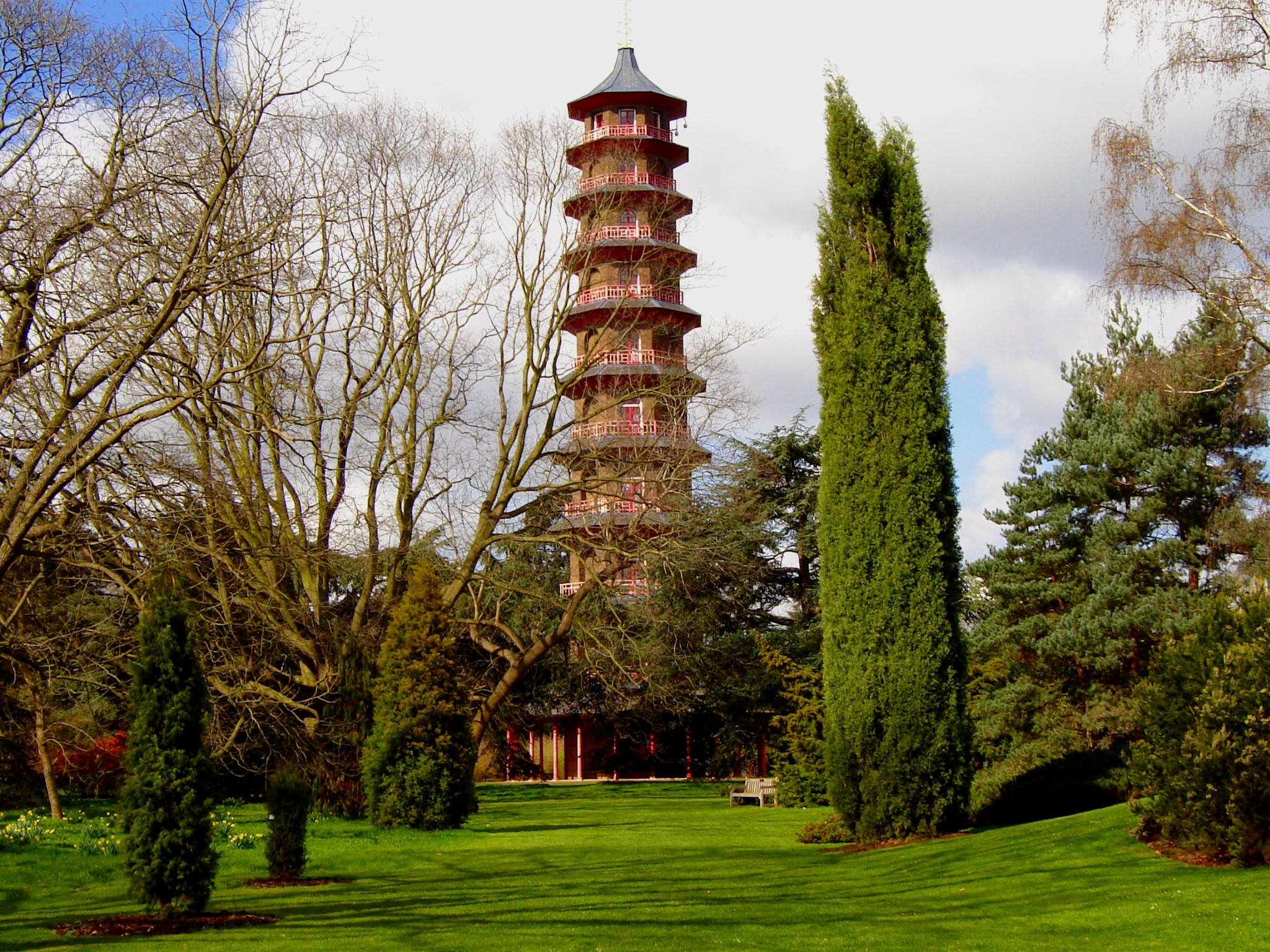
The Great Pagoda in the Royal Botanic Gardens at Kew, London, 1761.

Chinese architecture and aesthetics may also have influenced the English landscape garden style. In 1685, the English diplomat and writer Sir William Temple wrote an essay Upon the garden of Epicurus (published in 1692), a passage in which contrasted European theories of symmetrical gardens with asymmetrical compositions from China. Temple had never visited China, but had heard of Chinese (or Japanese) gardens, perhaps in the Netherlands. He noted that Chinese gardens avoided formal rows of trees and flower beds, and instead placed trees, plants, and other garden features in irregular ways to strike the eye and create beautiful compositions. He gave the term Sharawadgi to this approach. His observations on the Chinese garden were cited by the essayist Joseph Addison in an essay in 1712, who used them to attack the English gardeners who, instead of imitating nature, tried to make their gardens in the French style, as far from nature as possible.

The English landscape garden was already well-established in England in the first part of the 18th century, influenced by the travel to Italy by the British upper class and their desire to have a new style of garden to match the Palladian style of architecture they chose for their country houses, and by the romantic landscapes of Claude Lorrain and other painters, but the novelty and exoticism of Chinese art and architecture in Europe led in 1738 to the construction of the first Chinese house in an English garden, at Stowe House, alongside Roman temples, Gothic ruins and other architectural styles.

On the first view of the coast of China the stranger concludes that the inhabitants are a nation of gardeners.

— James Main, 1827

The style became even more popular thanks to William Chambers (1723–1796), who lived in China from 1745 to 1747, and wrote a book, The Drawings, buildings, furniture, habits, machines and untensils of the Chinese, published in 1757. He urged western garden designers to use Chinese stylistic conventions such as concealment, asymmetry, and naturalism. Later, in 1772, Chambers published his Dissertation on Oriental Gardening, a rather fanciful elaboration of contemporary ideas about the naturalistic style of gardening in China.

Chambers was a fierce critic of Capability Brown, the leading designer of the English landscape garden, which Chambers considered boring. Chambers believed that gardens should be full of surprises. In 1761 he built the Great Pagoda in Kew Gardens, London, along with a mosque, a temple of the sun, a ruined arch, and Palladian bridge. Thanks to Chambers Chinese structures began to appear in other English gardens, then in France and elsewhere on the continent. Carmontelle added a Chinese pavilion to his garden at Parc Monceau in Paris (1772), and the Duc de Choiseul built a pagoda on his estate at Chanteloup between 1775 and 1778, now the only part of the estate to survive. The Russian Empress Catherine the Great built her own pagoda in the garden of her palace of Tsarskoye Selo, near Saint Petersburg, between 1778 and 1786. Many French critics disliked the term "English Garden", so they began to use the term 'Anglo-Chinois" to describe the style.

== See also ==
- Classical Gardens of Suzhou
- Chengde Mountain Resort
- Ji Cheng
- Moon gate
- Moon Bridge
- List of Chinese gardens
- List of botanical gardens in China
- Pear Garden
- Penjing
- Gongshi
- West Lake
- Borrowed scenery
- Chinese architecture
