= Zhan Garden =

Zhan Garden may refer to several gardens in China:

- Zhan Yuan (Nanjing)
- Zhan Garden, Zhongshan
