= Liyuan =

Liyuan may refer to:

== Places in China ==
=== Inhabited places ===
- Liyuan, Beijing (梨园地区), an area of Tongzhou District, Beijing
- Liyuan, Sangzhi, a town in Zhangjiajie, Hunan
- Liyuan, Qinyuan County (李元镇), a town in Qinyuan County, Shanxi
- Liyuan, Wenxi County (礼元镇), a town in Wenxi County, Shanxi
- Liyuan Town (栗园镇), a town in Kaiping District, Tangshan, Hebei

=== Other places ===
- Liyuan Dam, on the Jinsha River in Yunnan
- Liyuan (garden), in Wuxi, China

== Other uses ==
- Liyuan opera (梨园戏), form of opera originating in Fujian, China
- 6741 Liyuan, a main-belt asteroid
- Pear Garden (梨园, or Liyuan Garden), first known royal acting and musical academy in China
- Peng Liyuan, Chinese singer and First Lady of China since 2012

== See also ==
- Liyuan station (disambiguation)
- Li Yuan (disambiguation)
