= Xu Garden =

Classical garden in Nanjing, China

Coordinates: 32.045126°N 118.792347°E

- 煦园
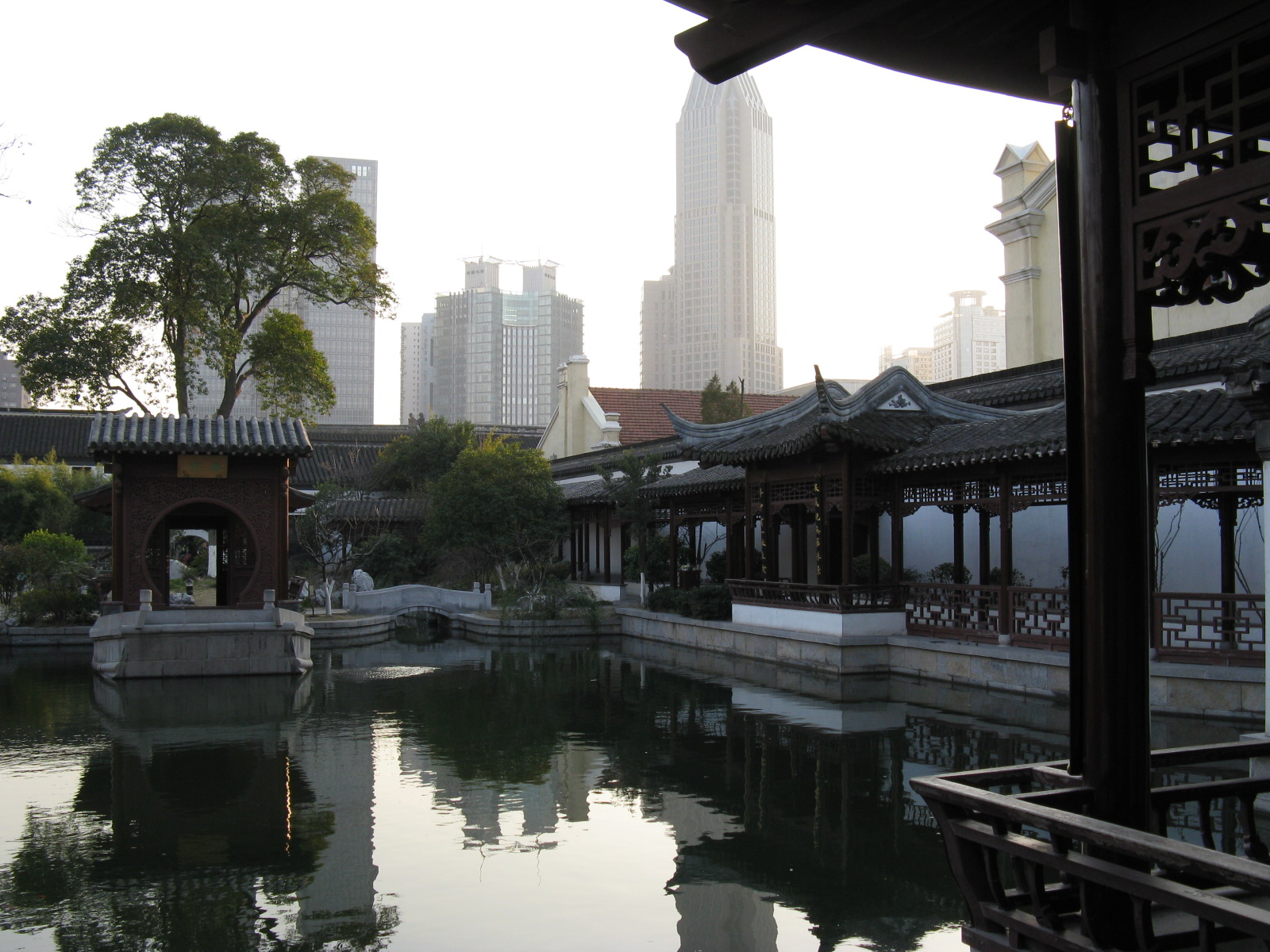
- The garden's East Lake
- Interactive map of Xu Garden
- Location: 292 Changjiang Rd., Xuanwu District, Nanjing, Jiangsu, PRC

Xu Garden
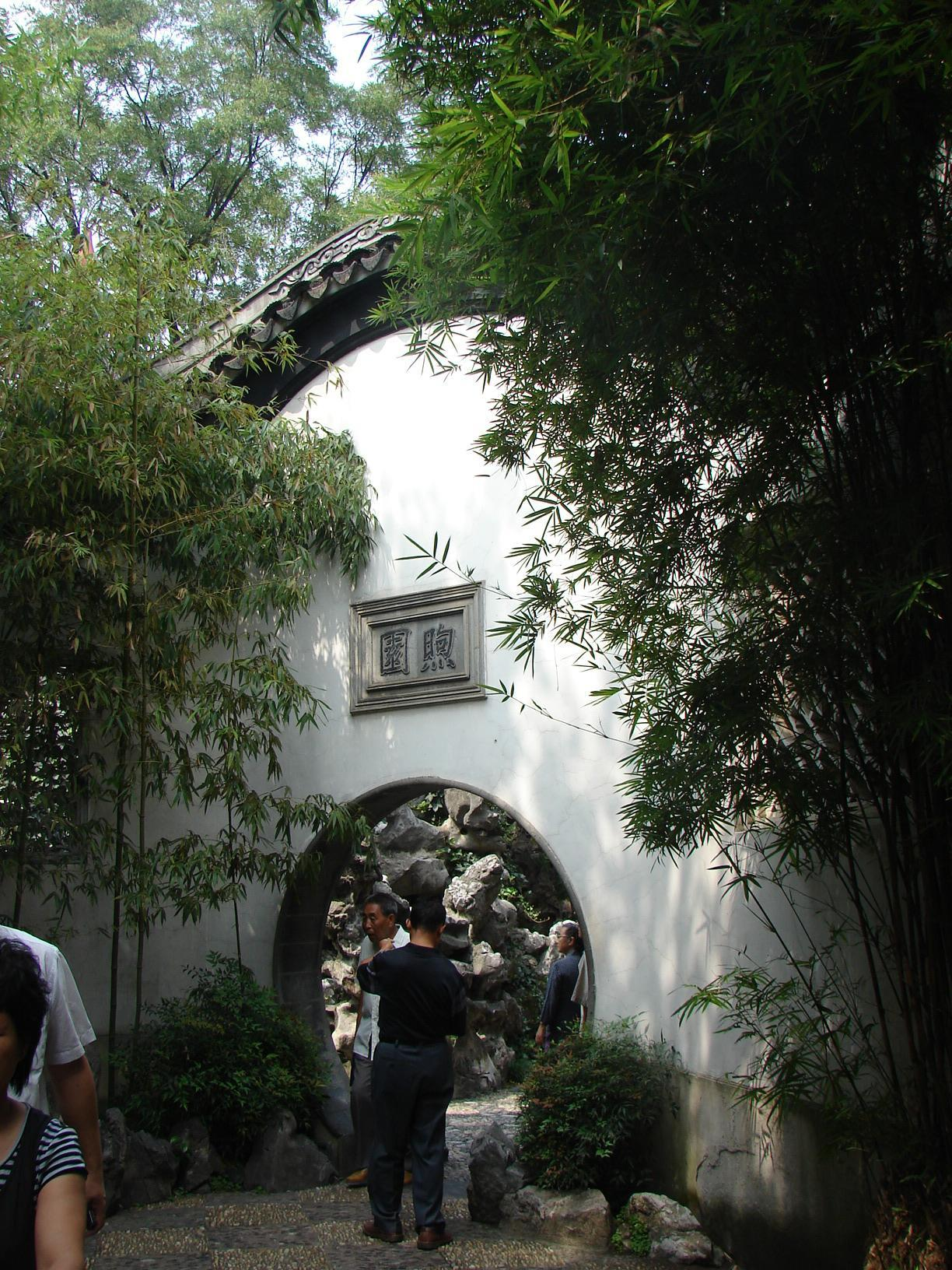
- Entrance
- Traditional Chinese: 煦園
- Simplified Chinese: 煦园
Transcriptions
Standard Mandarin
- Hanyu Pinyin: Xù Yuán
- Wade–Giles: Hsü Yüan

West Garden
- Traditional Chinese: 西花園
- Simplified Chinese: 西花园
- Literal meaning: West Garden
Transcriptions
Standard Mandarin
- Hanyu Pinyin: Xī Huāyuán
- Wade–Giles: Hsi Hua-yüan

Xu Garden, also known as the West Garden and by other names, is a Chinese garden on the west side of the former Presidential Palace in Xuanwu District in central Nanjing, Jiangsu Province, China. It and Zhan Garden are the two major gardens of the city.

== Names ==
Xu Garden is a partial calque of the Chinese name written 煦園 in traditional characters or 煦园 in simplified ones, both spelled Xù Yuán in the pinyin transcription of their Mandarin pronunciation. The garden is also sometimes known in English by its Chinese name, either as Xu Yuan, Xuyuan, or Xuyuan Garden.

It was formerly known as the "West Garden", a calque of the Chinese name 西花園 or 西花园, Xī Huāyuán. In similar fashion, it is sometimes referenced in English as Xi Huayuan, Xihuayuan, or Xihuayuan Garden.

== History ==
Xu Garden was originally the private garden at the residence of Zhu Gaoxu (1380–1426), Prince of Han and second son of the Yongle Emperor of the Ming dynasty.

Under the Qing, the residence was used by the Viceroy of Liangjiang, who governed the provinces of Jiangsu, Jiangxi, and Anhui on the emperor's behalf. The Kangxi Emperor visited Xu Garden five times during his six inspection tours of Jiangnan between 1684 and 1702.

When the forces of Hong Xiuquan occupied Nanjing during the Taiping Rebellion (1851–64), the residence became the Heavenly King's Palace and the park its West Garden. The garden was entirely destroyed by the Qing army during its reconquest of the city in 1864. Zeng Guofan ordered the garden rebuilt upon becoming viceroy of Liangjiang in 1870.

After the Xinhai Revolution, while the provisional government of the Republic of China was being set up in Nanjing in January 1912, the garden was used as the office and residence of the provisional president Sun Yat-sen. After the ROC government was formally established in April 1927, the garden housed the offices of the National Revolutionary Army, the Military Affairs Commission, and the Bureau of Investigation and Statistics.

Following the establishment of the People's Republic of China and its adoption of Deng Xiaoping's Reform and Opening Up Policy, Xu Garden was designated a Major Historical and Cultural Site Protected at the National Level along with the rest of the Former Location of the Heavenly King's Palace of the Taiping Heavenly Kingdom.

== Components ==
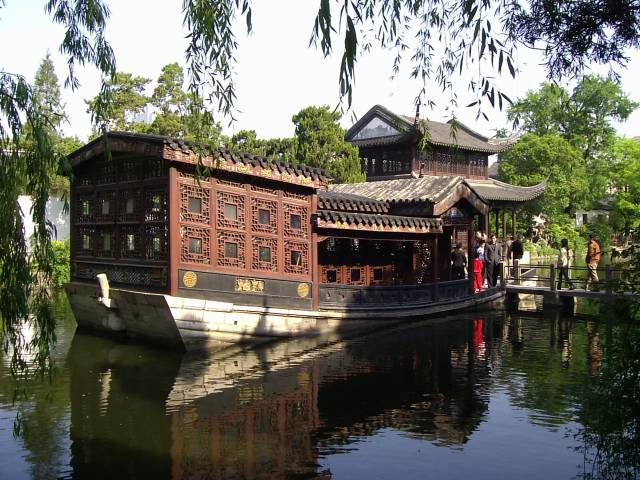
The "Unmoored Boat" at Xu Garden

The Paulownia Melody House (t 桐音館, s 桐音馆, Tóngyīn Guǎn) is the largest building in the garden, built with paulownia timber. It was used as Zeng Guofan's reception hall in the early 1870s. Several huge Chinese parasol trees are planted around the building, resonating pleasantly when rain falls.

The North Rockery is behind the Paulownia House. Its caves are interconnected to form a small labyrinth. Its entrance has a stone tablet engraved with the name "Heart-Imprinting" or "Initiation Stone Room" (印心石室, Yìnxīn Shíshì) in the calligraphy of the Daoguang Emperor of the Qing.

The South Rockery is composed of rocks supposed to resemble the 12 animals of the Chinese zodiac. The hexagonal pavilion in the rockery is also known as the Mandarin Duck Pavilion, from its twinned appearance.

A 14.5-meter (48 ft) gray stone boat engraved to mimic timber woodgrain sits in the garden pond. Called the "unmoored boat" (t 不繫舟, s 不系舟, bùxì zhōu) by the Qianlong Emperor, it has become a symbol of the garden.

== See also ==
- List of Chinese gardens
- Major national historical and cultural sites in Jiangsu
