= List of Chinese gardens =

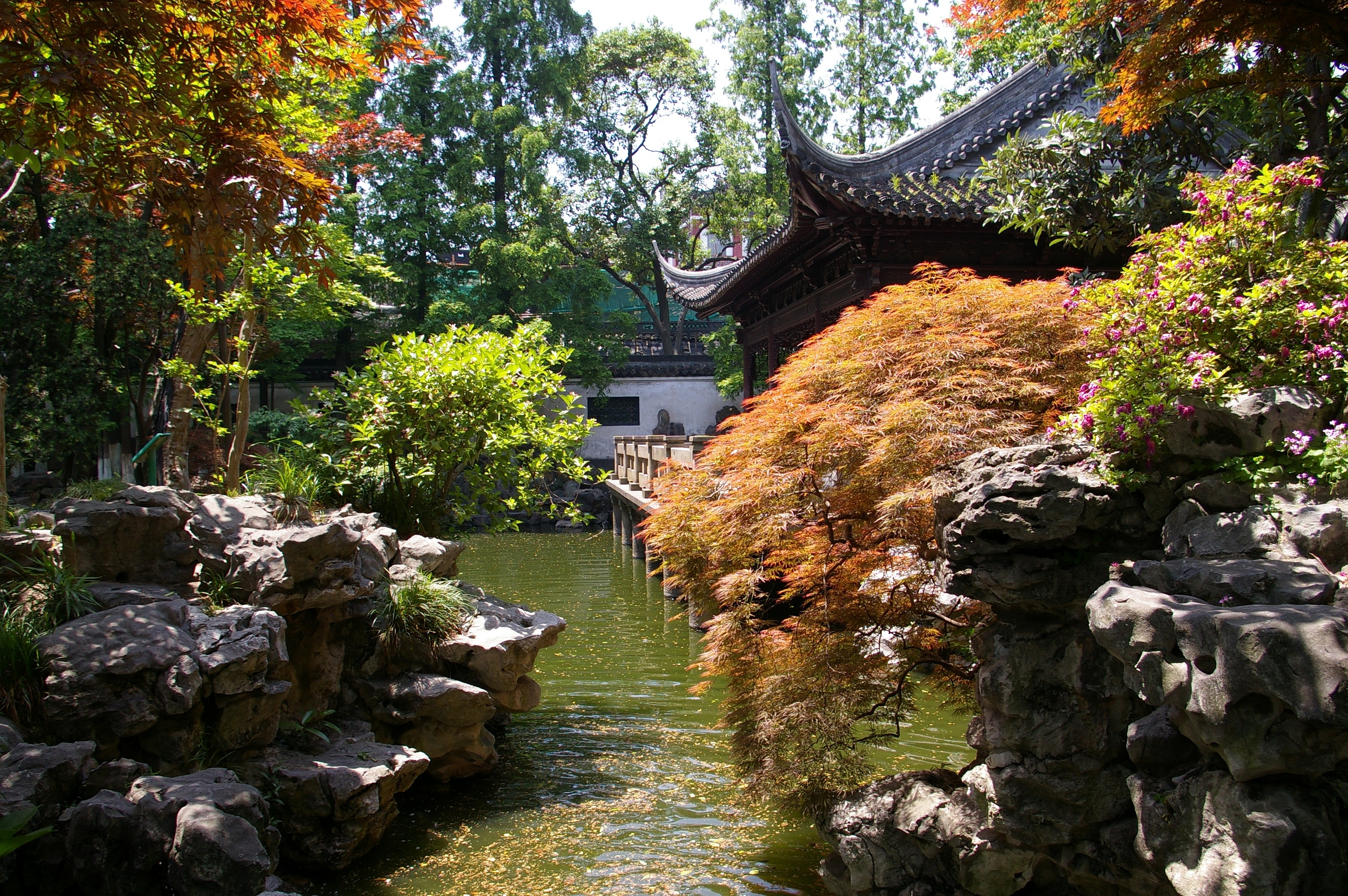
This picture of the Yuyuan Garden in Shanghai (created in 1559) shows all the elements of a classical Chinese garden – water, architecture, vegetation, and rocks.

This is a list of Chinese-style gardens both within China and elsewhere in the world.

== Greater China ==
This list is organized by region within the Greater China region, roughly following the structure laid out by Maggie Keswick in The Chinese Garden. The names of Chinese gardens are very problematic in English; this list aims to capture all the major variants, both in Chinese and in English.

=== North China ===
- Beijing area
  - Da Guan Yuan (Prospect Garden)
  - Ning Shou Yuan (Garden of the Qianlong Emperor; Garden of Tranquil Longevity)
  - Qu Yuan (Garden on Harmonious Interest)
  - Yu Hua Yuan (Imperial Palace Garden)
  - Taoranting Park (Carefree Pavilion Garden)
  - Zi Zhu Yuan (purple Bamboo Garden)

=== East China ===
City	Name	Pinyin	Chinese	Location	Address
Huzhou	Lesser Lotus Manor	Xiǎo lián zhuāng	小莲庄	30.8692°N 120.4295°E	166 Ren Rui Rd, Nanxun District (浙江省湖州市南浔镇人瑞路166号)
Nanjing	Xu Garden	Xù Yuán	煦园	32.045126°N 118.792347°E	
Nanjing	Zhan Yuan Garden	Zhān yuán	瞻園	32.022450°N 118.779776°E	秦淮区中华路465号
Shanghai	Zuibaichi	Zuìbáichí	醉白池	31.0024°N 121.2292°E	64 South Renmin Rd, Songjiang District (松江区人民南路64号)
Shanghai	Guyi Garden	Gǔyī Yuán	古漪园	31.2920°N 121.3166°E	218 Huyi Rd, Jiading District (嘉定区沪宜公路218号)
Shanghai	Garden of Autumn Vapors	Qiūxiá Pǔ	秋霞圃	31.3868°N 121.2529°E	314 E. Ave. Jiading District (嘉定区东大街314号)
Shanghai	Yuyuan Garden	Yù Yuán	豫园	31°13′45″N 121°29′15″E	132 Anren Rd, Luwan District (路132号)
Shanghai	Chenshan Garden		辰山	32°2′25″N 121°27′53″E	
Hangzhou	Mansion of the Guo Family	Guō zhuāng	郭庄	30.245458°N 120.125591°E	
Huai'an	Qing Yan Garden	Qīng Yàn Yuán	清晏园	33°35′10.9″N 119°1′9.5″E	
Ningbo	Tian Yi Ge	tiānyī gé	天一阁	29.872643°N 121.535506°E	
Shaoxing	Orchid Pavilion	Lántíng	兰亭	29.929467°N 120.496049°E	
Shaoxing	Shen Garden	Shén yuán	沈园	29.993231°N 120.585695°E	
Shaoxing	Green Vine Studio	Qīngténg shūwū	青藤书屋	29.997556°N 120.574463°E	
Wuxi	Jichang Garden	Jìchàng yuán	寄畅园	31.581863°N 120.266143°E	
Wuxi	Mei Yuan	méi yuán	梅园	31.554253°N 120.218548°E	
Wuxi	Li's Garden	Lí yuán	蠡园	31.519540°N 120.254588°E	(市辖区环湖路1号)
Yangzhou	Geyuan Garden	Gè Yuán	个园	32.402015°N 119.438148°E	
Yangzhou	He Garden	Hé Yuán	何园	32.385615°N 119.448504°E	
Suzhou	Garden of Cultivation	Yì Pǔ	艺圃	31°18′54.90″N 120°36′17.00″E	
Suzhou	Lingering Garden	Liú Yuán	留园	31°19′03.10″N 120°35′17.20″E	
Suzhou	Humble Administrator's Garden	Zhuōzhèng Yuán	拙政园	31°19′33.44″N 120°37′28.74″E	
Suzhou	Master of the Nets Garden	Wǎngshī Yuán	网师园	31°18′01.20″N 120°37′47.60″E	
Suzhou	Mountain Villa with Embracing Beauty	Huánxiù Shānzhuāng	环秀山庄	31°18′47.40″N 120°36′32.04″E	
Suzhou	Canglang Pavilion	Cānglàng Tíng	沧浪亭	31°17′47.57″N 120°37′17.46″E	
Suzhou	Lion Grove Garden	Shīzǐ Lín	狮子林	31°19′23.60″N 120°37′30.20″E	
Suzhou	Couple's Retreat Garden	Ŏu Yuán	耦园	31°19′05.90″N 120°38′04.30″E	
Suzhou	Retreat & Reflection Garden	Tuìsī Yuán	退思园	31.159912°N 120.716174°E	
Suzhou	Yiyuan Garden	Yí yuán	怡园	31.309598°N 120.617068°E	

- Shexian
  - Xin'an Bei Yuan (Xin'an Garden of Stelai)
- Suzhou
  - He Yuan (Crane Garden)
  - Qushui Garden
  - Xi Yuan (Western Garden)
- Jiangsu
  - Yangzhou
    - Ping Shan Tang (Hall Level with the Mountains)
    - Pian Shi Shan Fang (Sliver of Rock Mountain Cottage)
    - Yechun Garden

=== West China ===
- Xi'an
  - Huaqing Pool

=== Southwest China ===
- Sichuan
  - Chengdu
    - Du Fu Cao Tang (Thatched Hut of Du Fu)
- Yunnan
  - Kunming
    - Cui Hu (翠湖公园; "Green Lake Park"; 20th century)

=== South China ===
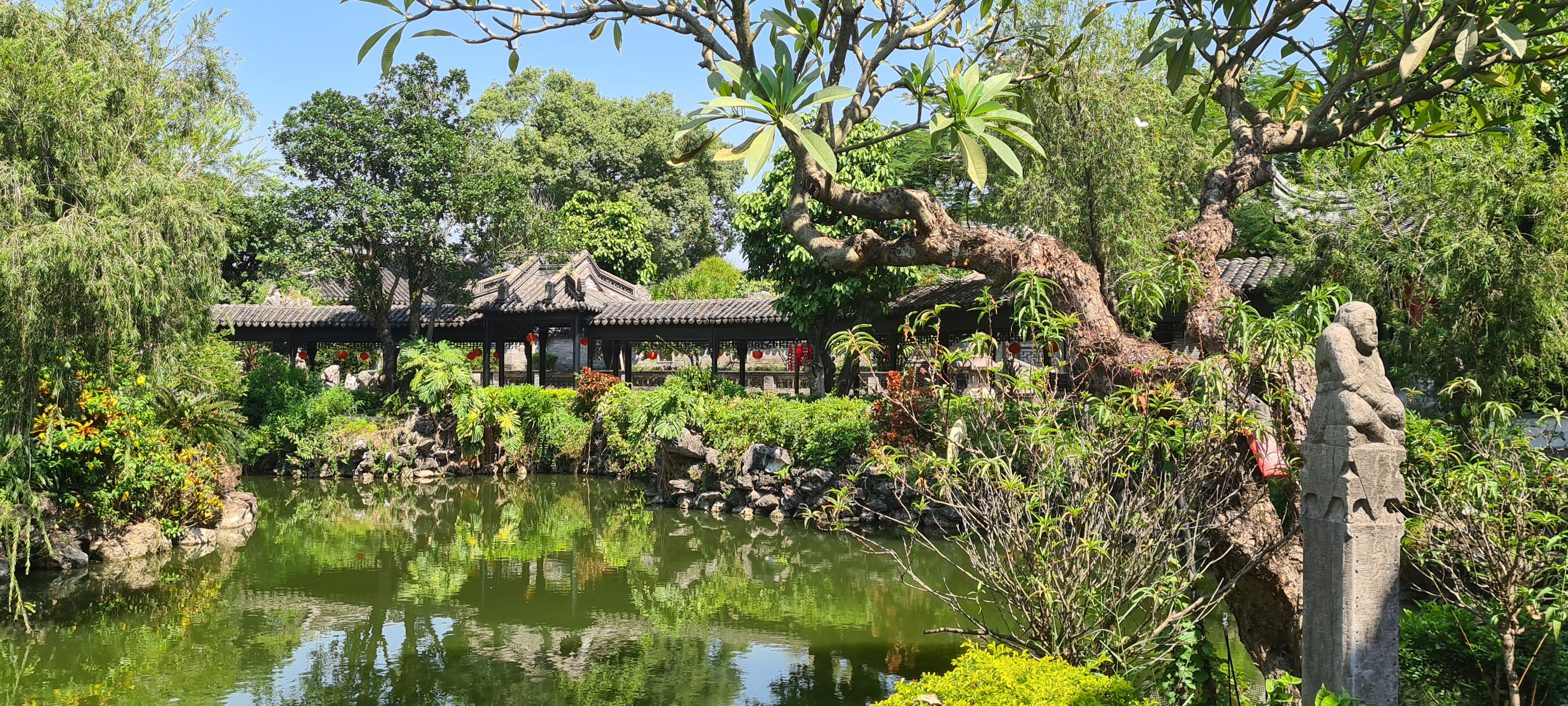
Water view in Zhan Yuan (詹园)

- Guangdong
  - Guangzhou
    - Baomo Yuan (宝墨园; "Bao Zheng's Inkstone Garden"; late Qing, destroyed 1957, rebuilt 1995; 6.66ha)
    - Lan Pu (兰圃; "Orchid Nursery"; 1957; 3.9ha)
    - Nanyue Yuan (南粤苑; "Southern Yue Garden"; 2009; 6.66ha)
    - Yu Yin Shan Fang (余荫山房; "Mountain Cottage of Abundant Shade"; 1867; 0.16ha)
  - Dongguan
    - Ke Yuan (可園; "Satisfying Garden"; 1850; 0.54ha)
  - Foshan
    - Liang Yuan (梁园; "Garden of the Liang Family"; 1840; 2.1ha), also known as the Qun Xing Caotang ("Thatched Hut of the Assembled Stars")
  - Shunde
    - Qing Hui Yuan (清晖园; "Garden of Pure Splendor"; 1800; 0.8ha)
  - Zhongshan
    - Zhan Yuan (詹园; "Zhan's Garden"; 1998)
- Macau
  - Lou Lim Ieoc Garden
  - Comendador Ho Yin Garden
- Hong Kong
  - Hang Hau Man Kuk Lane Park
  - Hollywood Road Park (荷李活道公園)
  - Kowloon Park (partial)
  - Kowloon Walled City Park (九龍寨城公園)
  - Lai Chi Kok Park
  - Lok Kwan Street Park
  - Nan Lian Garden (南蓮園池)
  - Sha Tin Park (沙田公園)

=== Taiwan ===
- Hsinchu
  - Nanyuan (Chinese: 新竹南園)
- Taichung
  - Wufeng Lin Family Mansion and Garden (Chinese: 霧峰林家宅園)
- Tainan
  - Tainan Wu Garden (Chinese: 吳園)
- Taipei
  - Taipei Botanical Garden (Chinese: 台北植物園)
  - Zhishan Garden (Chinese: 至善園) in National Palace Museum
  - Lin Family Mansion and Garden(Chinese: 板橋林家花園)
  - Shuangxi Park and Chinese Garden (Chinese: 雙溪公園)
  - Shilin Official Residence (Chinese: 士林官邸)

== Outside Greater China ==
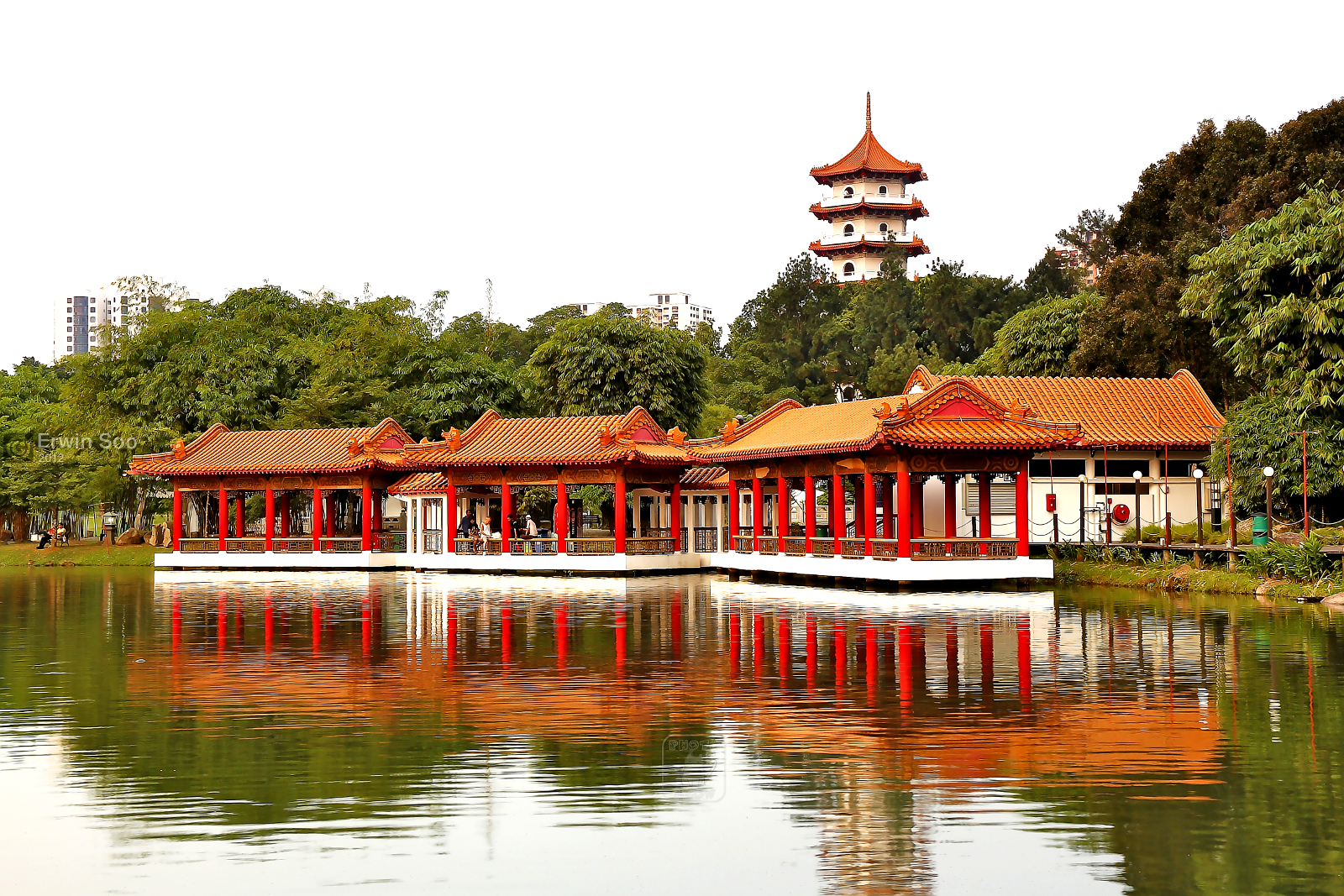
Chinese Garden, Singapore

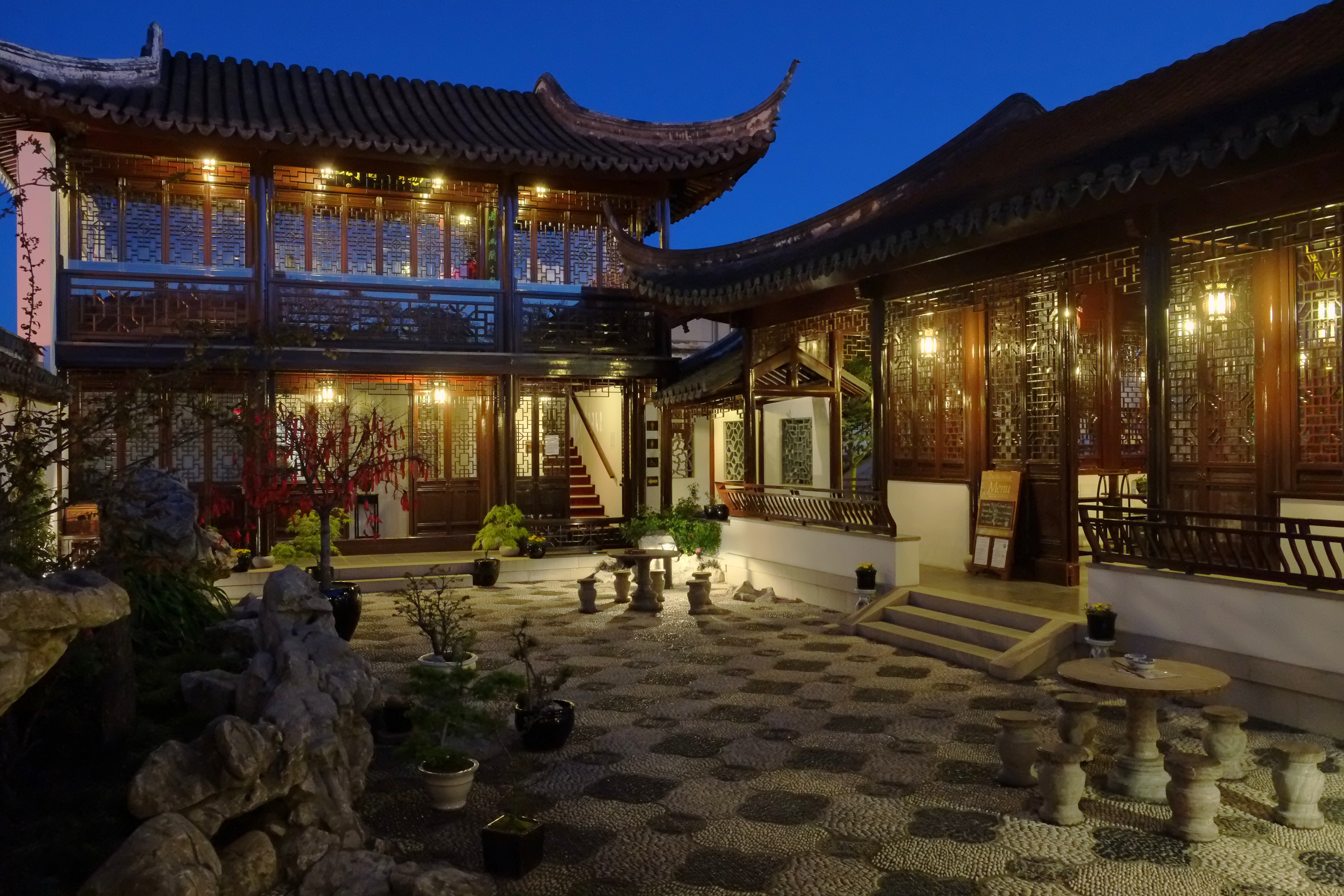
Dunedin Chinese Garden, Dunedin, New Zealand

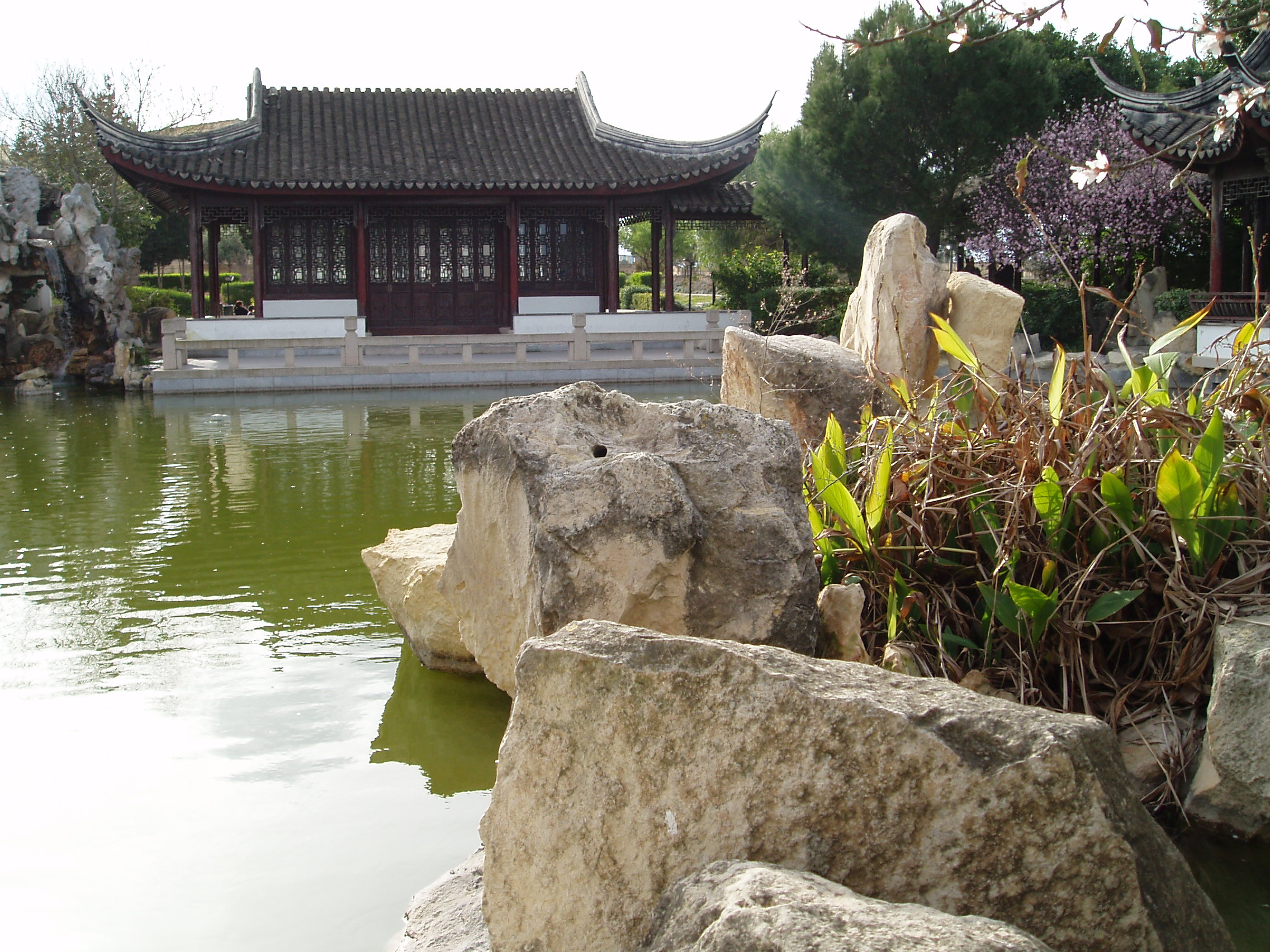
Chinese Garden of Serenity, Malta

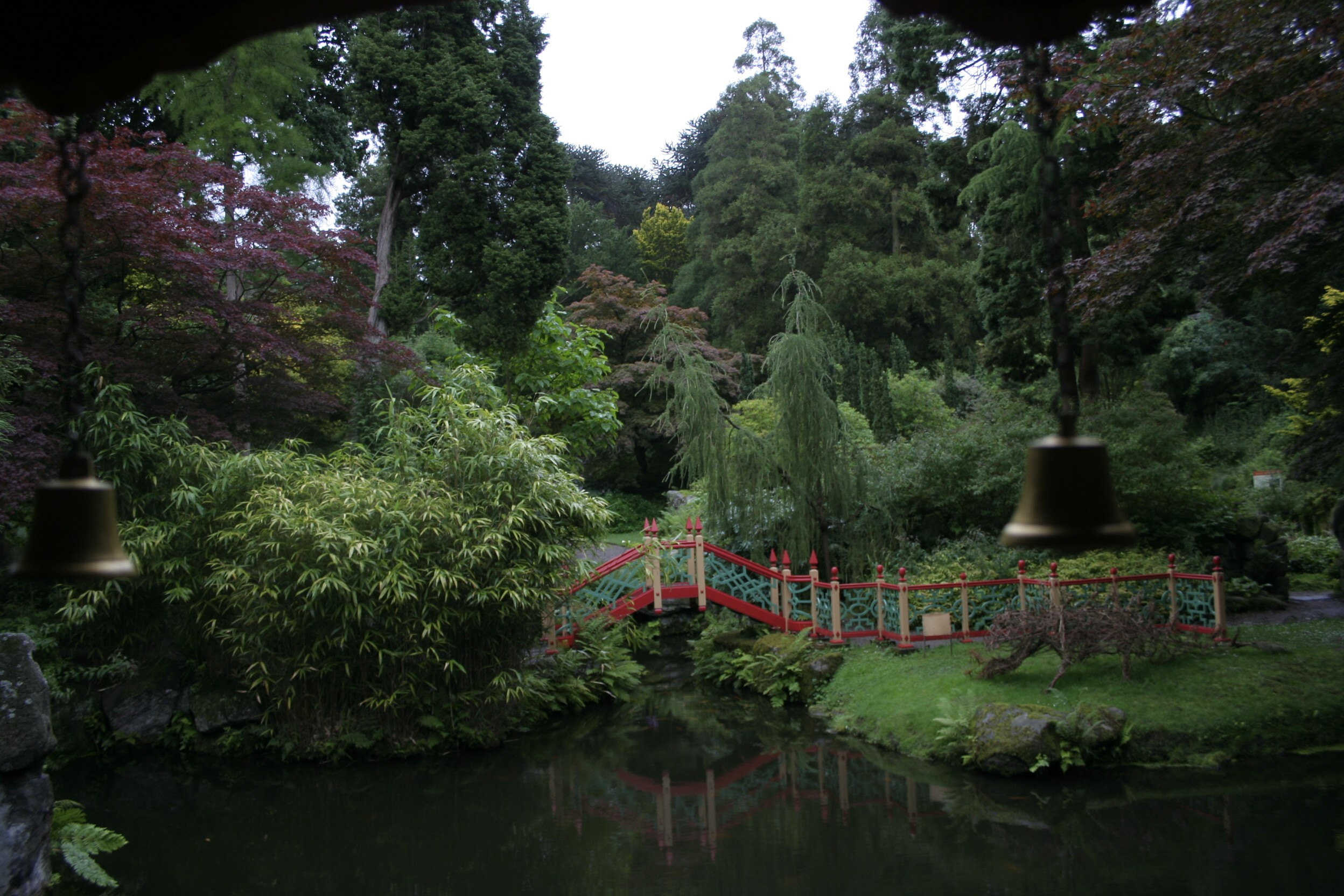
Chinese Garden, Biddulph Grange, England

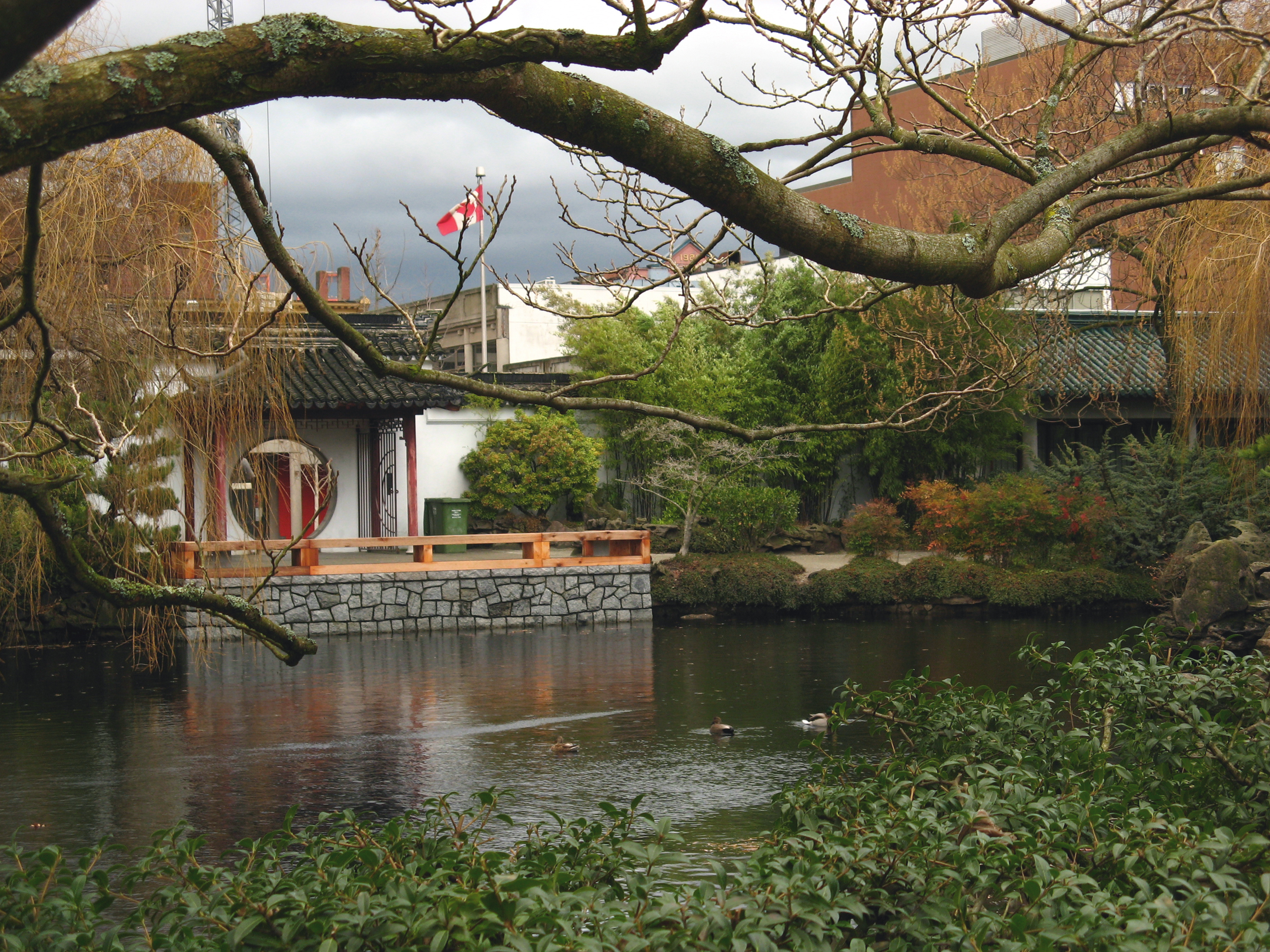
Dr. Sun Yat-Sen Classical Chinese Garden, Vancouver, British Columbia, Canada

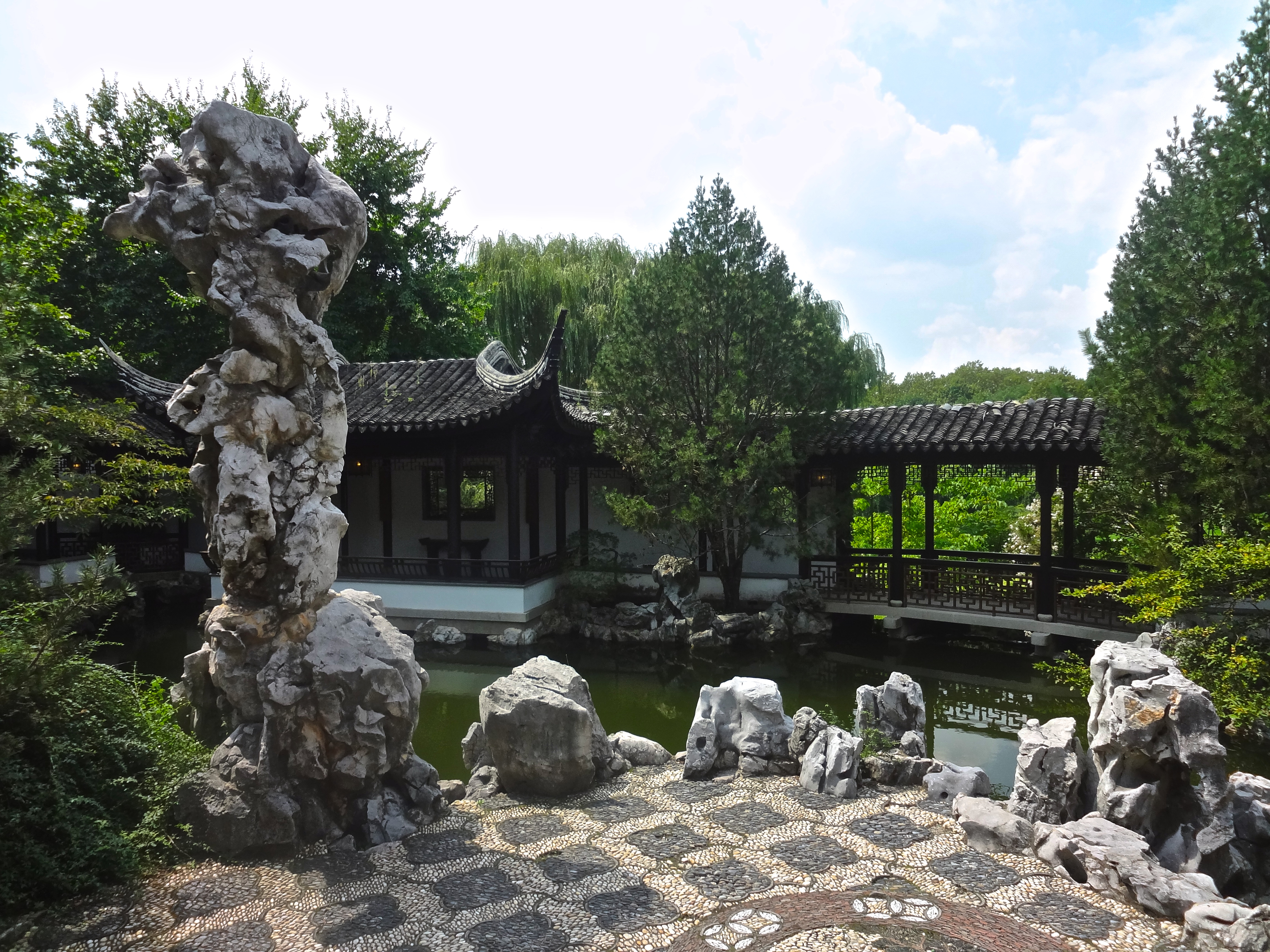
The New York Chinese Scholar's Garden, Staten Island, New York

=== Asia ===
Japan

- Enchoen, Yurihama, Tottori, Japan
- Fukushūen (Fuzhou Garden) in Naha, Okinawa, Japan

Philippines

- Chinese Garden, Rizal Park in Manila, Philippines

Singapore

- Chinese Garden, Singapore in Singapore

=== Australasia ===
Australia

- Chinese Garden of Friendship in Chinatown, Sydney, Australia

New Zealand

- Dunedin Chinese Garden (Lan Yuan) in Dunedin, New Zealand
- Scholar's Chinese Garden in Hamilton, New Zealand

https://hamiltongardens.co.nz/collections/paradise-collection/chinese-scholars-garden/

=== Europe ===
Germany

- Chinesischer Garten in Frankfurt, Germany
- Chinesischer Garten in Berlin, Germany
- Der Chinesische Garten in Mannheim, Germany
- Qian Yuan in the Botanischer Garten der Ruhr-Universität Bochum, Bochum, Germany
- Garten der schönen Melodie in Stuttgart, Germany

Netherlands

- Hortus Haren in Haren, Groningen

Malta

- Chinese Garden of Serenity in Santa Luċija, Malta

Switzerland

- Chinese Garden, Zürich, Switzerland

United Kingdom

- Woburn Abbey, Bedfordshire
- Tatton Park, Cheshire
- Fanhams Hall, Hertfordshire
- Kew Gardens, London
- Biddulph Grange, Staffordshire
- Beggar's Knoll, Wiltshire

=== North America ===
Canada

- The Chinese Garden at the Montréal Botanical Garden in Montreal, Quebec, Canada
- Dr. Sun Yat-Sen Classical Chinese Garden in Vancouver, British Columbia, Canada

United States

- The New York Chinese Scholar's Garden 寄興園 in Staten Island, New York
- Lan Su Chinese Garden in Portland, Oregon
- Liu Fang Yuan 流芳園 or the Garden of Flowing Fragrance, Chinese Garden at the Huntington Library in San Marino, California
- Seattle Chinese Garden in Seattle, Washington
- The Astor Court in the Metropolitan Museum of Art in New York
- The Margaret Grigg Nanjing Friendship Garden in the Missouri Botanical Garden in St. Louis, Missouri
- Robert D. Ray Asian Gardens in Des Moines, Iowa
- Innisfree Garden in Millbrook, New York
- Pagoda & Oriental Garden in Norfolk, Virginia

== See also ==
- Chinese garden
- List of botanical gardens in China
- List of Japanese gardens in the United States
