= Garden of Pleasance =

Classical Chinese garden

Coordinates: 31.309598°N 120.617068°E

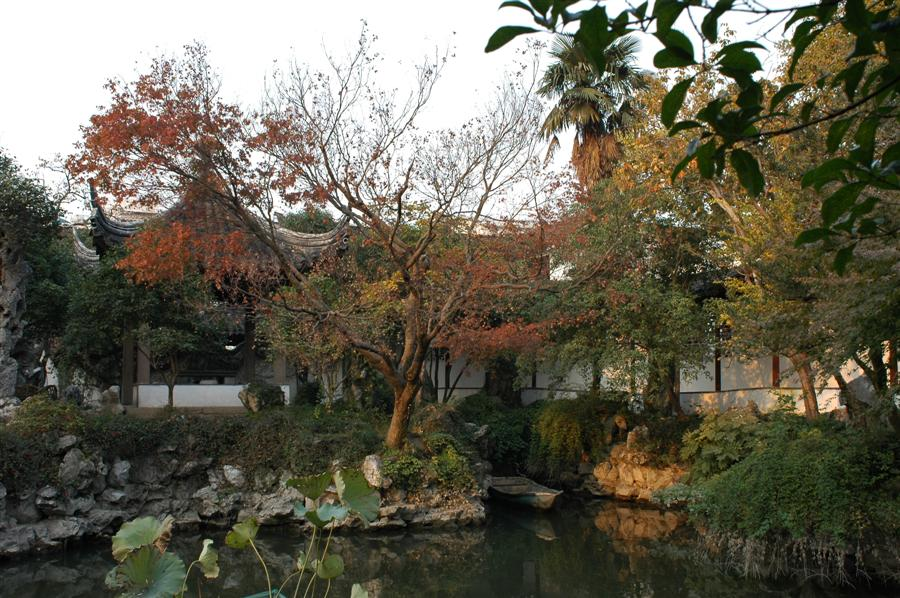
Garden of Pleasance

The Garden of Pleasance (Chinese: 怡园; pinyin: Yíyuán; Suzhou Wu, Wugniu: Yi^{2} yoe^{2}, Wu Chinese pronunciation: [ɦi ɦyø]), or Yi Yuan is a classical Chinese garden located in Suzhou, Jiangsu province, China.

== History ==
The garden was built in the late Qing Dynasty in late 19th century, and is the most recently built Suzhou gardens. The garden was originally a private garden built by Go Wenbin, an official of the early years of the Guangxu Reign of the late Qing Dynasty.

It has been described as one of the most representative Suzhou gardens, comprising a garden, a lotus pond, residences, artificial villages and ancestral halls. Because the garden incorporates all the elements of the various Suzhou gardens, it is sometimes regarded as an agglomeration of Suzhou's garden culture.

== See also ==
- List of Chinese gardens
