= Qiuxia Garden =

Garden in Jiading, in the North of Shanghai

Coordinates: 31.388804°N 121.24854°E

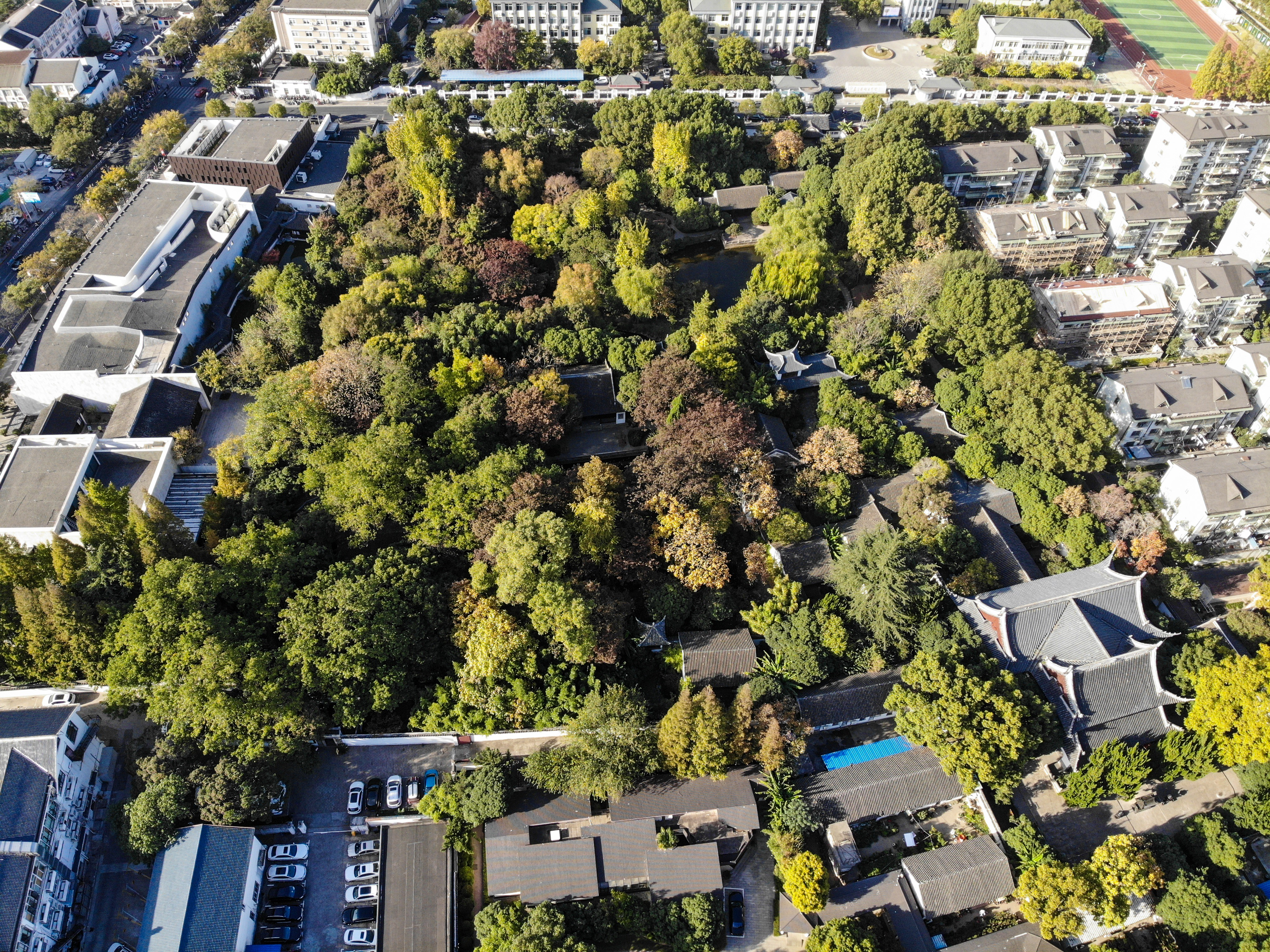

Location:No. 314, East Main Street, Jiading District, Shanghai/Qi Liang Lu, Jiading, Shanghai

Qiuxia Pu or Qiuxia Garden (秋霞圃) is a garden in Jiading, in the North of Shanghai. Built in the 15th century, it served as the private garden of Gong Hong (龚弘, ca 1450-1526), the head of the Ministry of Works. It is located near the Jiadingzhou Bridge Old Street.

It is one of the four famous gardens in Shanghai. This unique style of Ming Dynasty garden, by three private gardens Ming Dynasty Guoshi Garden, Shenshi Garden, Jinshi Garden and Guo Temple (Chenghuang Temple) merged. There are four scenic spots: Taohuatan (formerly Qiu's Garden), Ningxiage (formerly Shen's Garden), Qingjingtang (formerly Jin's Garden) and Daimiao Scenic Area. The maple trees around Qingjingtang pond in the end of November and early December of each year are colorful.

== See also ==
- List of Chinese gardens
