= Li Yuan (disambiguation) =

Li Yuan is the personal name of Emperor Gaozu of Tang, founder of the Tang dynasty.

Li Yuan or Yuan Li may also refer to:

== People surnamed Li ==
- Li Yuan (ROC politician) (1879–after 1935), Chinese politician and mayor of Beiping between 1925 and 1927
- Li Yuan (PRC general) (1917–2008), Chinese general and politician
- Li Yuan (writer) (born 1951), Taiwanese writer and politician
- Li Yuan (snooker player) (born 1989), Chinese snooker player
- Li Yuan (basketball) (born 2000), Chinese basketball player

== People surnamed Yuan ==
- Yuan Li (journalist) (born c. 1972), Chinese-American journalist
- Yuan Li (born 1973), Chinese actress
- Yuan Li (fencer) (born 1978), Chinese female fencer

== See also ==
- Liyuan (disambiguation)
- Yuanli, Miaoli, a township in Miaoli, Taiwan
