= He Garden =

Park in Yangzhou, China

He Garden 何园
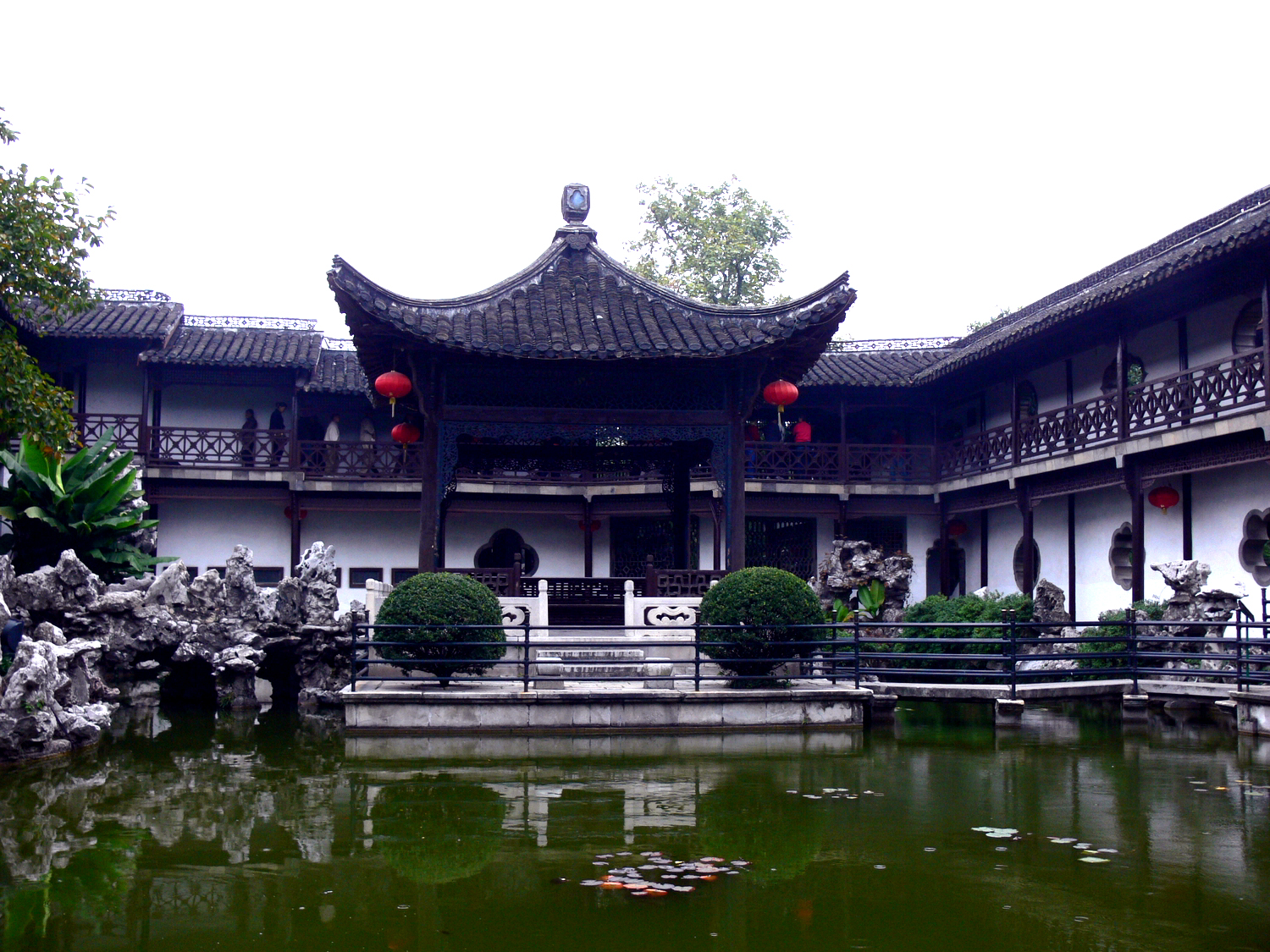
- He Garden
- Interactive map of He Garden 何园
- Type: Historic Gardens
- Location: Yangzhou, Jiangsu
- Coordinates: 32°23′08″N 119°26′55″E
- Created: 1883
- Designer: Shi Tao
- Website: http://www.he-garden.net

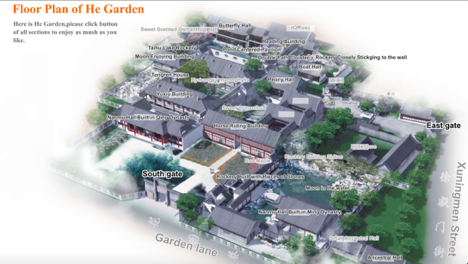

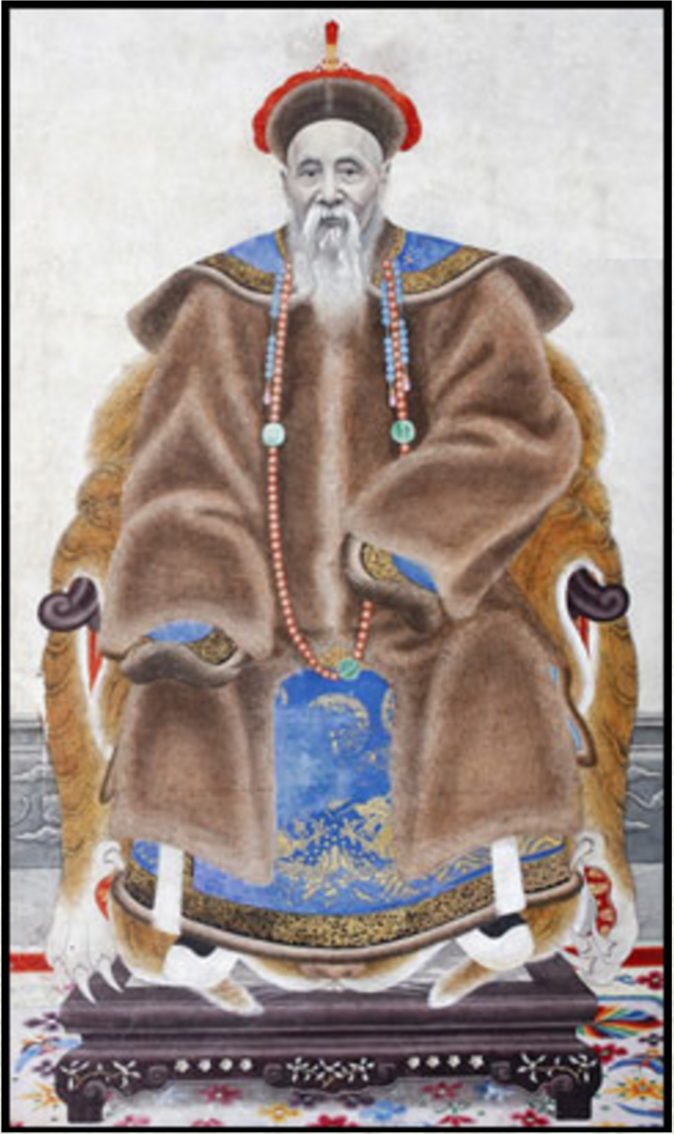

He Garden (simplified Chinese: 何园; traditional Chinese: 何園; pinyin: Hé Yuán) is a park in Yangzhou, Jiangsu province. He Family Garden, also known as Jixiao Villa, is the last but best work among the private gardens in Yangzhou. Located on Xuningmen Street, it is a heritage site under state protection and a national AAAA-rated tourist attraction. It is the best-known private garden of the late Qing dynasty, and is one of 20 first-class key parks in China. He Garden is considered a must-see place for tourists who travel in Yangzhou.

== Name ==
The creator of the garden, He Zhidao, named the garden Mountain Villa for Ease of Singing (borrowed from two lines of the poem On Returning Home, written by Tao Yuanming). Since the owner was named "He", the garden was called "He Yuan".

== Family Affairs & National Affairs ==
=== About the Master ===
Born in 1835 in Wangjiang, Anhui, He Zhidao (a 19th-century Chinese envoy to France) was appointed as the governor of Hangyang Prefecture, Huang-zhou Prefecture and De`an Prefecture, and supervisor of Jianghan Barrier. He was also awarded to be a top ranking official of the consulting minister and later to be grand minister of consultation. National Affairs Crisis

Since the country was surrounded by dangers then, He Zhidao could do nothing for his patriotism and anticipations to help the country become stronger and had to resign in middle age.

=== Chizhi University ===
Subject to his last wish, He Zhidao's descendants established Chizhi University with his remaining capital in 1924, over 40 years after his death.

After its establishment, Chizhi University cultivated a lot of ambitious youths who made great contributions for the country.

== History ==
The He Garden is a typical residential garden, built in 1883 during the reign of the Guangxu Emperor in the Qing dynasty. The garden was built on the old site of the Garden of Double Pagoda Trees, with one pagoda tree still remaining in He Garden. The creator was He Weijian, also known as He Zhidao. With his father's approval, he moved to Yangzhou, bought the site of the former Sliced Stone Mountain Villa, rebuilt it, and expanded it.

In 1937, the Japanese invaded China, occupying the three northeast provinces and a lot of China. Several injured soldiers lived in He Garden.

In 1988, He Garden was awarded Major Historical and Cultural Site Protected at the National Level by the state council, the third given out, together with Ge Garden.

In 1989, Pian Shi Shan Fang was repaired.

In 2005, He Garden was referred to as "the best classic Chinese garden in Qing Dynasty" for its combination of western architecture and the brilliant features of a private garden in Jiangnan by Luo Zhewen (a leading academic on classical Chinese gardens).

== Features ==
The He Garden is a large private garden with a residence. The garden covers an area of 14,000 square metres (17,000 sq yd), of which 7,000 m^{2} (8,400 sq yd) are cultivated. Even though the garden is highly cultivated, visitors do not feel cramped thanks to the garden's layout. Around the garden there are only buildings, without mountains or running water. Absorbing the essence of traditional Chinese gardening, He Garden introduced western landscape architecture and has established its own style. Chinese experts on ancient gardens have long praised the art employed in building He Garden, calling it "a single case of gardens in South of the Yangtze River area".

The garden comprises three parts (the west and east gardens, the residential area and courtyard, and the mountain villa) which are arranged in a chain. With both Chinese and Western features, the garden can be used as both a residence and a scenic spot. Its designer endeavored to create an ideal residence; their efforts are included in the book, The Wonders of Yangzhou City. He Garden is recognized as "the first celebrated garden in the city after the Xianfeng and Tongzhi emperors".

The combination of western architectural features, and influence from Chinese royal gardens and Jiangnan private gardens, makes the garden feel both historic and modern.

== Famous views ==
- Yuxiu Building

- Boat Hall

- Double-Path Cloister

- Butterfly Hall

- Rockery Built with Pieces of Stones

- Pond-Centered Pavilion

- Rockery Closely Sticking to the Wall

== Photos ==
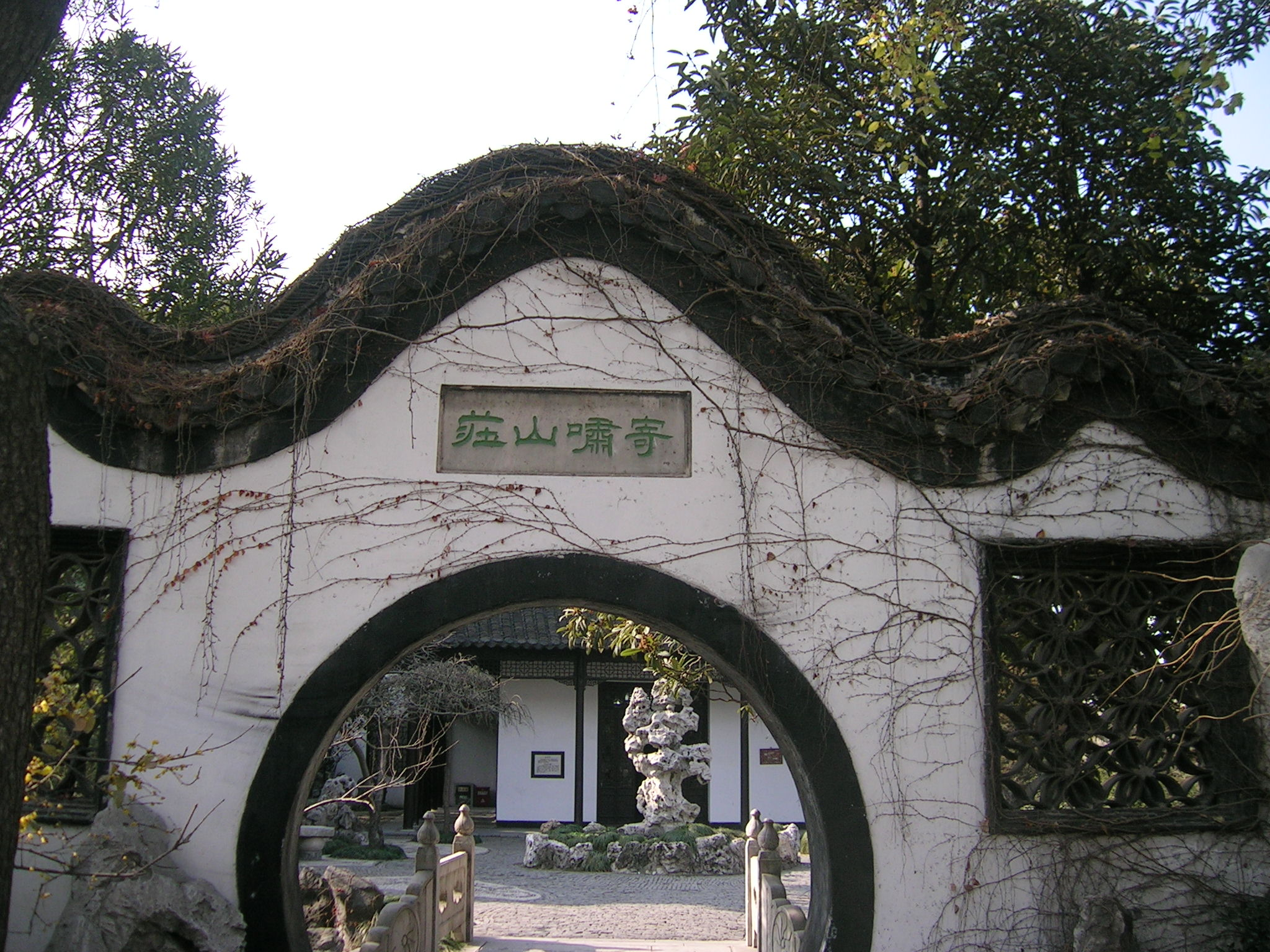
Jixiao village

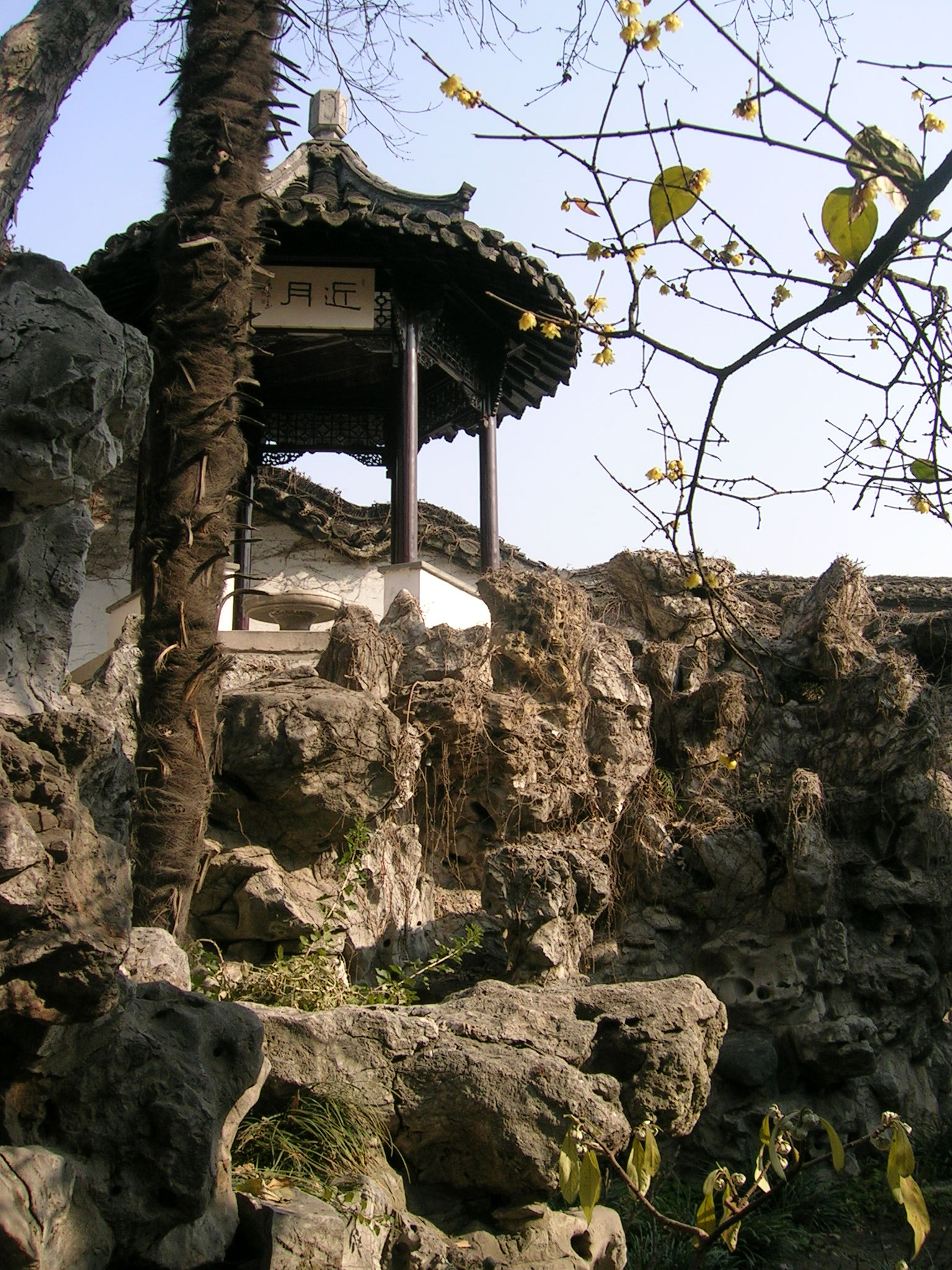
Jinyue pavilion

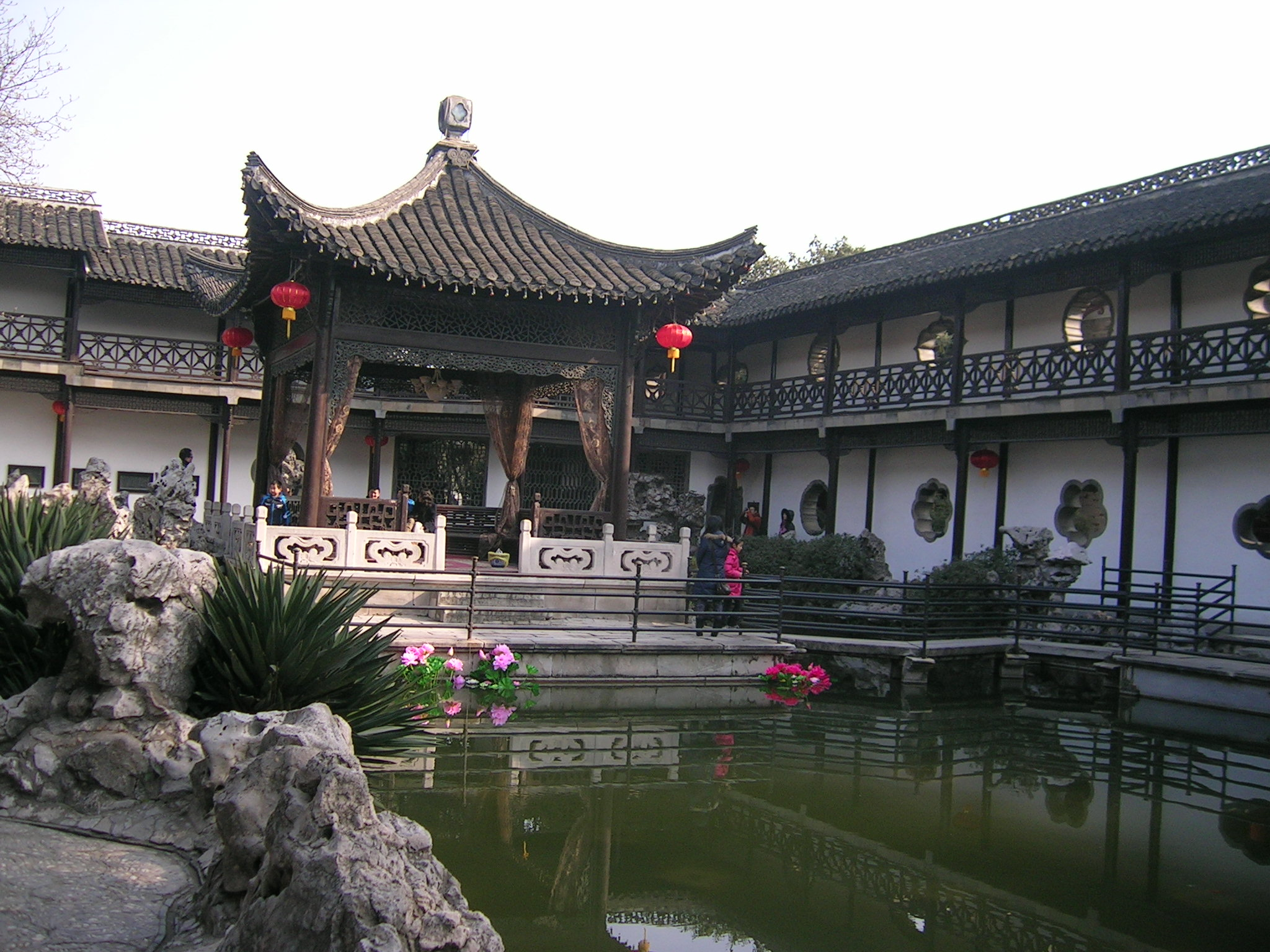
Shuixin pavilion

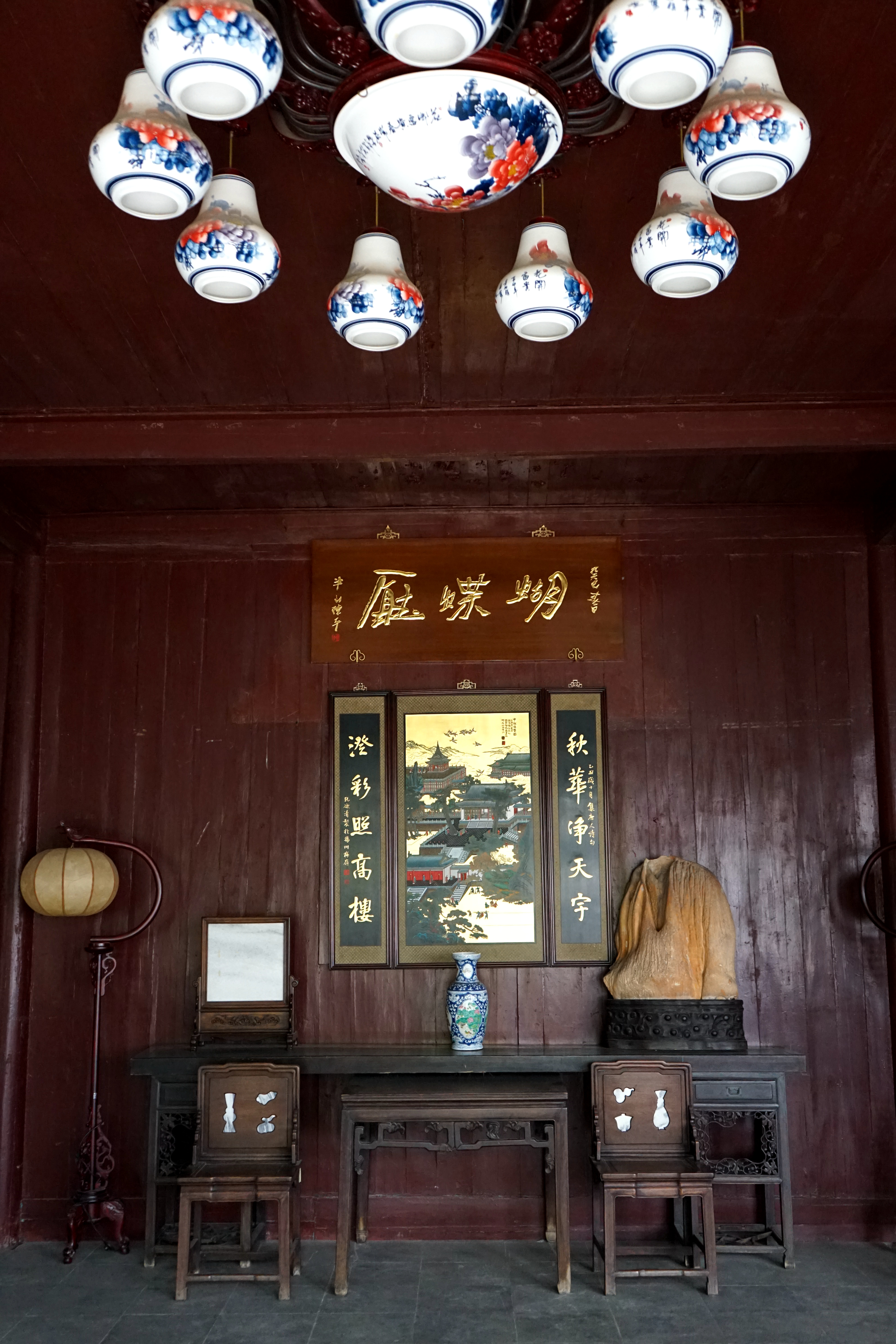
Butterfly Hall

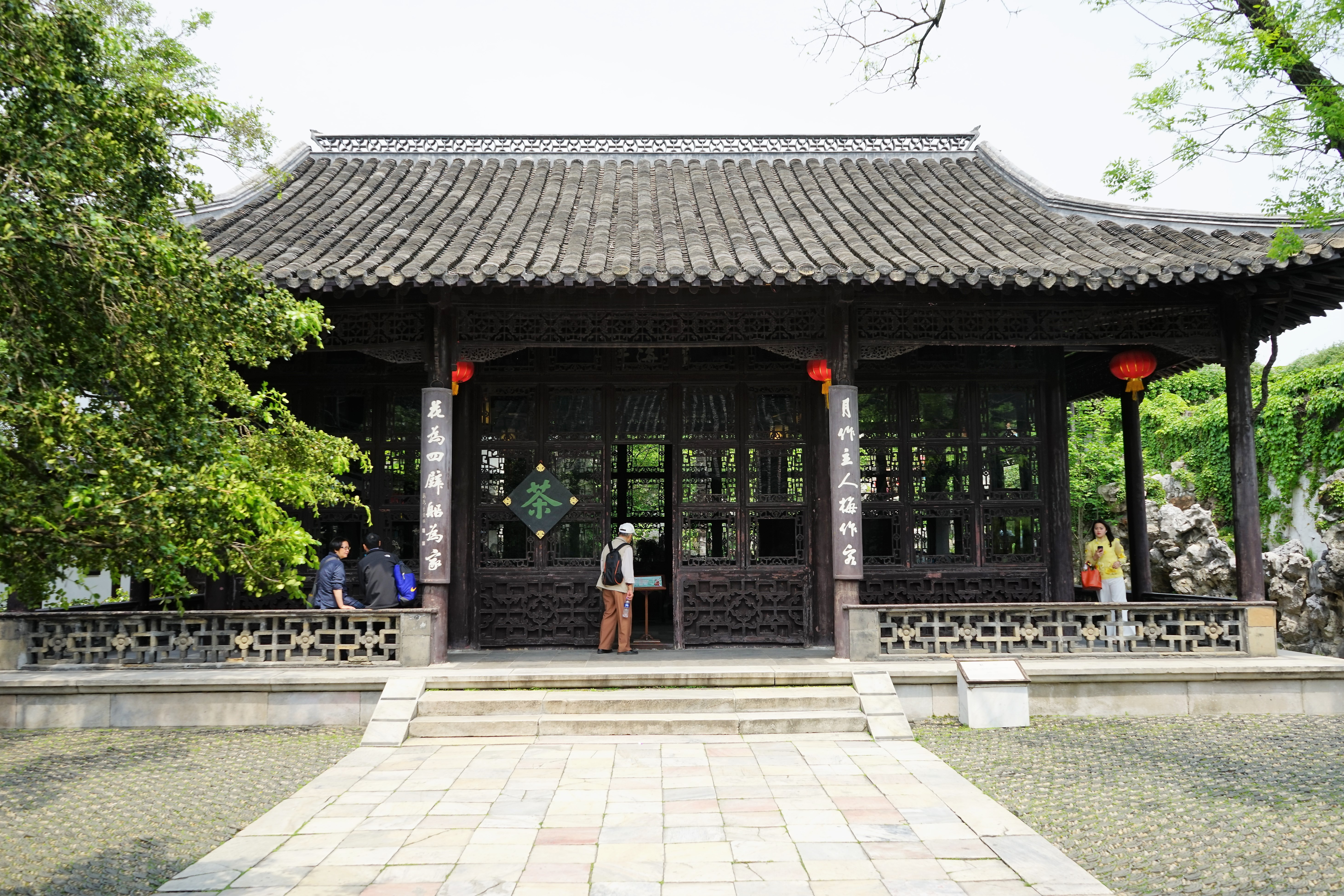
Boat Hall

== See also ==
- List of Chinese gardens
- Yangzhou
- Ge Garden
- Slender West Lake
- Dongguan Street
- Daming temple
