= Liyuan (garden) =

Chinese garden on the shore of Li Lake

Coordinates: 31.519540°N 120.254588°E

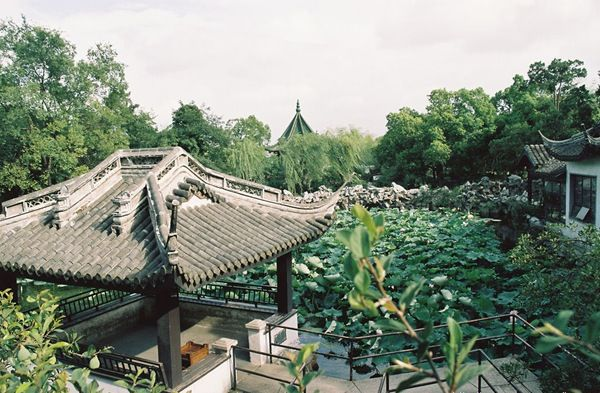

Liyuan (Chinese: 蠡园) or Li Garden is a Chinese garden on the shore of Li Lake. It is named after Fan Li, a senior minister of the state of Yue who retired to his hometown after conquering the state of Wu. One day he went boating on what was then called Wuli Lake with one of the most beautiful women in ancient China named Xi Shi. Afterwards he decided to name the lake after himself, calling it Li Lake. The garden built on the shore of Li Lake was called Li Garden.

== See also ==
- List of Chinese gardens
