= Zhan Yuan =

Garden in Guangdong, China

- 詹园 (Chinese)
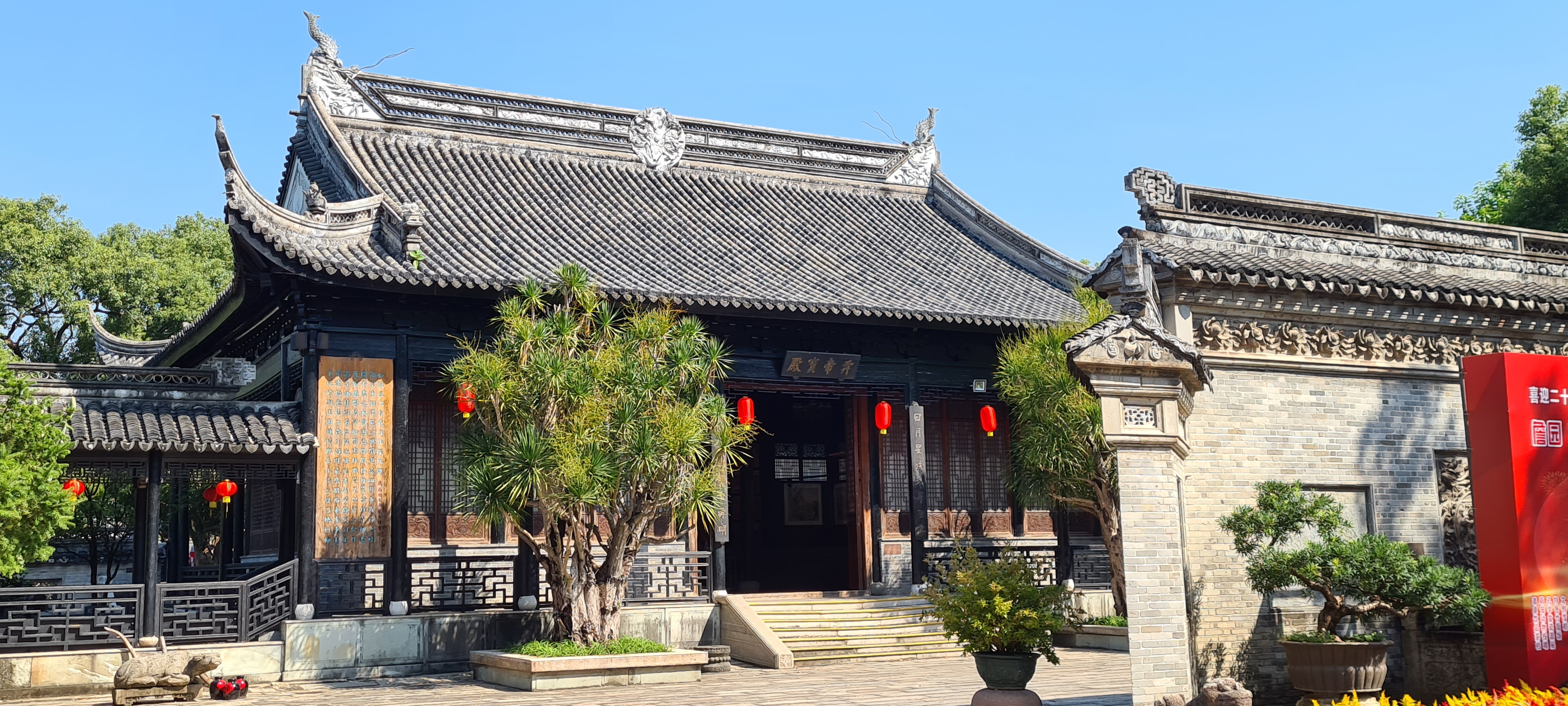
- Type: A Chinese garden executed in a Suzhou and Hangzhou-derived style.
- Location: Beside Highway 105, Beitai village, Zhongshan (中山市南区北台村105国道旁)
- Coordinates: 22.4357°N 113.3316°E
- Area: 100 acres (40 ha)
- Established: 1998 (public since 2003)
- Open: 8:00-17:30

Zhan Yuan (simplified Chinese: 詹园; traditional Chinese: 詹園; pinyin: Zhānyuán; Jyutping: Zim^{1}jyun^{4}), also known as Zhongshan Grand Mansion Gate, is a modern Chinese garden designed in a Suzhou and Hangzhou-derived style spanning the Beixi River (北溪河) near Huzhou Mountain (湖洲山) in the south of Zhongshan in Guangdong Province, China. At multiple hectares it is billed as the largest private Chinese garden in the Lingnan area of southern China, and is officially classed as a National AAAA class tourist attraction, the second highest classification.

== Conception ==
The garden is said to have been inspired by Suzhou and Hangzhou classical Chinese gardens combined with the garden's situation and local Cantonese water townships. It is not fully traditional, for example Australian Callistemon dominate in place of willows, and ornamental imports such as Ravenala madagascariensis are broadly distributed.

== Layout ==
The garden is split by the Beixi River in to two sections, the southern section and the northern section, joined by a covered bridge. The southern section contains substantial architectural and water features. The northern section contains smaller gardens, pavilions and courtyard architecture. Both sections contain penjing.

== History ==
The garden, over 100 acres (40 ha) was established 1998 by Huang Yuanxin (黃遠新) for his aged mother, and in 2003 opened to the public. The garden was later expanded by constructing the second northern section, gifted to his father. The two sections are linked by a covered bridge.

== Gallery ==
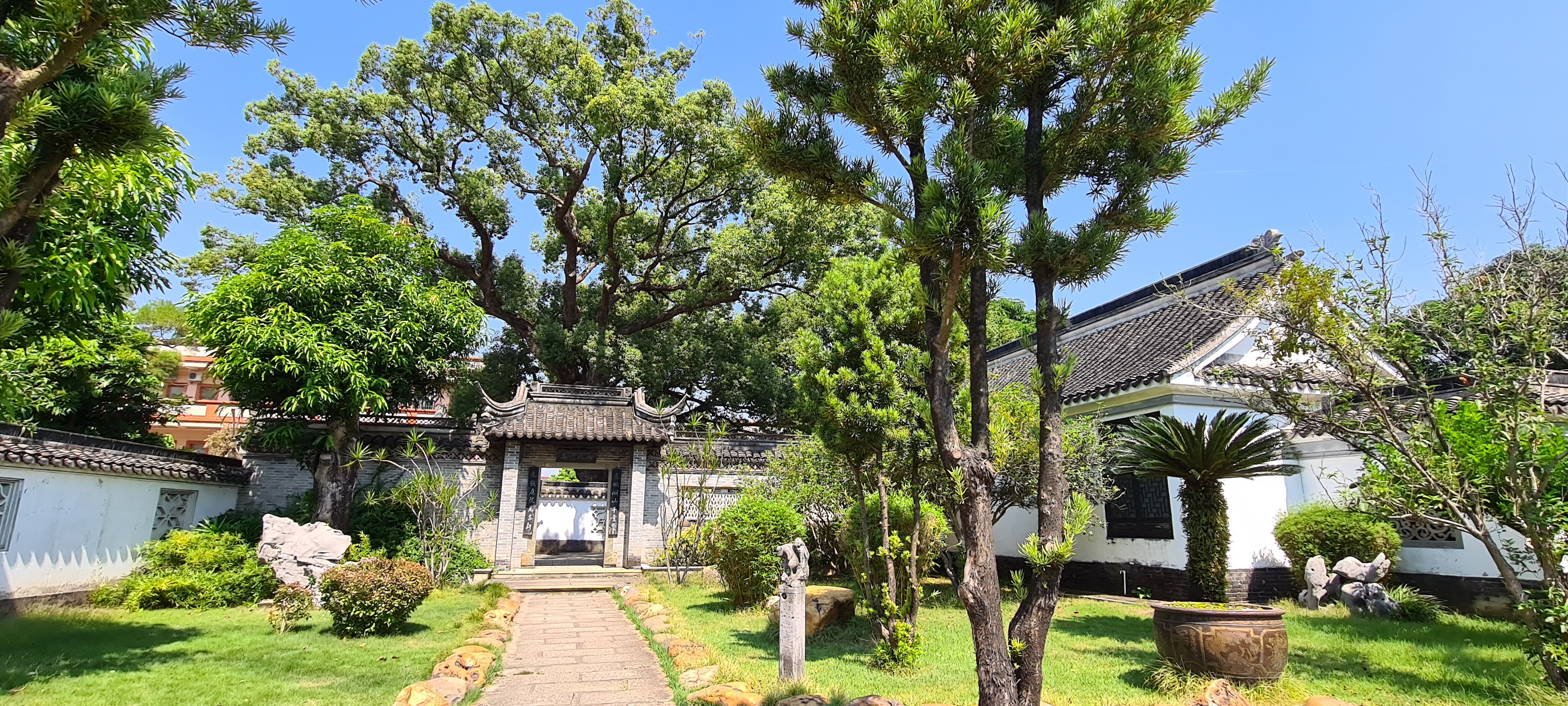
Northwest gate, view northward toward exterior.

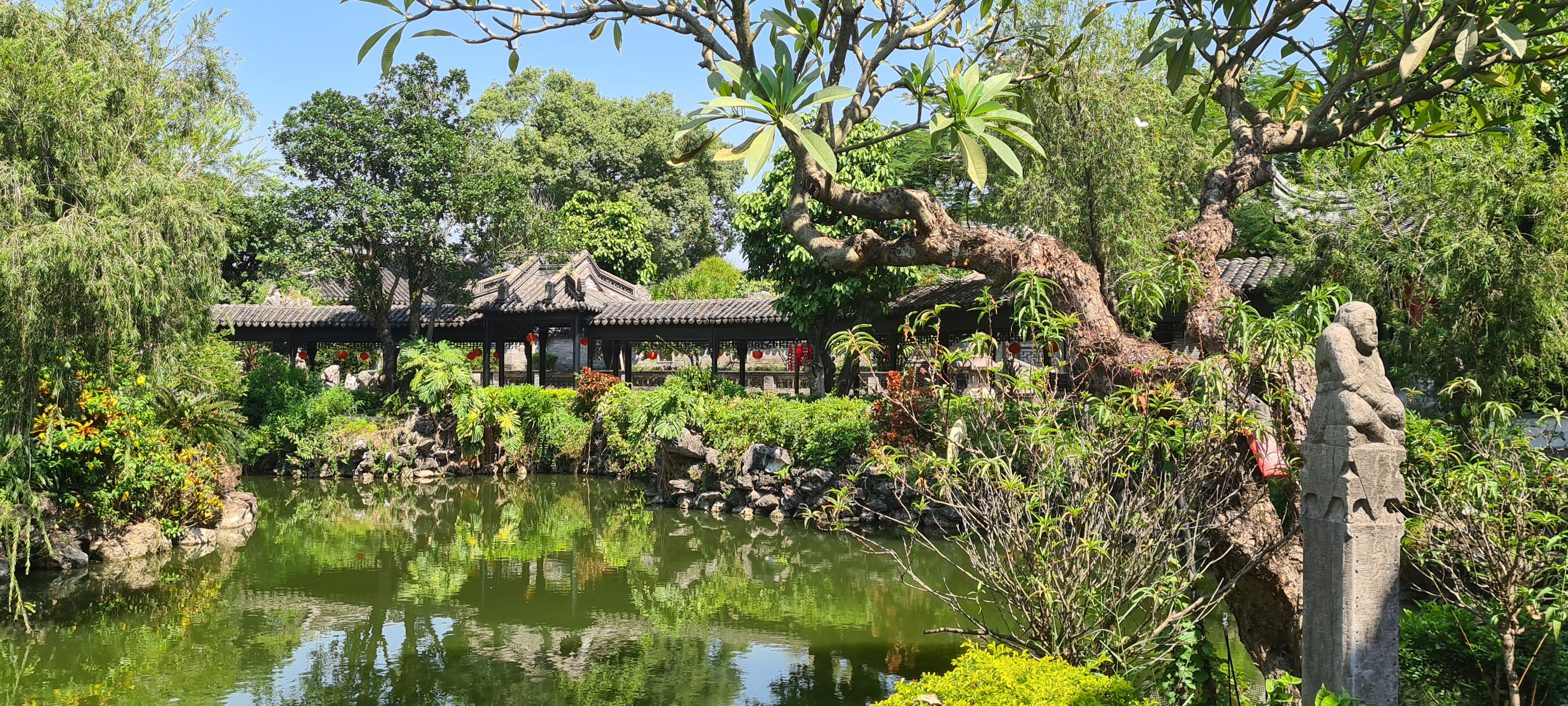
Water view in the southern part of the garden, featuring reclaimed sculpture.

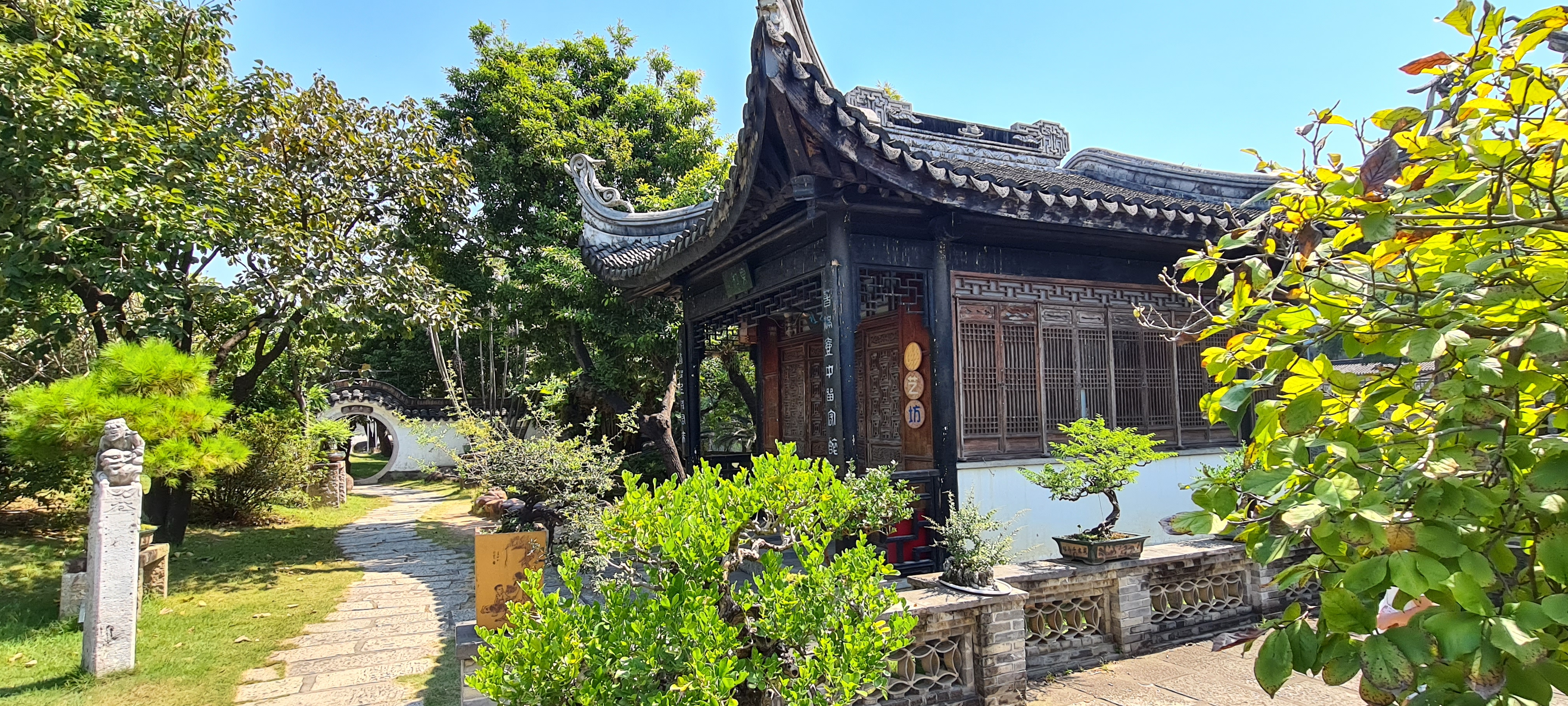
Eastward view in the northern part of the garden with a moon gate visible in the distance.

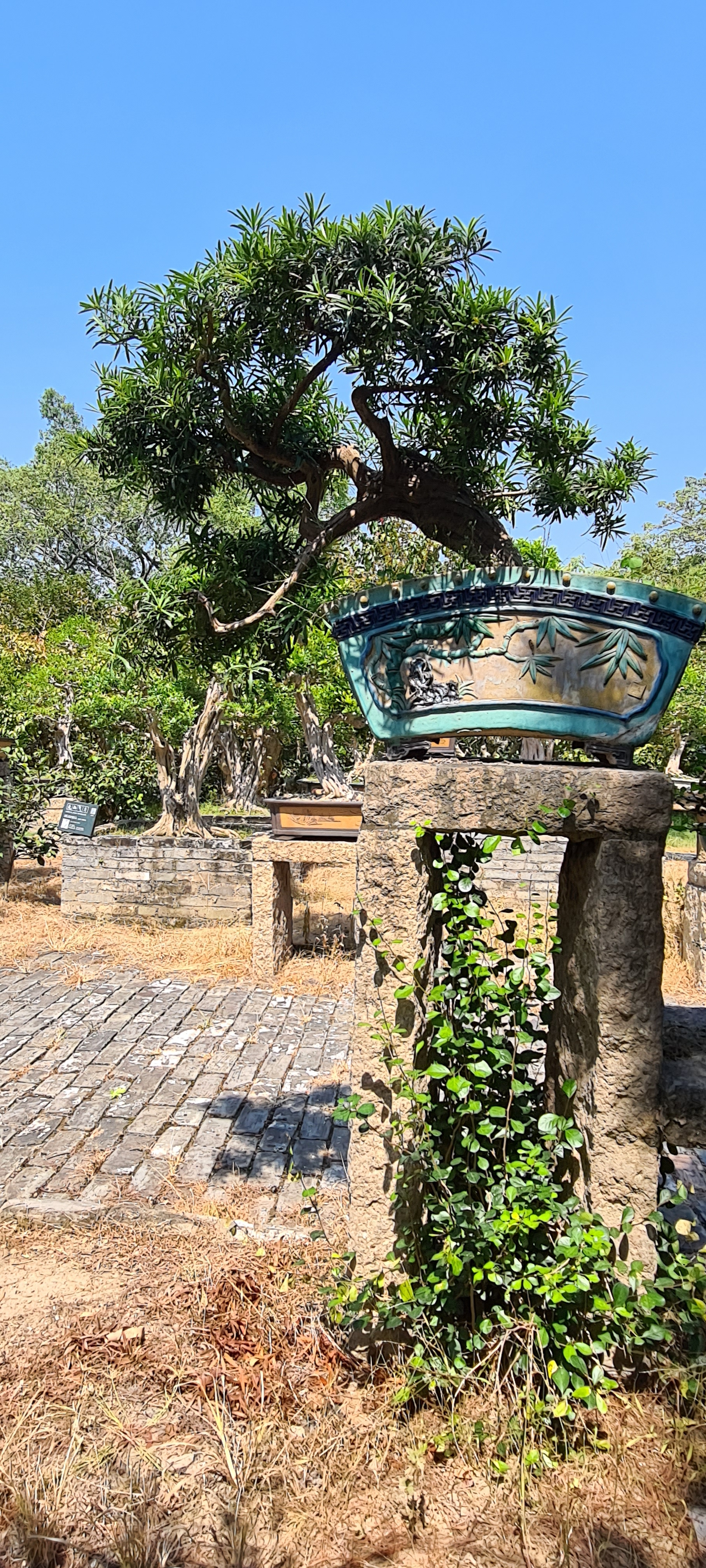
Penjing presented in the south garden.

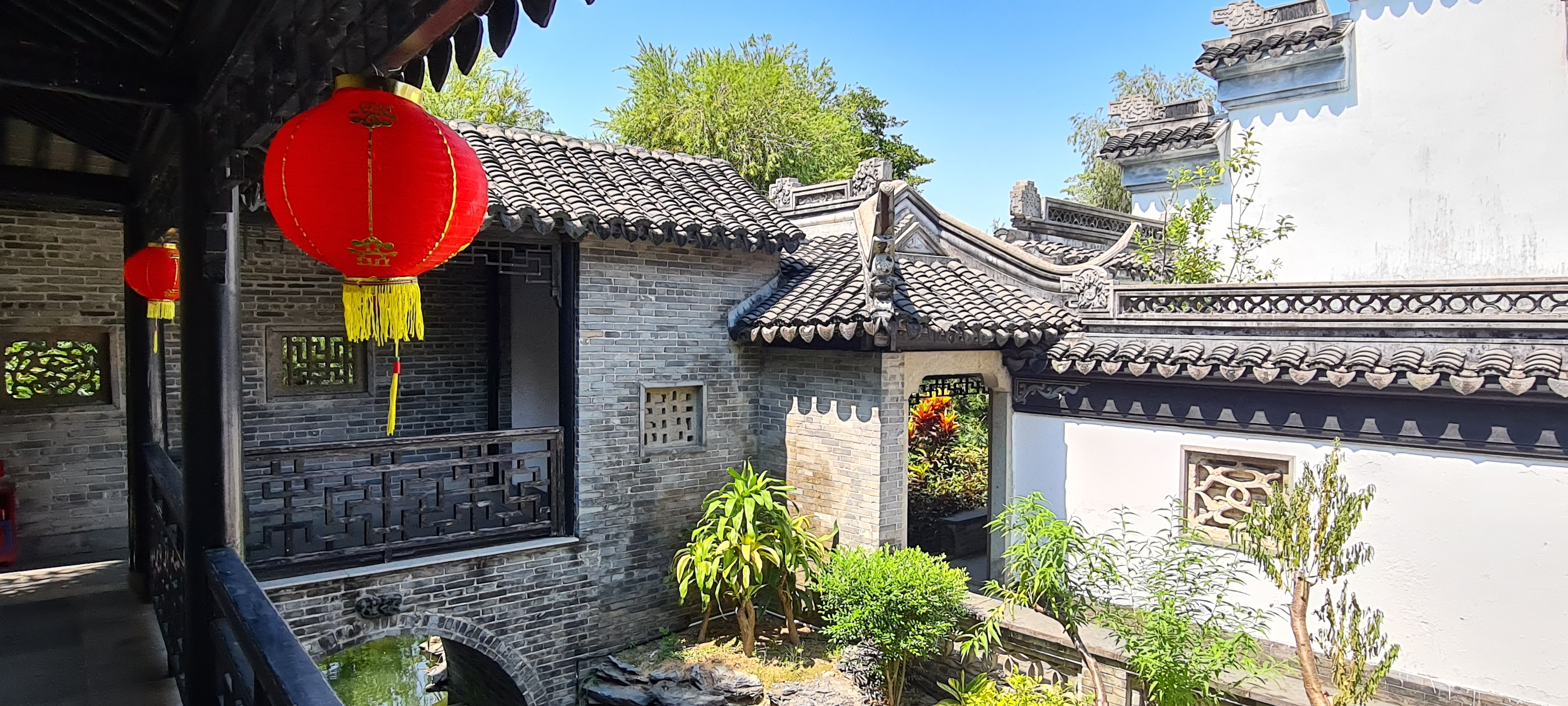
Architecture in the south garden showing the relationship between walkway, fixed buildings, water, rooflines and plantings.

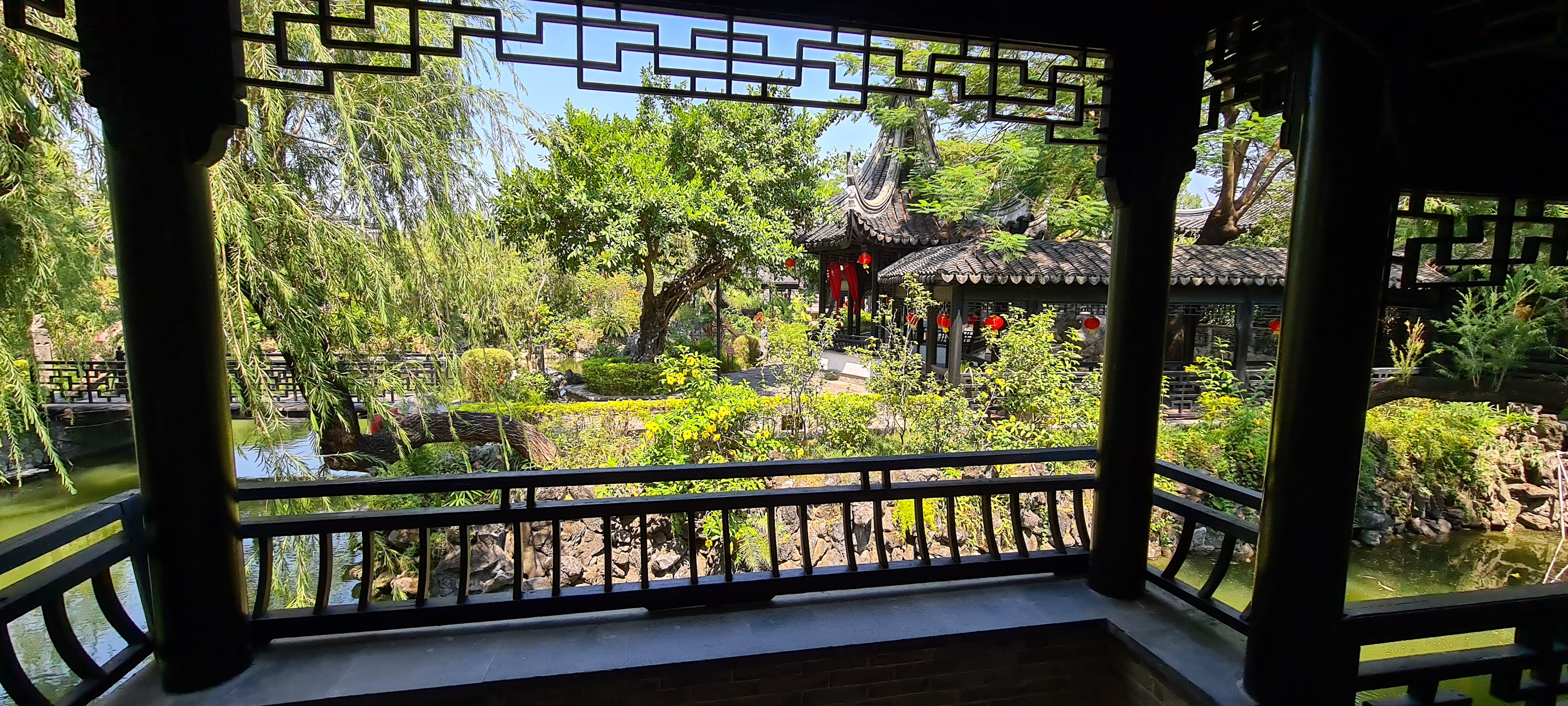
Covered walkway in the south garden with view to a pavilion, waterway and ornamental garden bridge.

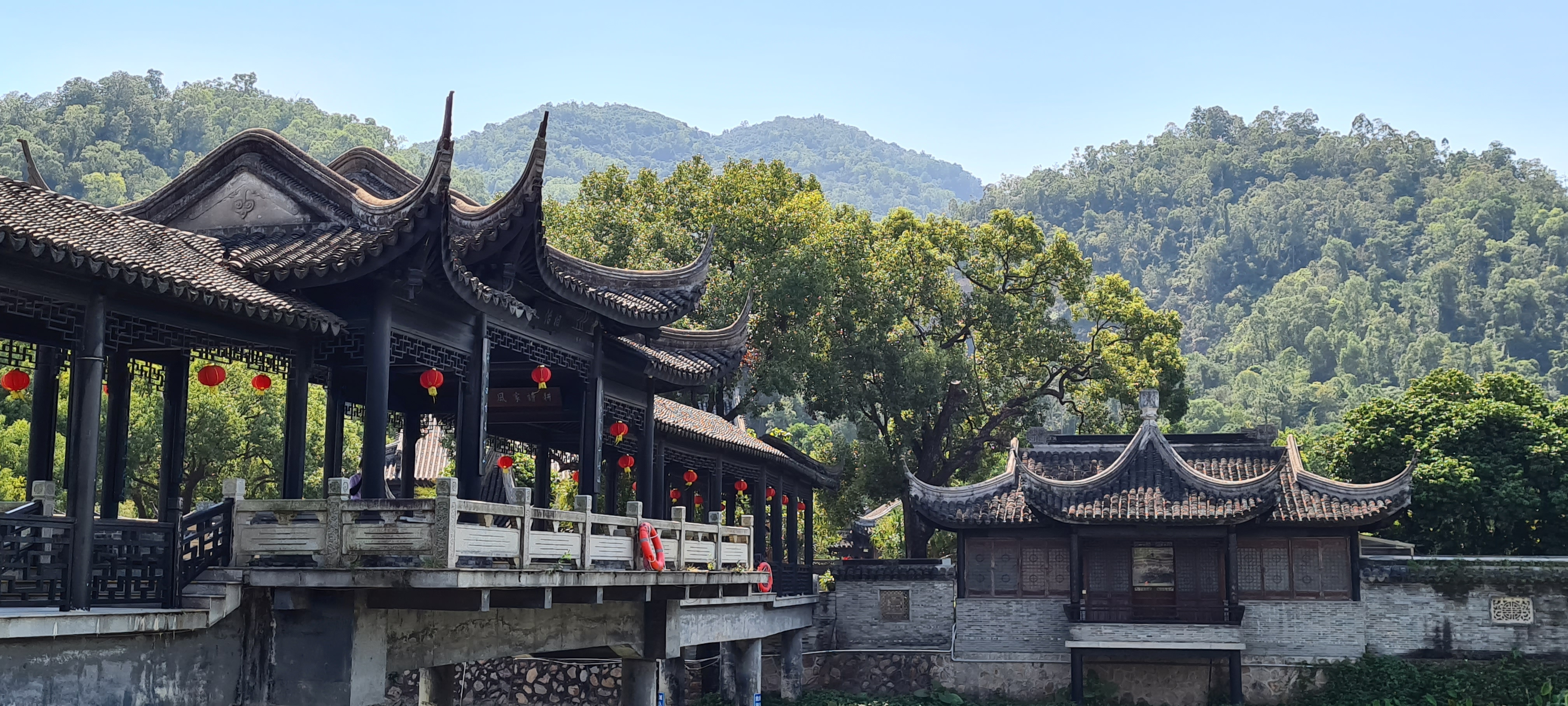
The covered bridge, looking south to Huzhou Mountain (湖洲山).

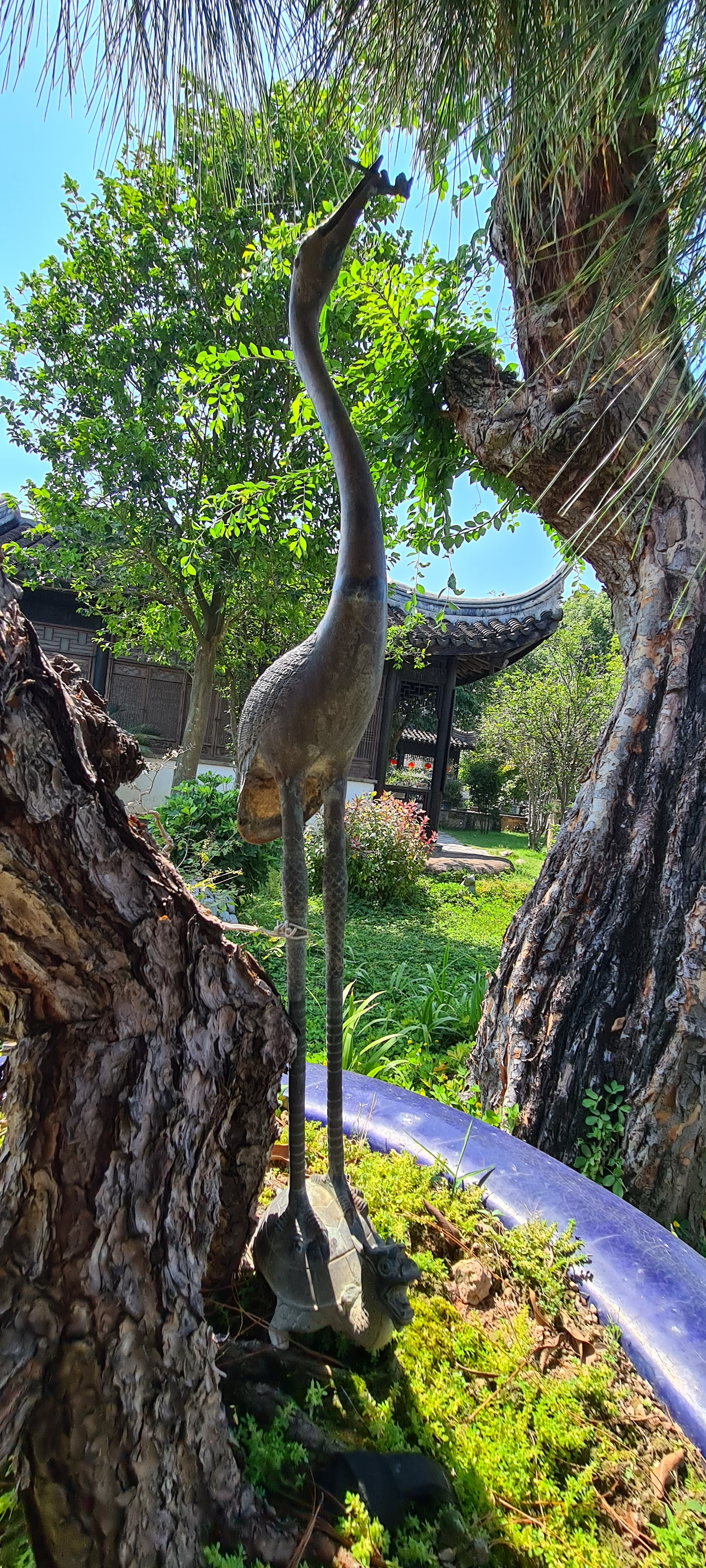
A bronze crane, spirit turtle and pine sculpture representing longevity in the northern garden. Note the material, which references Chinese ritual bronzes following the Confucian garden conception.

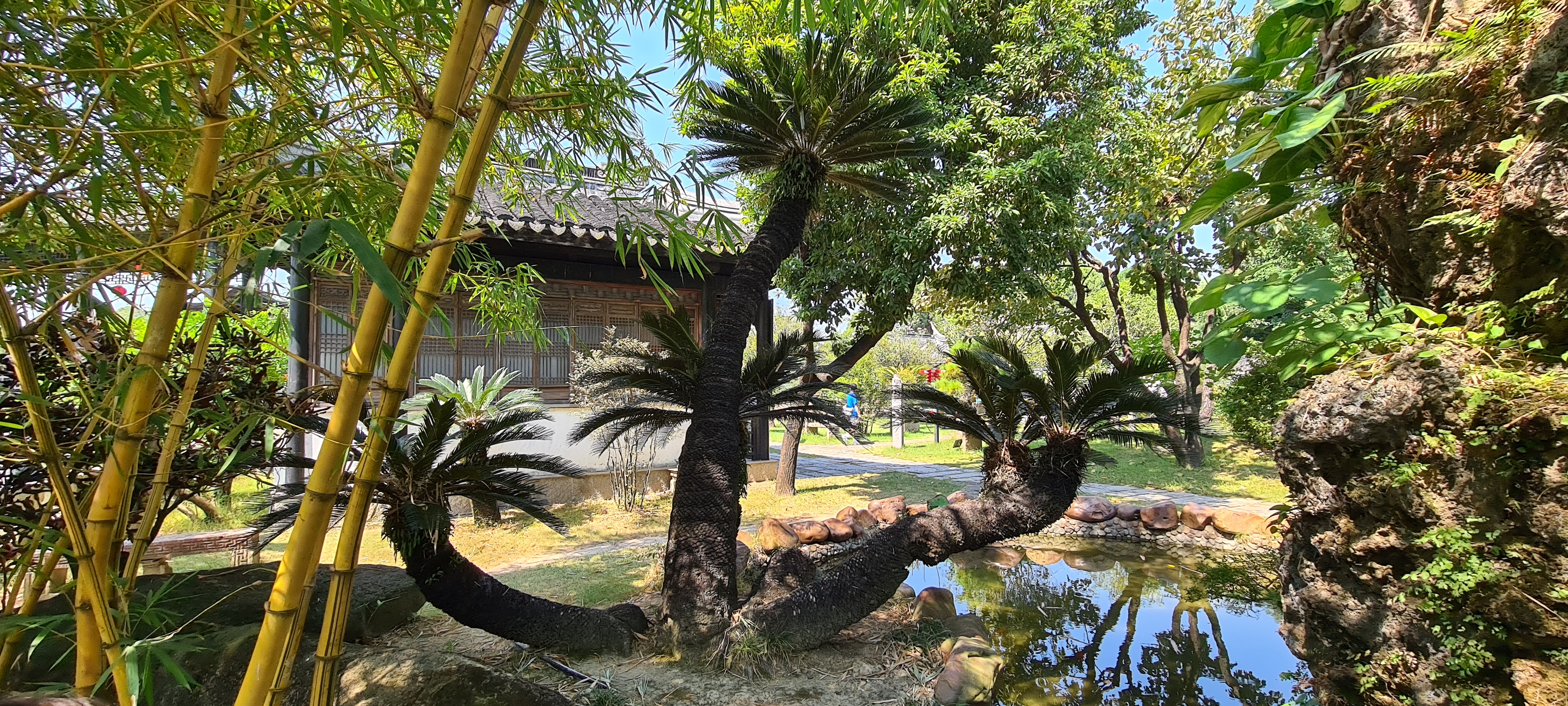
Giant, ancient Cycas revoluta on display in the northern garden.

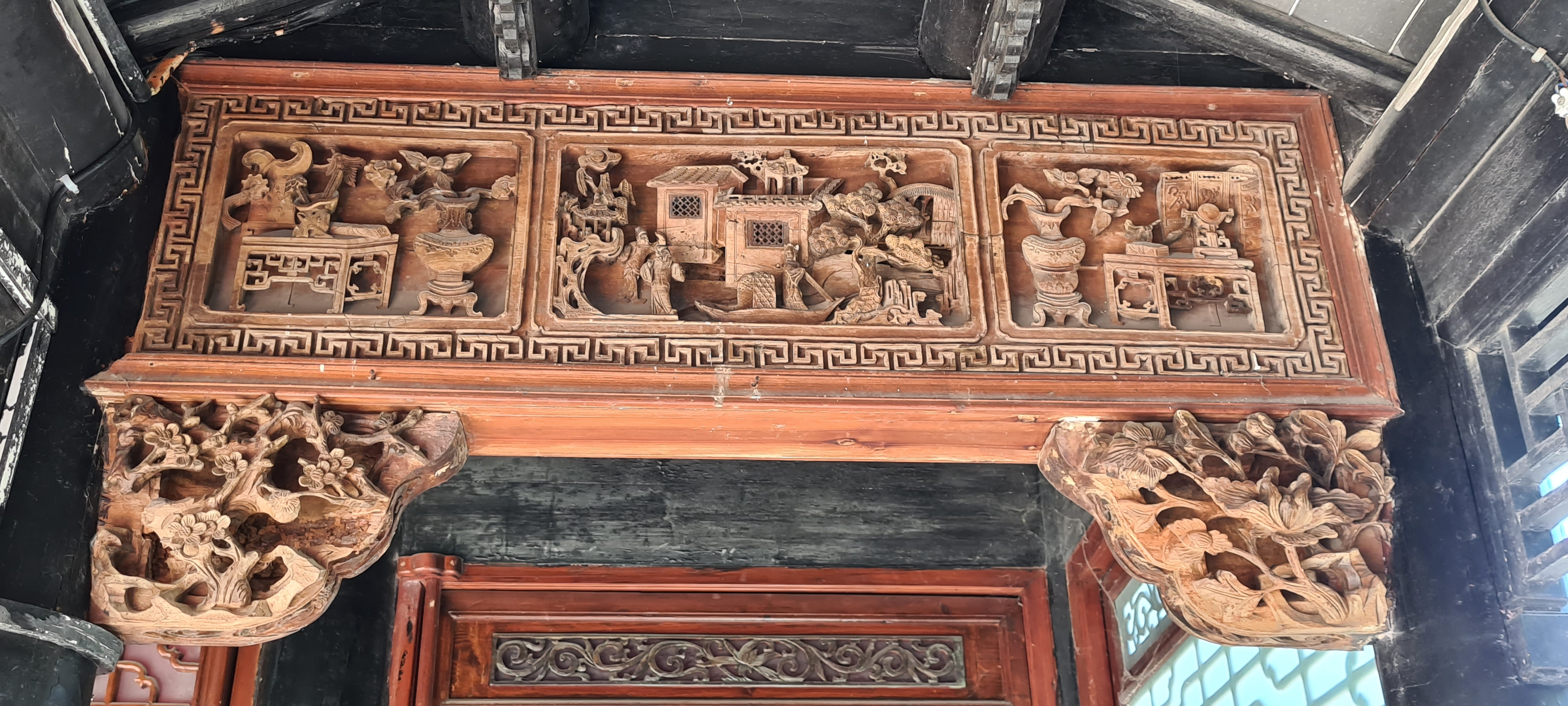
Detail of a carved wooden decorative lintel at the south garden forecourt.

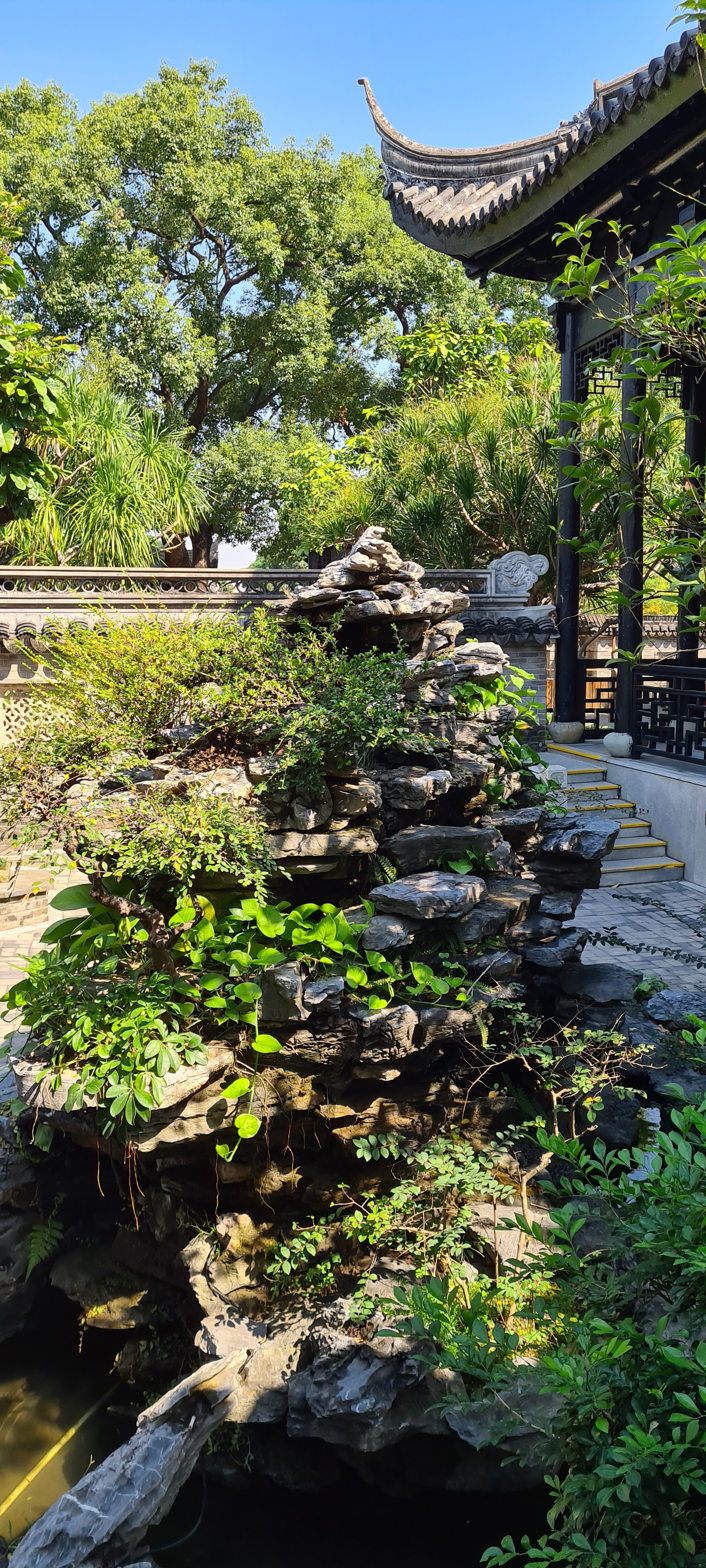
Lingnan-style rockery in the south garden.

== See also ==
- Chinese architecture
- Ancient Chinese wooden architecture
- List of Chinese gardens
- Penjing
