= Yechun Garden =

Coordinates: 32.394304°N 119.412928°E

Yechun Garden (冶春茶社) is a distinctive garden in Yangzhou, China. Yechun in Chinese means "girls and boys go on some outings in spring".

== Brief Introduction ==
Yechun Garden was built in the late Ming and early Qing dynasty and was once part of the imperial park.

== History ==
Yechun Garden used to be the Qing Dynasty poet Wang Yuyang's private garden, where he recited works with a circle of friends. After the liberation of China in 1949, the city of Yangzhou touched the scenery around Slender West Lake by establishing a garden covering Shengqing teahouse, Xiangyinglang teahouse and Yechun flower house which all lie on the banks of Slender West Lake with its original name Yechun.
