= Liyuan station =

Liyuan station can refer to:

- Liyuan station (Beijing Subway), a metro station in Tongzhou District, Beijing, China
- Liyuanzhuang station, a metro station in Mentougou District, Beijing, China
- Liyuan station (Wuhan Metro), a metro station in Wuhan, China
- Liyuan station (Shenzhen Line 3), a metro station on Line 3 (Shenzhen Metro) in Longgang District, Shenzhen, China
- Liyuan station (Shenzhen Line 17), a metro station under construction on Line 17 (Shenzhen Metro) in Luohu District, Shenzhen, China
