= Zhan Garden (Nanjing) =

Chinese garden in Nanjing

Coordinates: 32°01′21″N 118°46′47″E

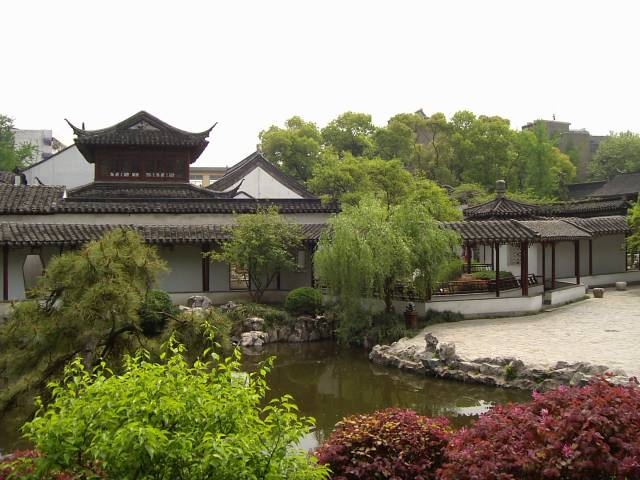
Zhan Garden

Map

Zhan Garden (simplified Chinese: 瞻园; traditional Chinese: 瞻園; pinyin: Zhān Yuán, literally "Garden of Forward Watching") is a Chinese garden located on No. 128 Zhan Yuan Road, beside Fuzimiao, Nanjing, Jiangsu, China.

The first garden on this site was built during the early Ming dynasty by the general Xu Da. It was destroyed during the Taiping Rebellion in the Qing dynasty, but was rebuilt later. As the main residence of Jiangsu Provincial Governor in the late Qing dynasty, it was visited by the Qianlong Emperor and was restored after 1949, with the southern 'mountain' added in 1960.

On the grounds is the Taiping Heavenly Kingdom History Museum.

== Gallery ==
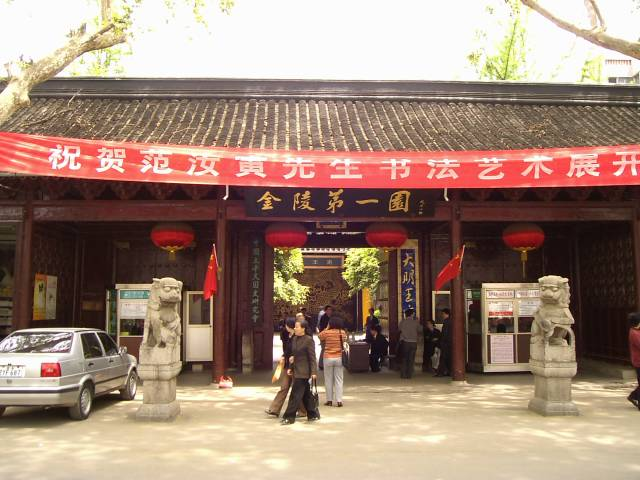
Entrance to Zhan Garden

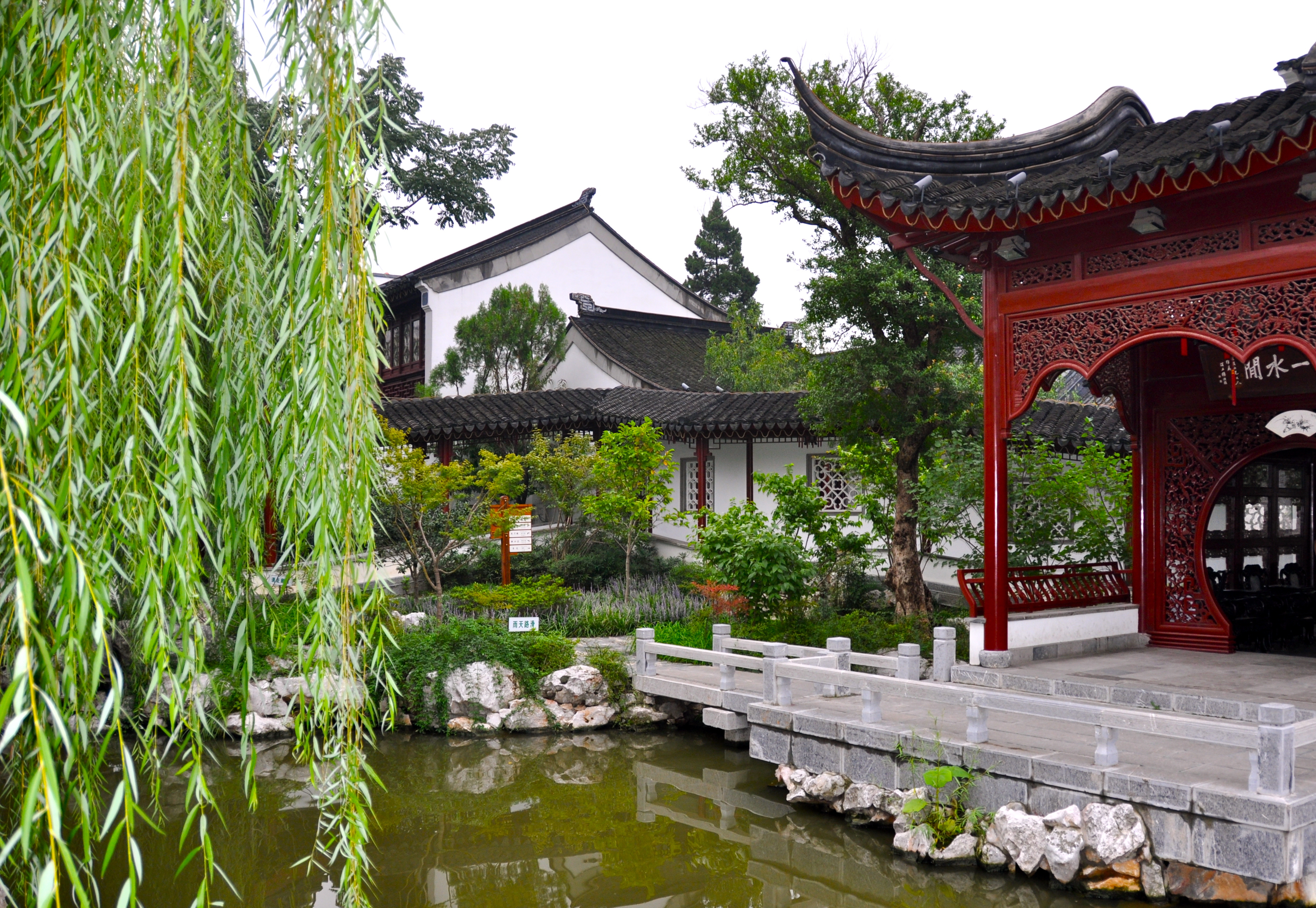
Zhan Garden

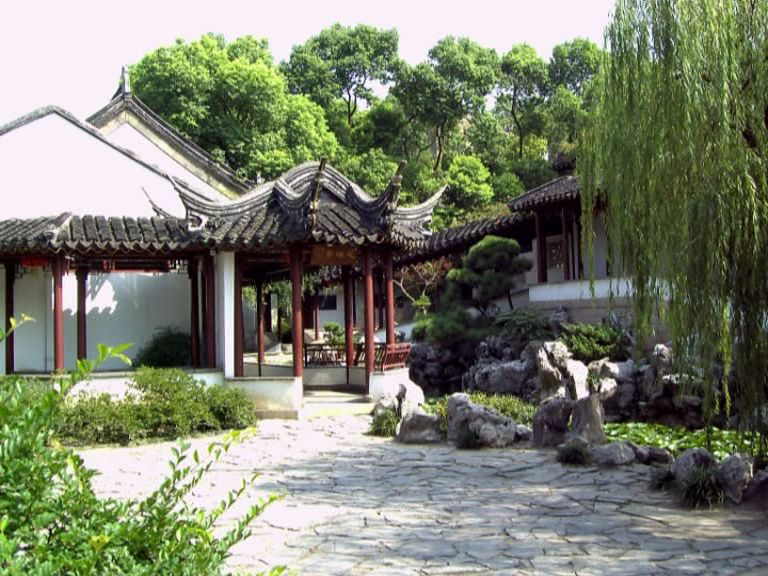
Zhan Garden

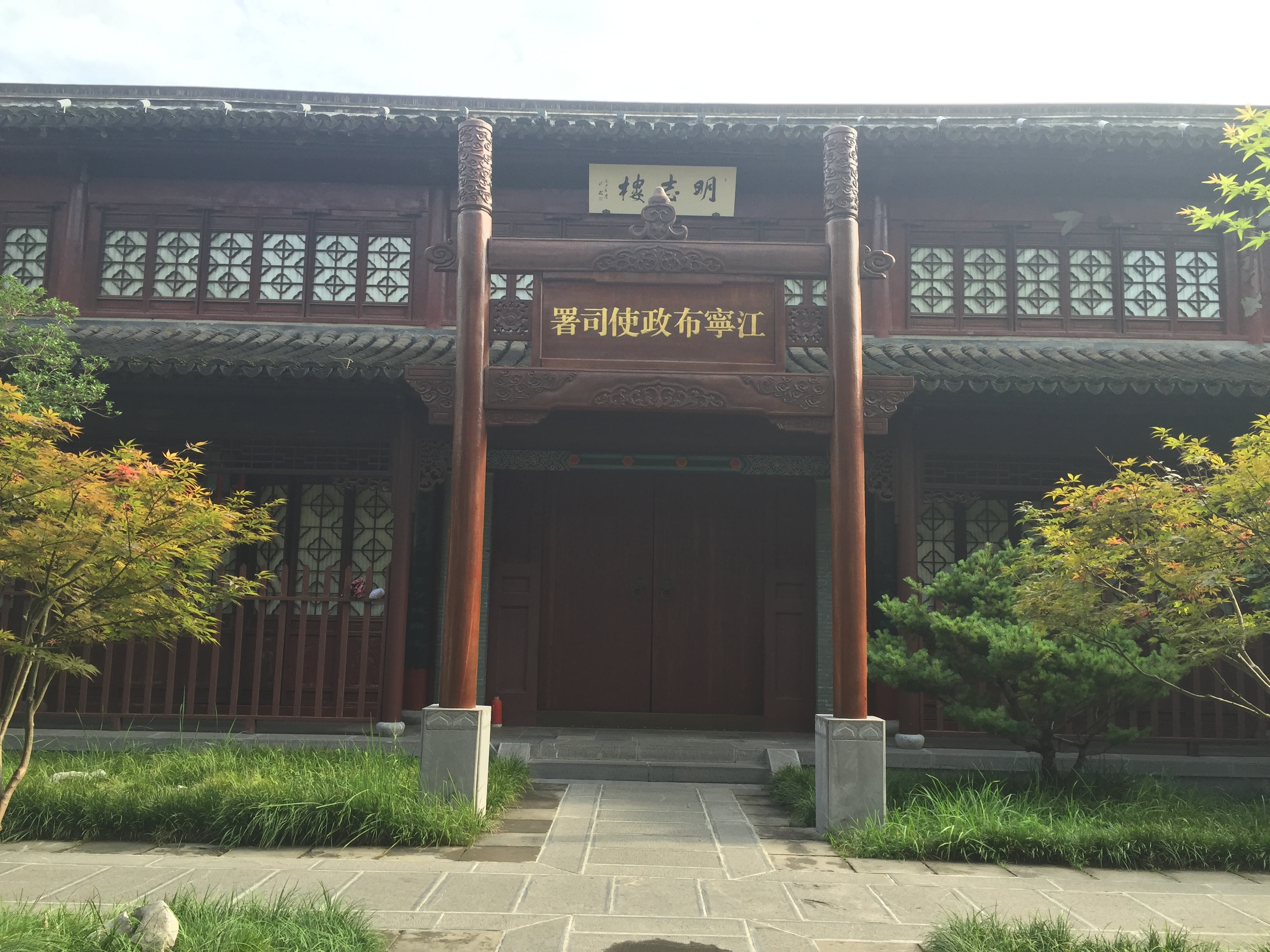
Mingzhi Hall, served as the memorial hall of Jiangsu Governor, was located in Zhan Yuan.

== See also ==
- List of Chinese gardens
- Geographic data related to Zhan Garden (Nanjing) at OpenStreetMap
