= Nine-turn bridge =

Chinese garden feature

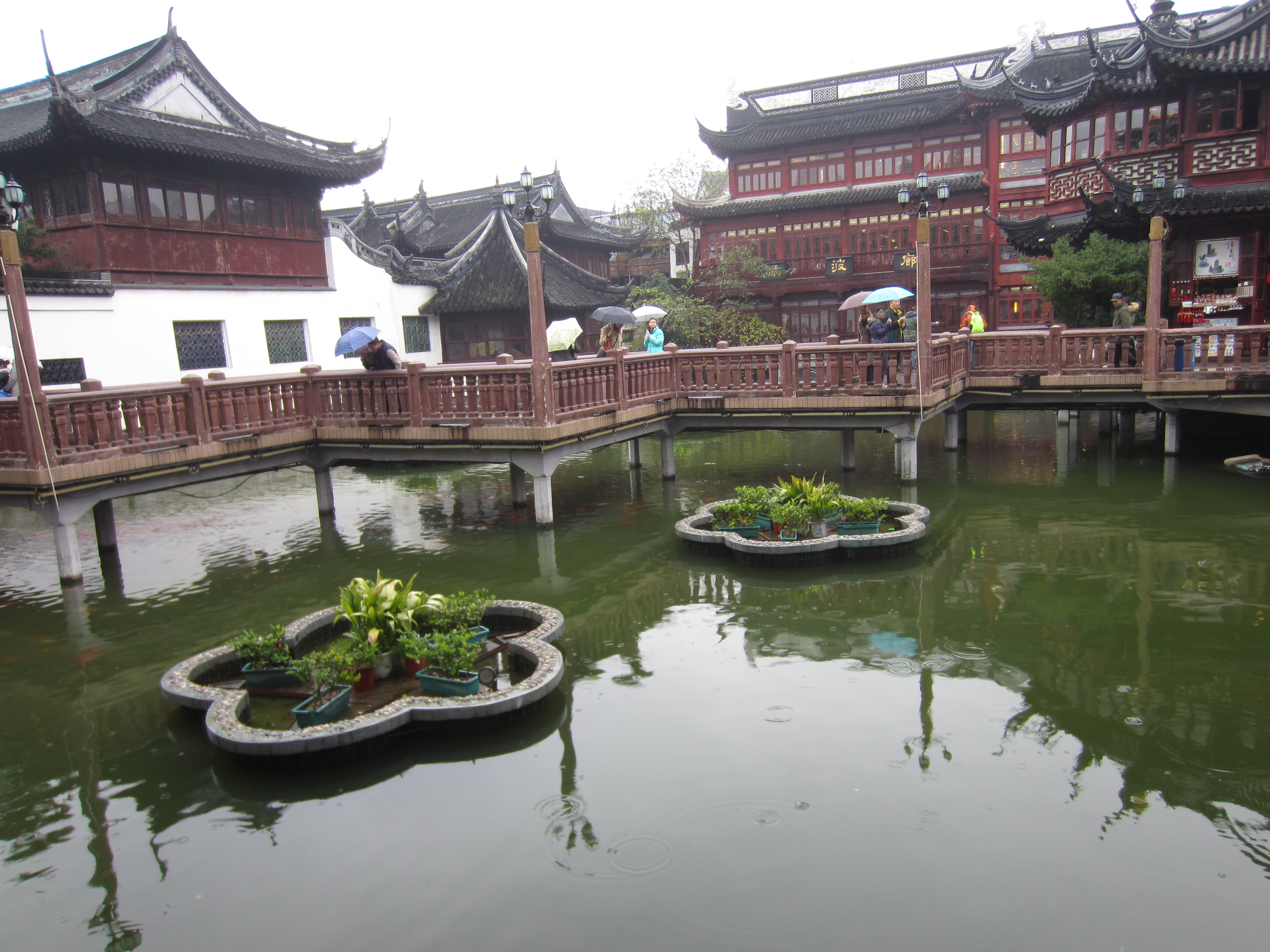
Yu Garden, Shanghai, China

The Nine-turn bridge (Chinese: 九曲桥) or Zigzag bridge is one of the features of Chinese Gardens, where the bridge is designed to turn several times, so one can enjoy viewing different scenes. The bridge is usually made of stones or concrete with decorated guard rails, and the angles of the turns can be at right angles, at any other angle or curved.

The Nine-turn bridge is typically found in Chinese Gardens that were made during the Song dynasty.

== Gardens where the Nine-turn bridges are found ==
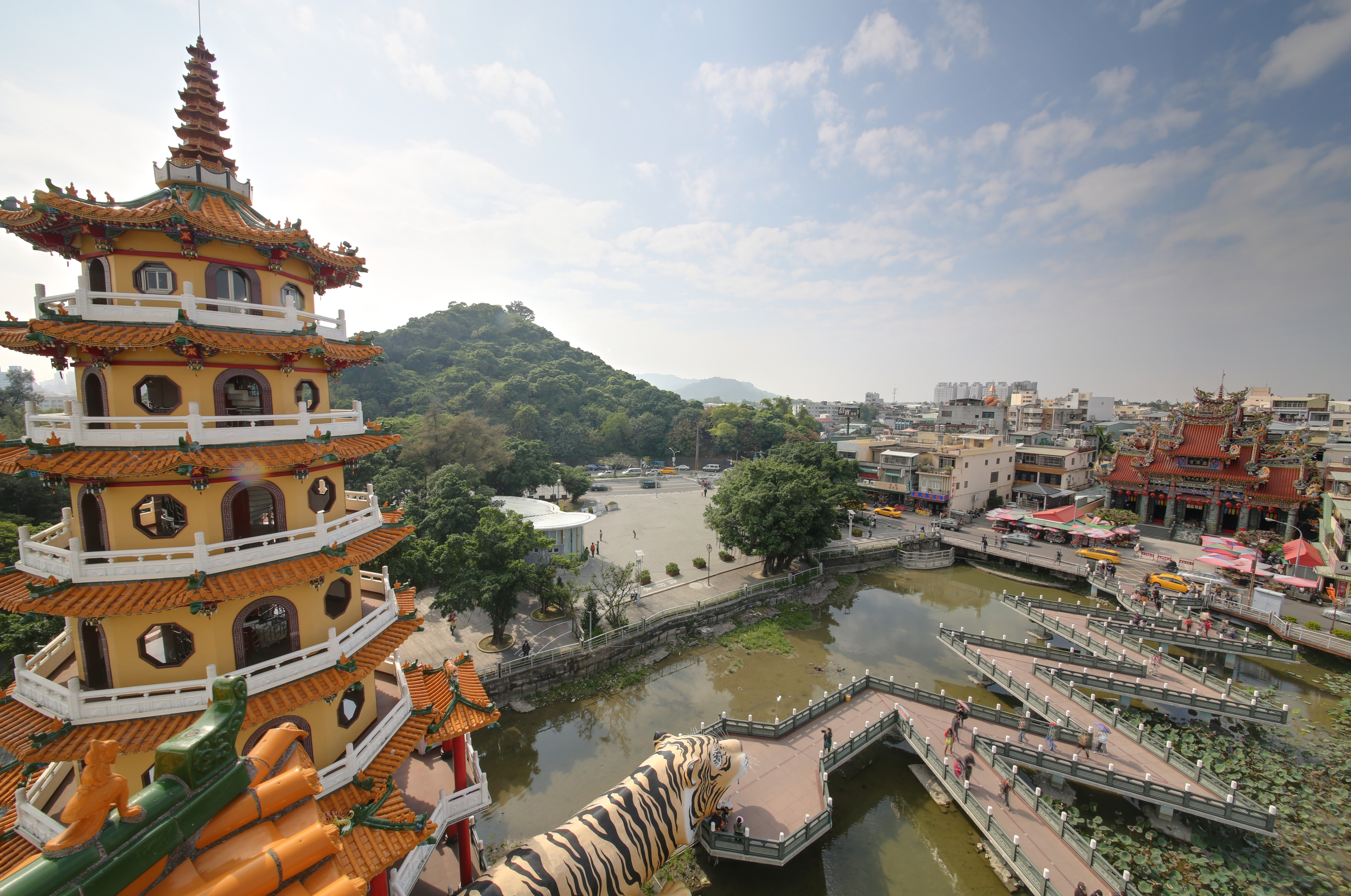
Lotus Pond, Kaohsiung, Taiwan

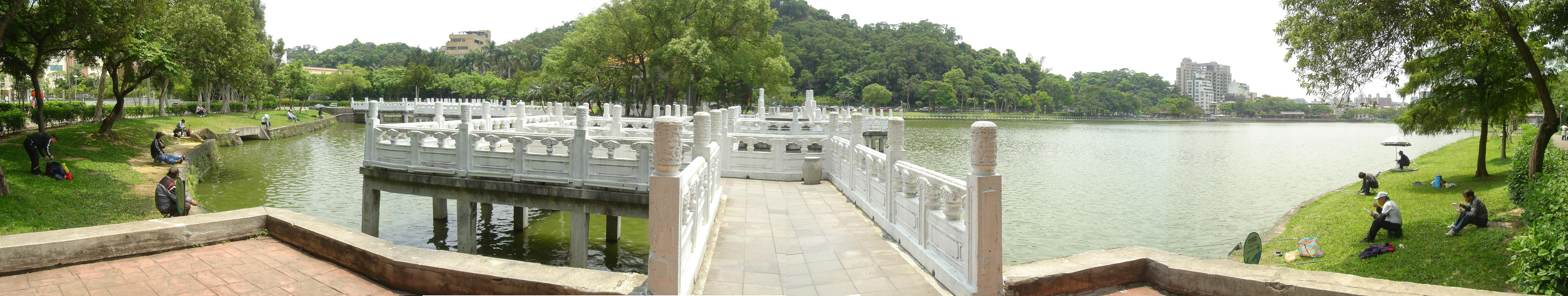
Nine-turn bridge in Bihu Park, Taipei

The nine-turn bridge is found in many Chinese Gardens worldwide, or lakes and ponds, natural or man-made.

- Yu Garden, Shanghai, China
- West Lake, Hangzhou - Quyuanfenghe (曲院風荷)
- Geyuan Garden, Hangzhou
- Classical Gardens of Suzhou: Lingering Garden, Lion Grove Garden, Humble Administrator's Garden, etc.
- Huizhou West Lake (惠州西湖), Huizhou
- Lou Lim Ieoc Garden, Macao
- Chengcing Lake, Kaohsiung, Taiwan
- Lotus Pond, Kaohsiung, Taiwan.
- Dahu Park, Taipei
- Bihu Park, Taipei
- Honmoku Municipal Park (本牧市民公園), Yokohama, Japan - Shanghai-Yokohama Friendship Garden
- Gifu Park, Gifu City - Sino-Japanese Friendship Park
- National Arboretum, Washington, D.C., U.S. - Chinese Garden (under construction): a replica of Geyuan Garden
- Luisenpark, Mannheim, Germany - Chinese Garden

== Gallery ==
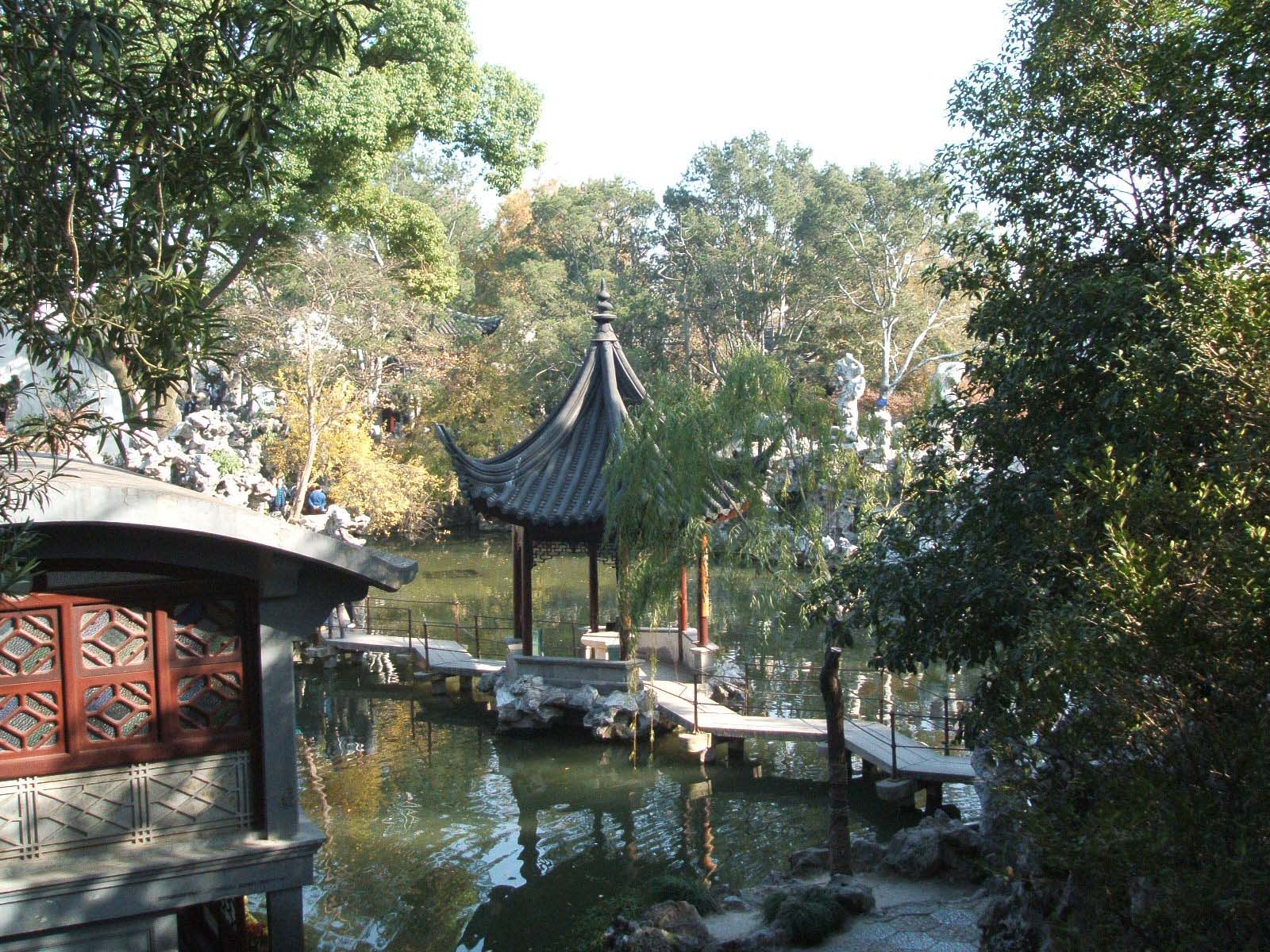
Lion Grove Garden, Suzhou

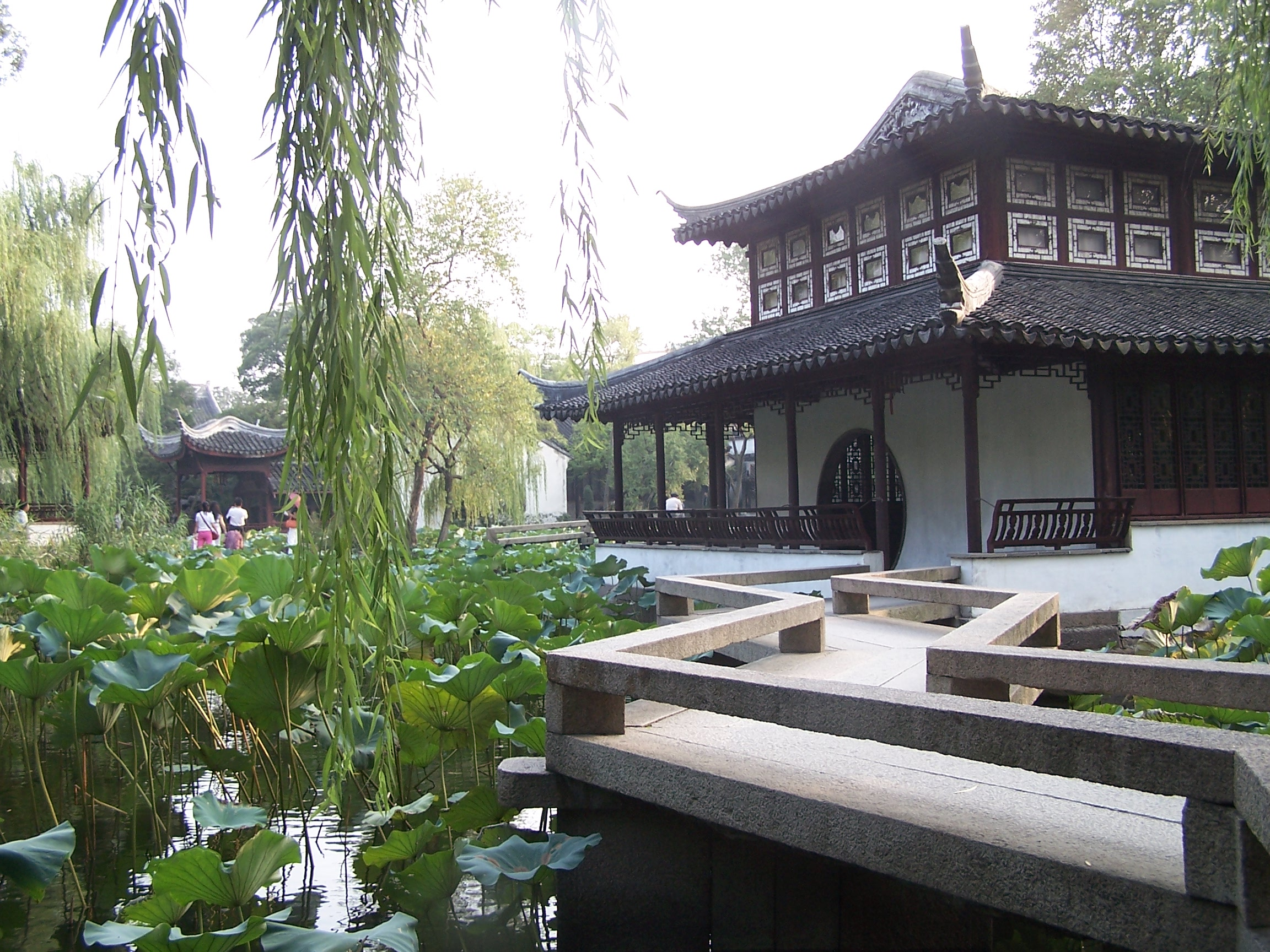
Humble Administrator's Garden, Suzhou

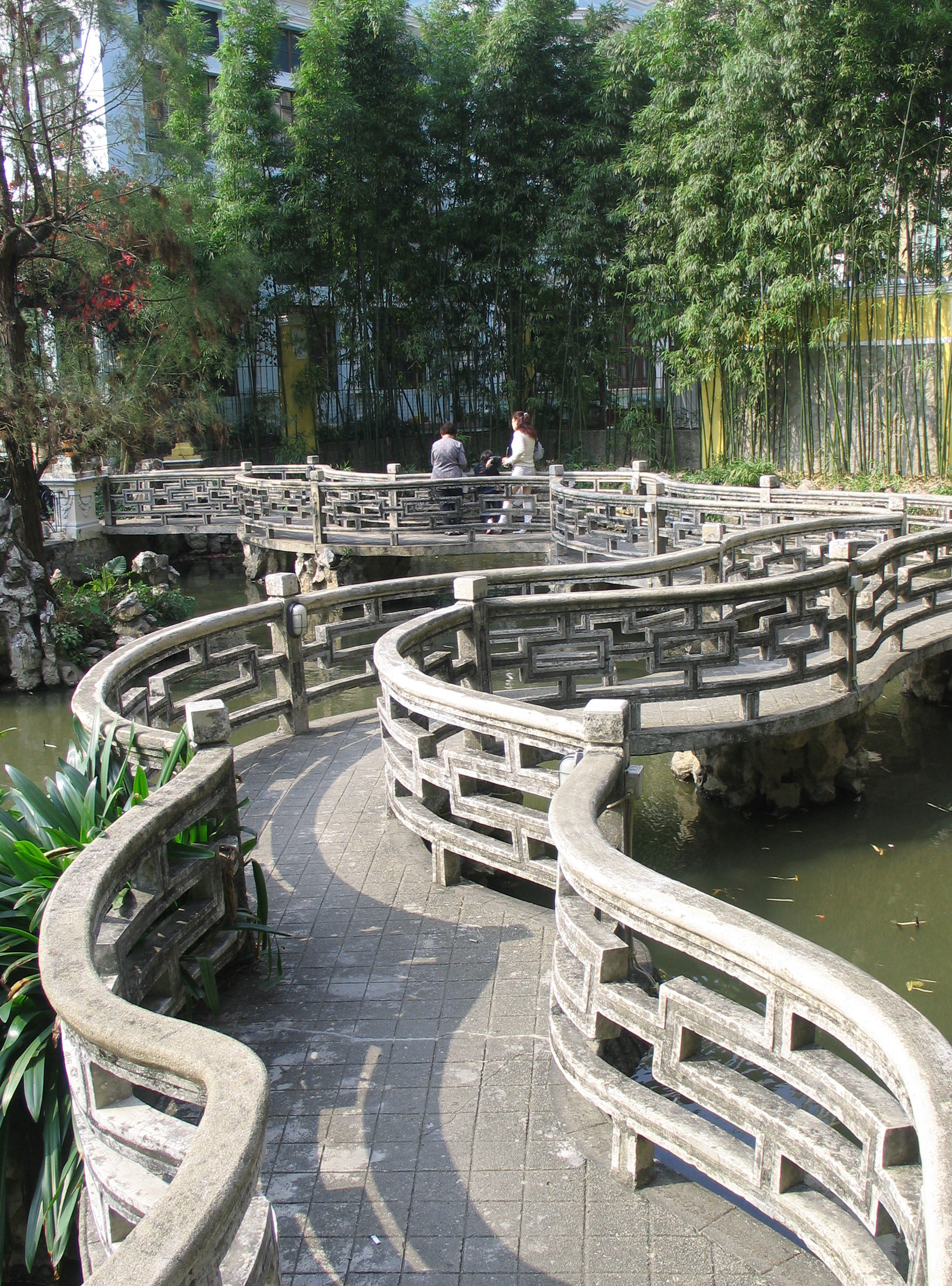
Lou Lim Ieoc Garden, Macao

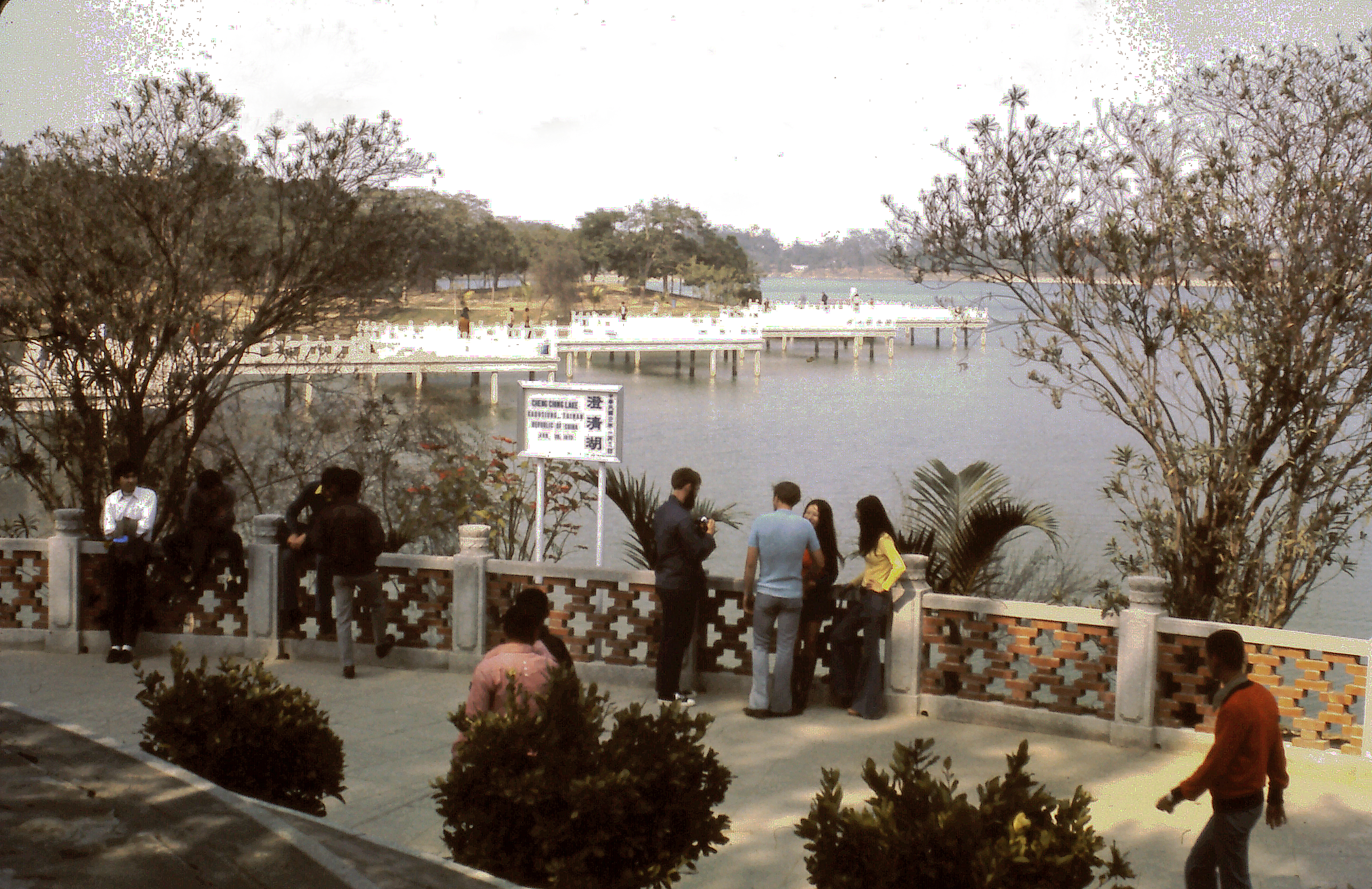
Chengcing Lake, Kaohsiung

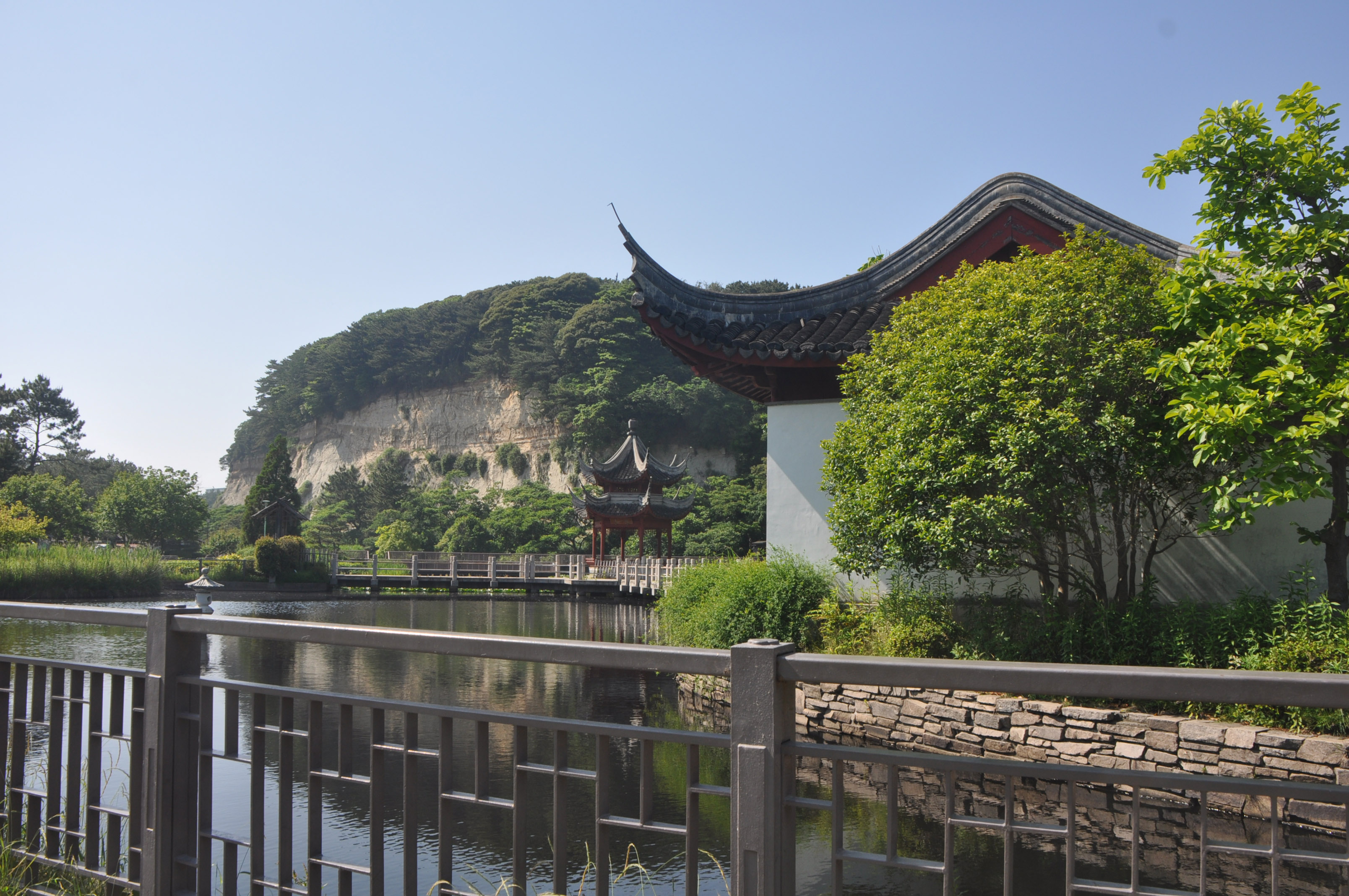
Honmoku Municipal Park, Yokohama

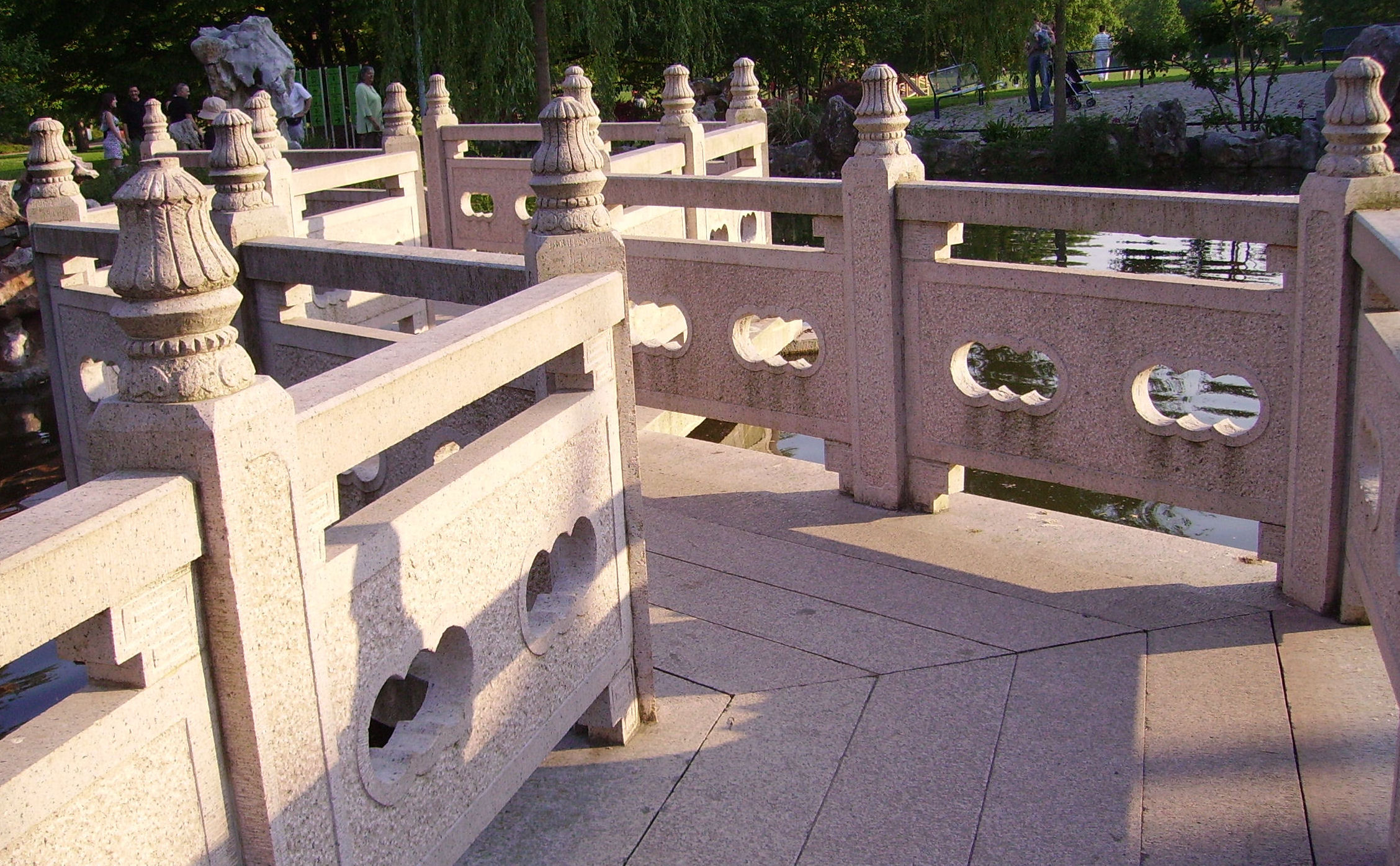
Luisenpark, Mannheim, Germany - Chinese Garden

== Zigzag bridge in Japanese Garden ==
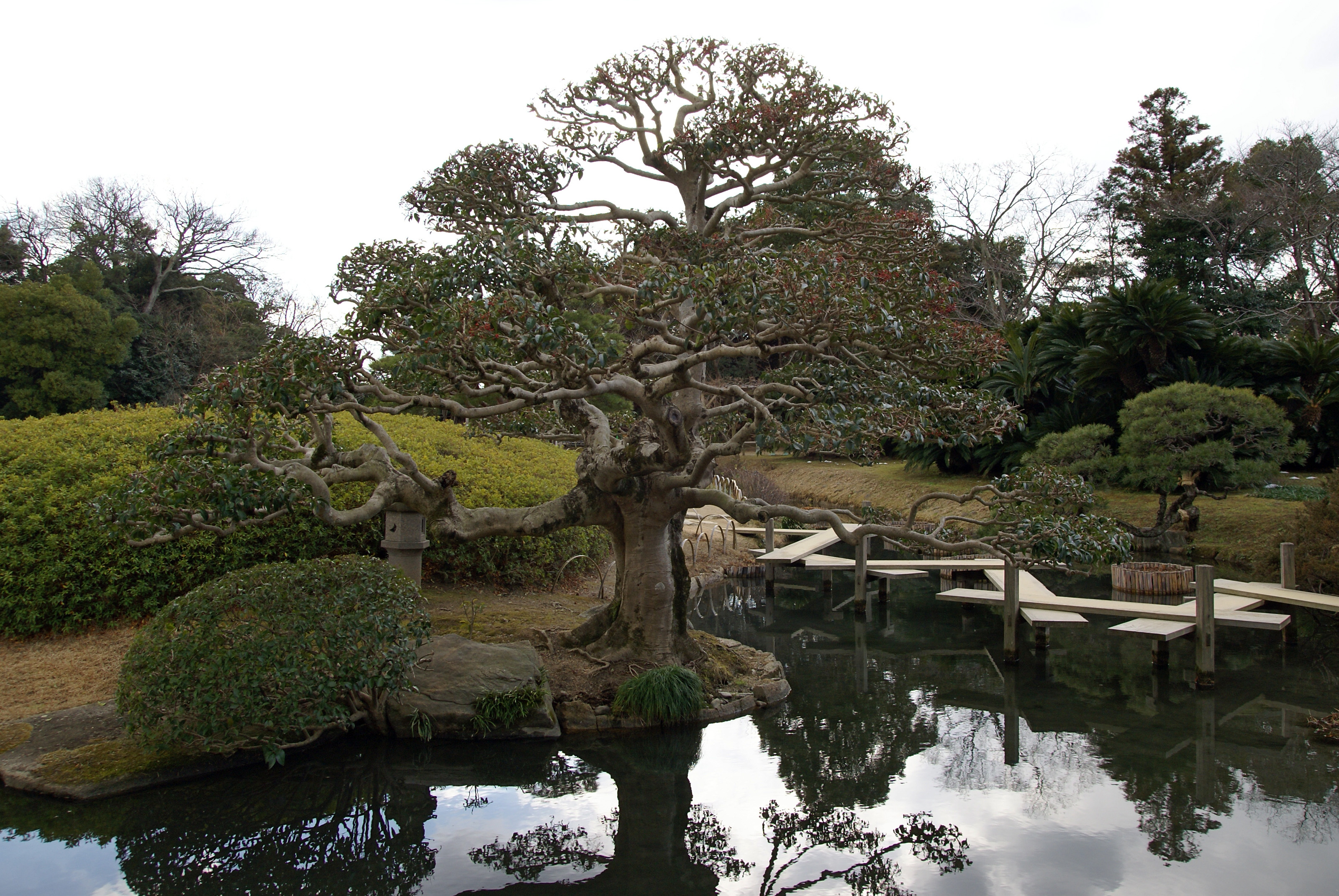
A wooden zigzag bridge in Kōraku-en, Okayama City, Japan

Zigzag bridges are sometimes found in Japanese Gardens, but they are usually a simple wooden bridge without guard rails.

== See also ==
- Architecture of the Chinese Garden
- Japanese Garden
