= East Garden =

East Garden may refer to:

- A former name of the Jacqueline Kennedy Garden at the White House, Washington, D.C., United States
- Imperial Palace East Garden in the Tokyo Imperial Palace, Japan
- The eastern section of Yu Garden's Inner Garden in Shanghai, China
- Original name of the Lingering Garden, China
- the main garden of the Couple's Retreat Garden, China
- Original name of Tsinghua Garden
