= Mountain Villa with Embracing Beauty =

The Mountain Villa with Embracing Beauty
UNESCO World Heritage Site
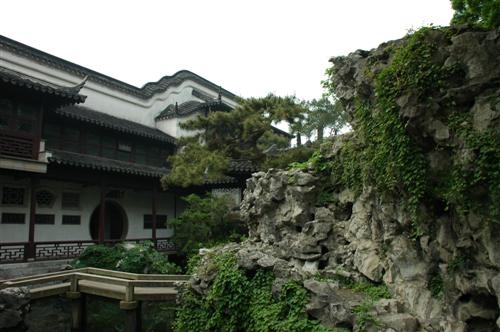
- Mountain Villa with Embracing Beauty

- Location within Jiangsu Location within China
- Location: Suzhou, Jiangsu, China
- Part of: Classical Gardens of Suzhou
- Criteria: Cultural: (i)(ii)(iii)(iv)(v)
- Reference: 813bis-004
- Inscription: 1997 (21st Session)
- Extensions: 2000
- Area: 0.218 ha (0.54 acres)
- Coordinates: 31°18′47.4″N 120°36′32.4″E

The Mountain Villa with Embracing Beauty (Chinese: 环秀山庄; pinyin: Huánxiù Shānzhuāng; Suzhou Wu, Wugniu: Gue^{2} seu^{5} se^{1} tsaon^{1}, Wu Chinese pronunciation: [ɡue̞ søʏ se̞ tsɑ̃]) is a Chinese garden located on 272 Jingde Rd., inside the Embroidery Museum in Suzhou, Jiangsu, China. In 1997, it was recognized with other classical Suzhou gardens as a UNESCO World Heritage Site.

== History ==
The history of the Mountain Villa with Embracing Beauty may date back to the Jin dynasty (266–420), when Education Minister Wang Xun (王旬) and his brother Wang Min (王珉) donated their residential house to build Jingde Temple (景德寺). Later during Five Dynasties era, it became Jingu Garden (金谷园), owned by Qian Yuanliao (钱元璙), son of the emperor of Wuyue Kingdom, Qian Liu. In the Song dynasty, it was the pharmaceutical garden of Zhu Changwen (朱长文), a scholar. In following centuries, it was rebuilt several times. In the Jiajing era of the Ming dynasty, it became the Xuedao Academy of Classical Literature (学道书院), and later, the office of provisions supervisor. In 1573, it was the residence of Grand Councilor, Sheng Shixing (申时行). In the late Ming dynasty and early Qing dynasty, his descendant, Sheng Jikui (申继揆), built Qu Garden (蘧园) here.

During the Qianlong era of the Qing dynasty, it was the residence of Jiang Ji (蒋楫), director of Jurisdiction Department. Jiang built Qiuzi Tower (求自楼), and piled stones to form a rockery behind it. He dug the ground to three feet, and a spring emerged and created a pond, called Flying Snow (飞雪). Other houses and pavilions were also erected. The garden subsequently was owned by Bi Yuan (毕沅), the Imperial Secretary of State, and Sun Shiyi, the Chief Counselor. Sun's grandson Sun Jun, in 1807, asked rockery master Ge Yuliang (戈裕良) to rebuild this garden. Ge built the rockery within a field of half mu (0.08 acre) while the effect was overwhelming as if it spread for many li. The garden gained its reputation for its rockery ever since. Wang Zhou, Director of Works, bought the garden and renamed it Mountain Villa of Embraced Beauty. In 1949 the garden became property of the government and in 1988 was declared a major historic site.

== Design ==
The 2,180 m^{2} garden is composed along a linear axis with three main elements: a grotto called Autumn Hill, and Flying Snow Pool, fed by a waterfall called Flying Snow Spring, and a main hall. The rock work in this garden displays every technique and effect used in Chinese gardens. In addition, it is a recreation of the five important mountains of China, and shows a mastery of creating a sense of vast space in a small area.

Garden Design Elements with Description
Autumn Peak
Autumn Peak Cave
Gatehouse
In Company with a Ravine Hall A three bay hall with front portico and an attached courtyard with covered corridor on three sides.
Housing the Mountain with a Half-Filled Pool A square pavilion on top of the grotto
Make-Up Autumn Gallery A three bay hall on top of the grotto with full gables and a rustic design.
Mountain Villa The main structure, named after the garden. It is a three bay hall with a portico on all four sides.
Putting a Question to Spring Pavilion A square pavilion on piers over Flying Snow Pool.
Side Building An enclosed multilevel gallery built along the west wall of the garden.
Flying Snow Spring

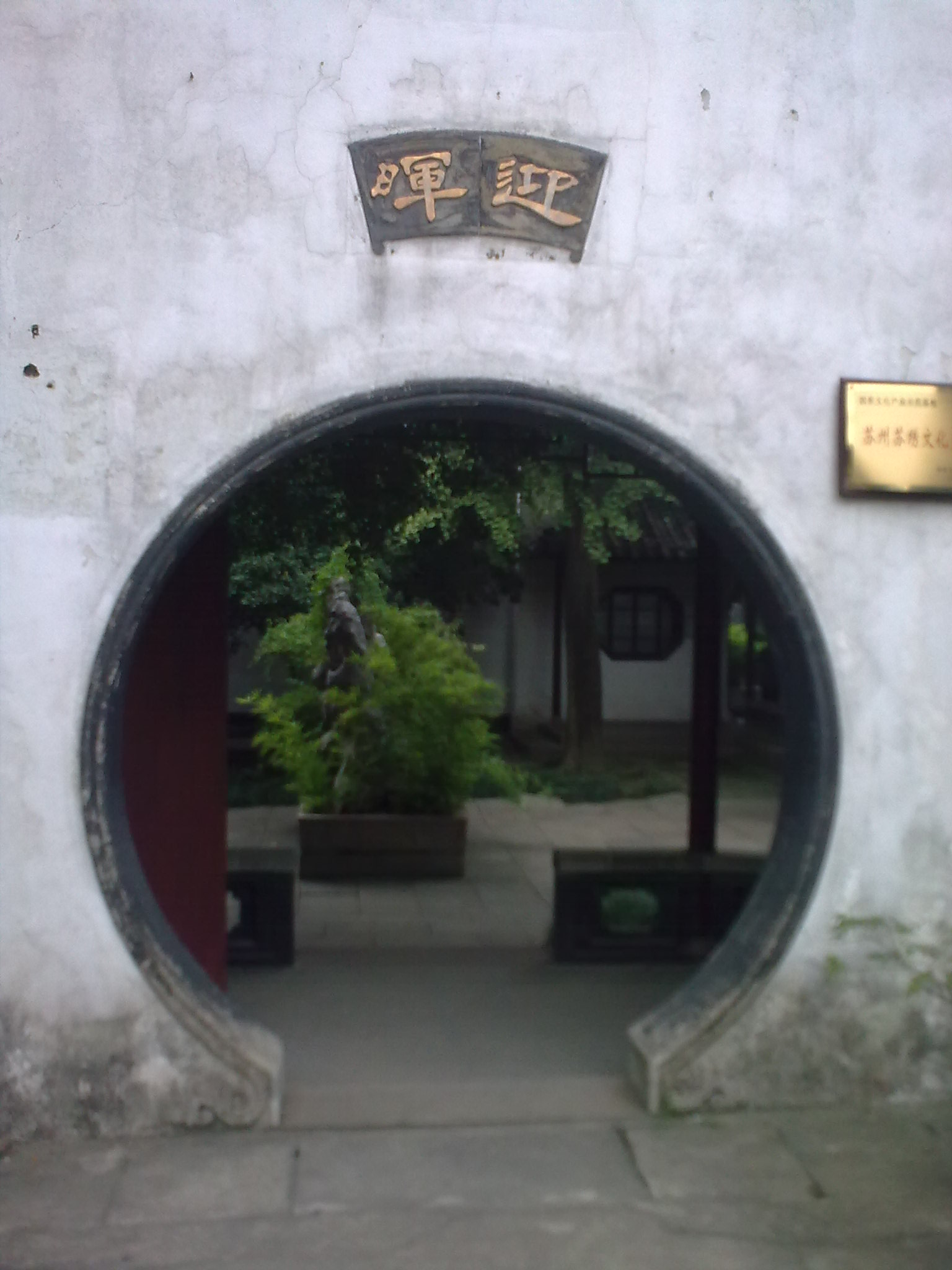
Moongate Entry

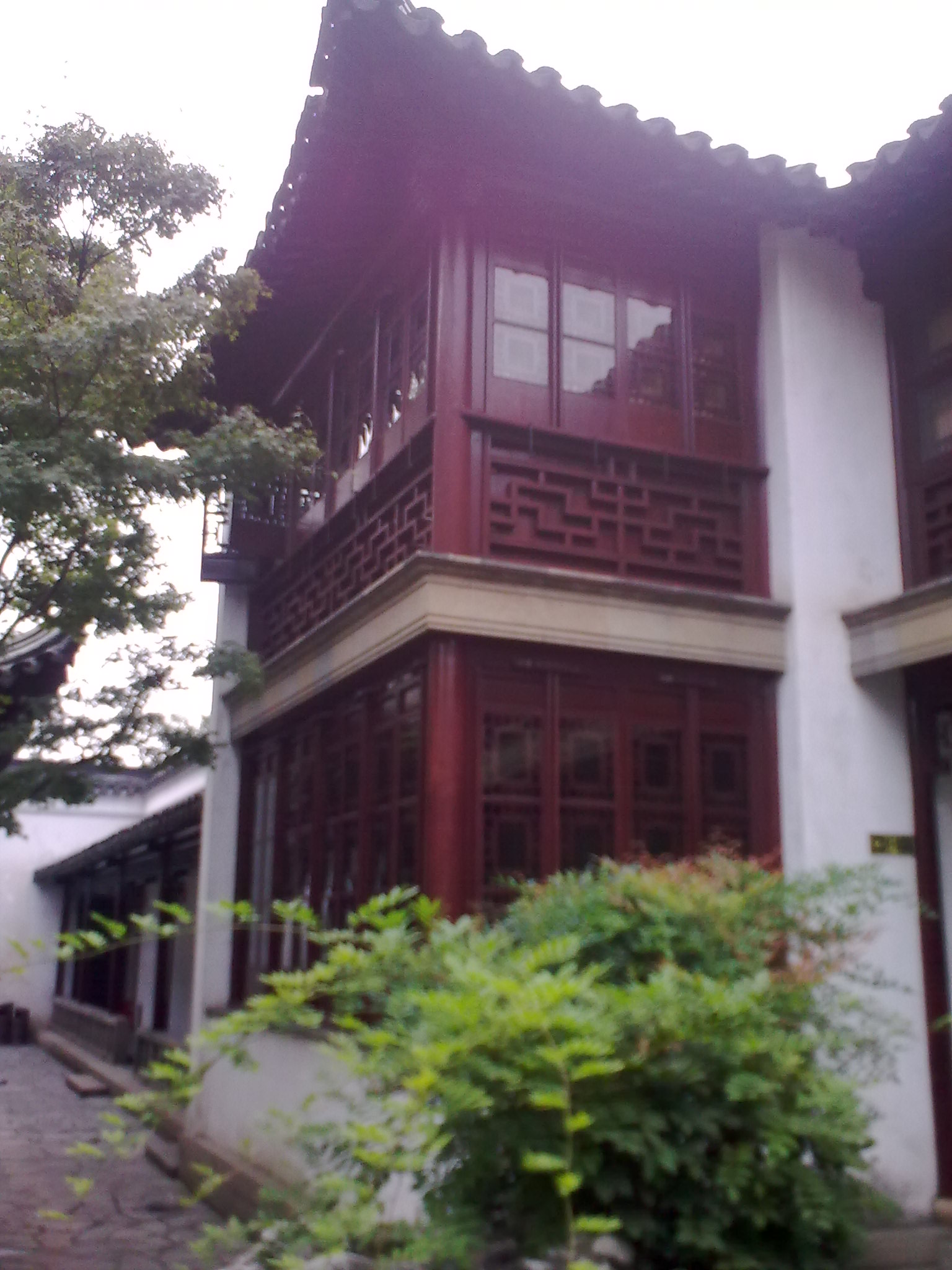
A tower

== See also ==
- Chinese garden
- Suzhou
