= Classical Gardens of Suzhou =

Chinese Classical garden in Jiangsu province

UNESCO World Heritage Site
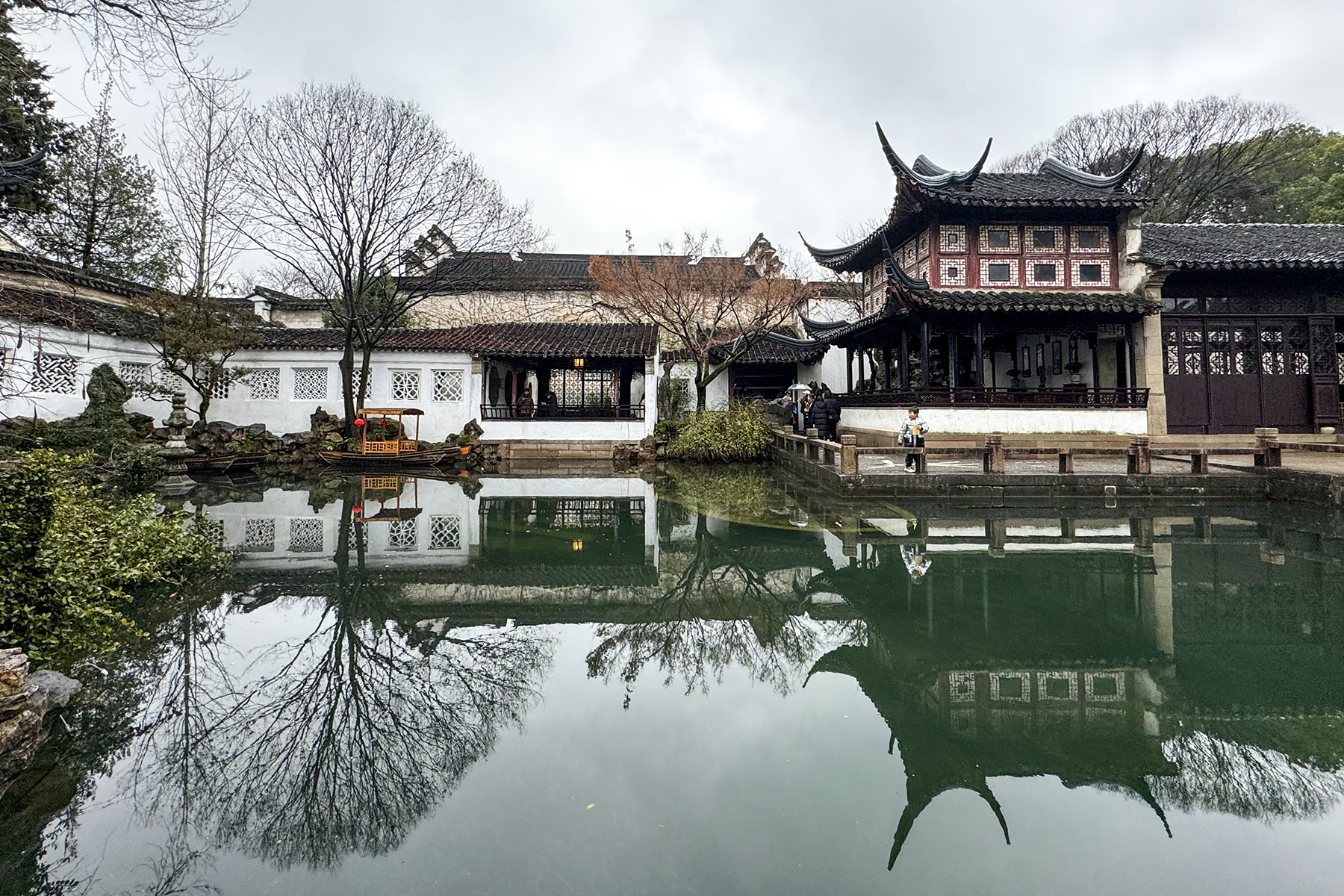
- Lingering Garden in Suzhou

- Location within Jiangsu Location within China
- Location: Suzhou, Jiangsu, China
- Criteria: Cultural: (i)(ii)(iii)(iv)(v)
- Reference: 813bis
- Inscription: 1997 (21st Session)
- Extensions: 2000
- Area: 11.922 ha (29.46 acres)
- Buffer zone: 26.839 ha (66.32 acres)
- Coordinates: 31°19′N 120°27′E

The Classical Gardens of Suzhou (traditional Chinese: 蘇州園林; simplified Chinese: 苏州园林; pinyin: Sūzhōu yuánlín; Suzhounese (Wugniu): sou^{1}-tseu^{1} yoe^{2}-lin^{2}) are a group of gardens in the city of Suzhou, in Jiangsu, China, that are on the UNESCO World Heritage List.

Spanning a period of almost one thousand years, from the Northern Song to the late Qing dynasties (11th-19th century), these gardens, most of them built by scholars, standardized many of the key features of classical Chinese garden design with constructed landscapes mimicking natural scenery of rocks, hills and rivers with strategically located pavilions and pagodas.

The elegant aesthetics and subtlety of these scholars' gardens and their delicate style and features are often imitated by various gardens in other parts of China, including the various Imperial Gardens, such as those in the Chengde Mountain Resort. According to UNESCO, the gardens of Suzhou "represent the development of Chinese landscape garden design over more than two thousand years", and they are the "most refined form" of garden art.

These landscape gardens flourished in the mid-Ming to early-Qing dynasties, resulting in as much as 200 private gardens. Today, there are 69 preserved gardens in Suzhou, and all of them are designated as protected "National Heritage Sites". In 1997 and 2000, eight of the finest gardens in Suzhou along with one in the nearby ancient town of Tongli were selected by UNESCO as a World Heritage Site to represent the art of Suzhou-style classical gardens.

Famous Suzhou garden designers include Zhang Liang, Ji Cheng, Ge Yuliang, and Chen Congzhou.

== The gardens ==
| Image | Name | Inscription date |
|---|---|---|
| | Humble Administrator's Garden (拙政园/拙政園; Zhuōzhèng Yuán) | 1997 |
| | Lingering Garden (留园/留園; Liú Yuán) | 1997 |
| | Master of the Nets Garden (网师园/網師園; Wǎngshī Yuán) | 1997 |
| | Mountain Villa with Embracing Beauty (环秀山庄/環秀山莊; Huánxiù Shānzhuāng) | 1997 |
| | Couple's Retreat Garden (耦园/耦園; Ŏu Yuán) | 2000 |
| | Garden of Cultivation (艺圃/藝圃; Yì Pǔ) | 2000 |
| | Great Wave Pavilion (沧浪亭/滄浪亭; Cāng Làng Tíng) | 2000 |
| | Lion Grove Garden (狮子林园/獅子林園; Shī Zǐ Lín Yuán) | 2000 |
| | Retreat & Reflection Garden (退思园/退思園; Tuìsī Yuán) | 2000 |

== Comprehensive monitoring plan ==
The site is monitored following a comprehensive monitoring plan and there is provision for both the routine maintenance and programmed conservation projects for all of the gardens. The Suzhou Municipal Administrative Bureau of Gardens is responsible for this.

== See also ==
- Chinese garden
- Five Peaks Garden
