= Couple's Retreat Garden =

The Couple's Retreat
UNESCO World Heritage Site
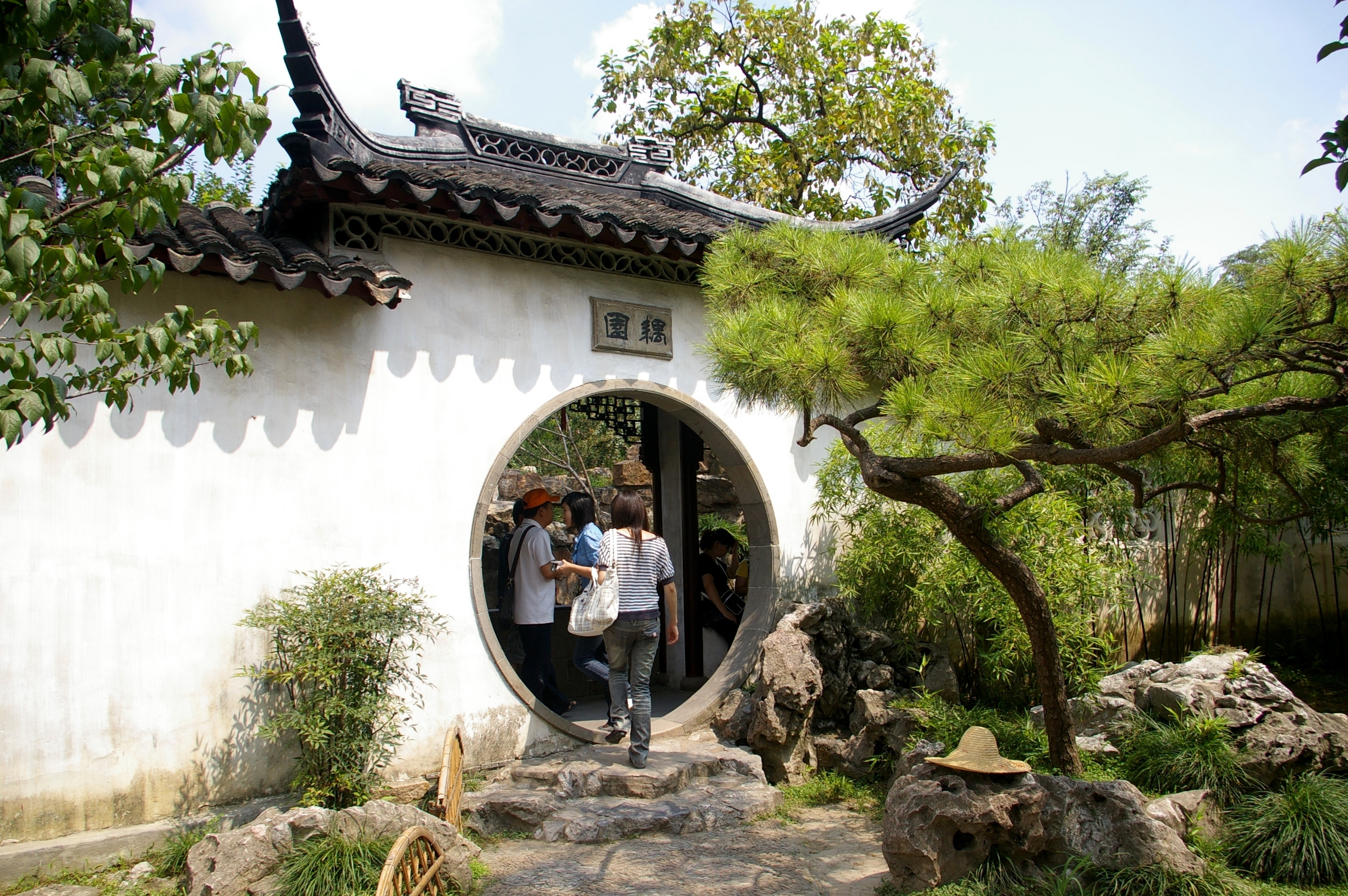
- The Couple's Retreat Garden

- Location within Jiangsu Location within China
- Location: Suzhou, Jiangsu, China
- Part of: Classical Gardens of Suzhou
- Criteria: Cultural: (i)(ii)(iii)(iv)(v)
- Reference: 813bis-008
- Inscription: 2001 (25th Session)
- Area: 0.789 ha (1.95 acres)
- Buffer zone: 3.039 ha (7.51 acres)
- Coordinates: 31°19′05.90″N 120°38′04.30″E

Couple's Retreat Garden (Chinese: 耦园; pinyin: Ǒu Yuán; Suzhou Wu, Wugniu: Ngeu^{6} yoe^{2}, Wu Chinese pronunciation: [ŋøʏ ɦyø]) located in Suzhou city, Jiangsu province, China is a famous classical Chinese garden. It is recognized with other classical Suzhou gardens as a UNESCO World Heritage Site.

== History ==
The original garden was built by Lu Jin, prefect of Baoning district, in 1874. It was purchased by Shen Bingcheng, the magistrate of Susong, who rebuilt it in its current form. He also changed the name to the Couple's Garden Retreat. This name refers to the garden's two parts and alludes to a couple. It is recognized with other classical Suzhou gardens as a UNESCO World Heritage Site.

== Design ==
The 0.33 ha garden is divided into an east and west section by the residential core in the middle; an unusual composition for a classical garden. The eccentric design is continued in the form and details of many of the garden buildings, especially the Taoism Tower. The garden is located in the intersection of canals and is surrounded by water on three sides. It is accessible directly from the canal by boat. The west garden is composed of several structures grouped around a small grotto and a Library annex. It is structurally joined to the central residence. The east garden is the main garden of the complex. It consists of a grotto and pond ringed by a covered walkway that connects the structures. A smaller fruit orchard annex is attached.

Garden Design Elements with Description
West Garden
Building Hall A five-bay two-story tower with east and west wings that served as the main residential compound.
Couples Retreat Hall
Eternal Spring
Gatehouse
Hall of Nobility A three-bay hall with front porch
Library Tower
Old House with Woven Curtains Named for Shen Linshi. A three-bay mandrian-duck hall with front and rear porches and annex.
Pavilion of Longevity A square pavilion with enclouse on the north side.
Wine Carriage House A three-bay two-story tower.
East Garden
Among Mountains and Water A one-bay open hall on the water with a full porch
Balcony of No Frippary An artist's studio in a three-bay hall with porch, with views into the cherry orchard.
Collecting Fragrance Hall
Kuxing Tower A unique one-bay tower connected to the taoism practice tower.
Moon Pavilion
My Loveable Pavilion A square pavilion with porch annex, built as part of the original garden.
Studio of the Returned Inkslab Named for the discovery of a lost inkslab by the grandson of the original owner. A three-bay and two-story tower.
Taoism House A unique tower structure of two bays with a specific northeast orientation according to Taoist principals.
Thatched Cottage at the City Corner Based on a pun alluding to the love between herder boy and weaver girl, it is the primary Structure consisting of five bays and two stories. It is adjoined to Studio of the Returned Inkslab and Collecting Fragrance Hall.
Wisteria Decorated Boat

East Garden

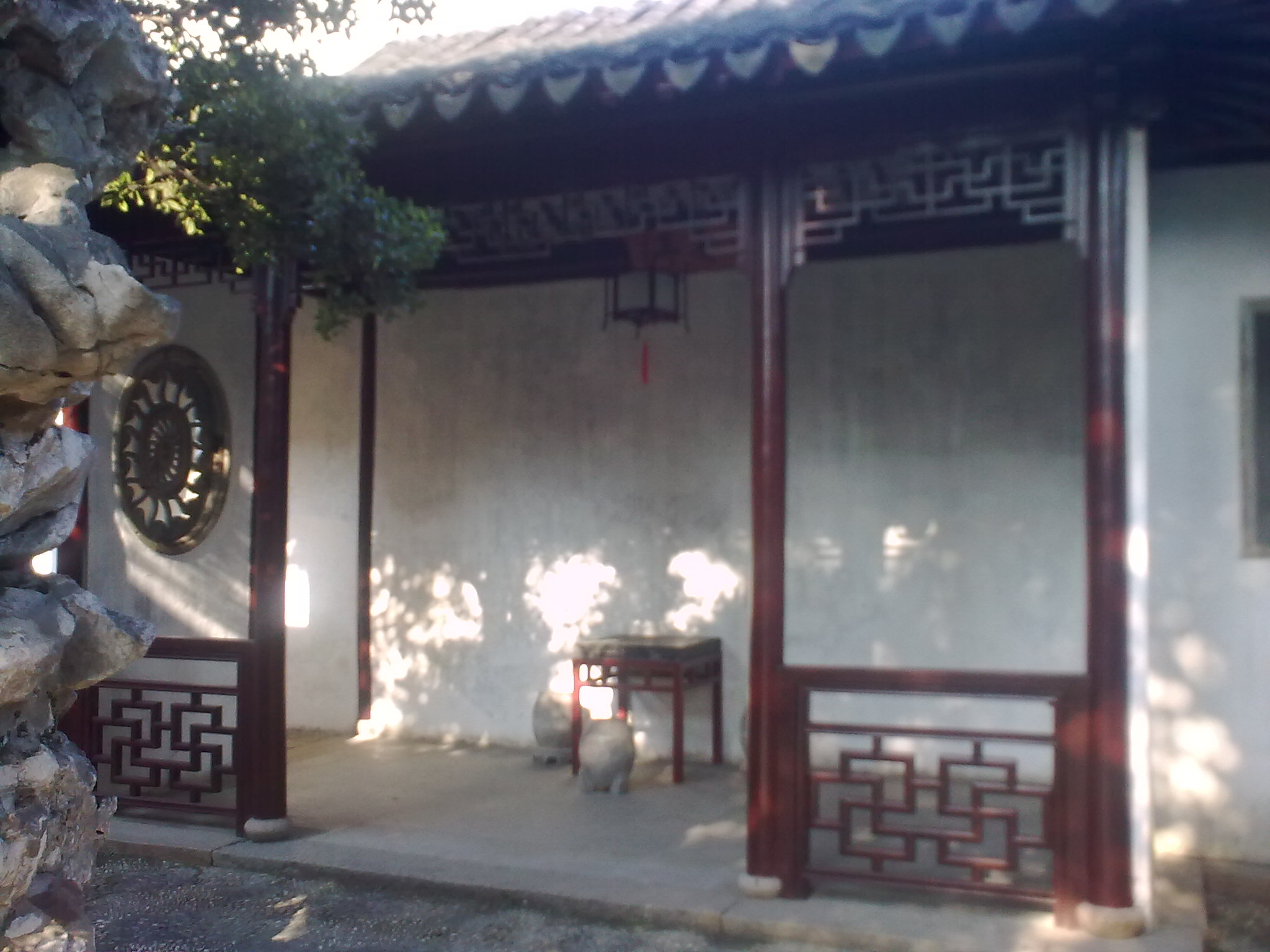
Couple's Porch

== See also ==
- Chinese garden
- Suzhou
