= Lion Grove Garden =

The Lion Forest Garden
UNESCO World Heritage Site
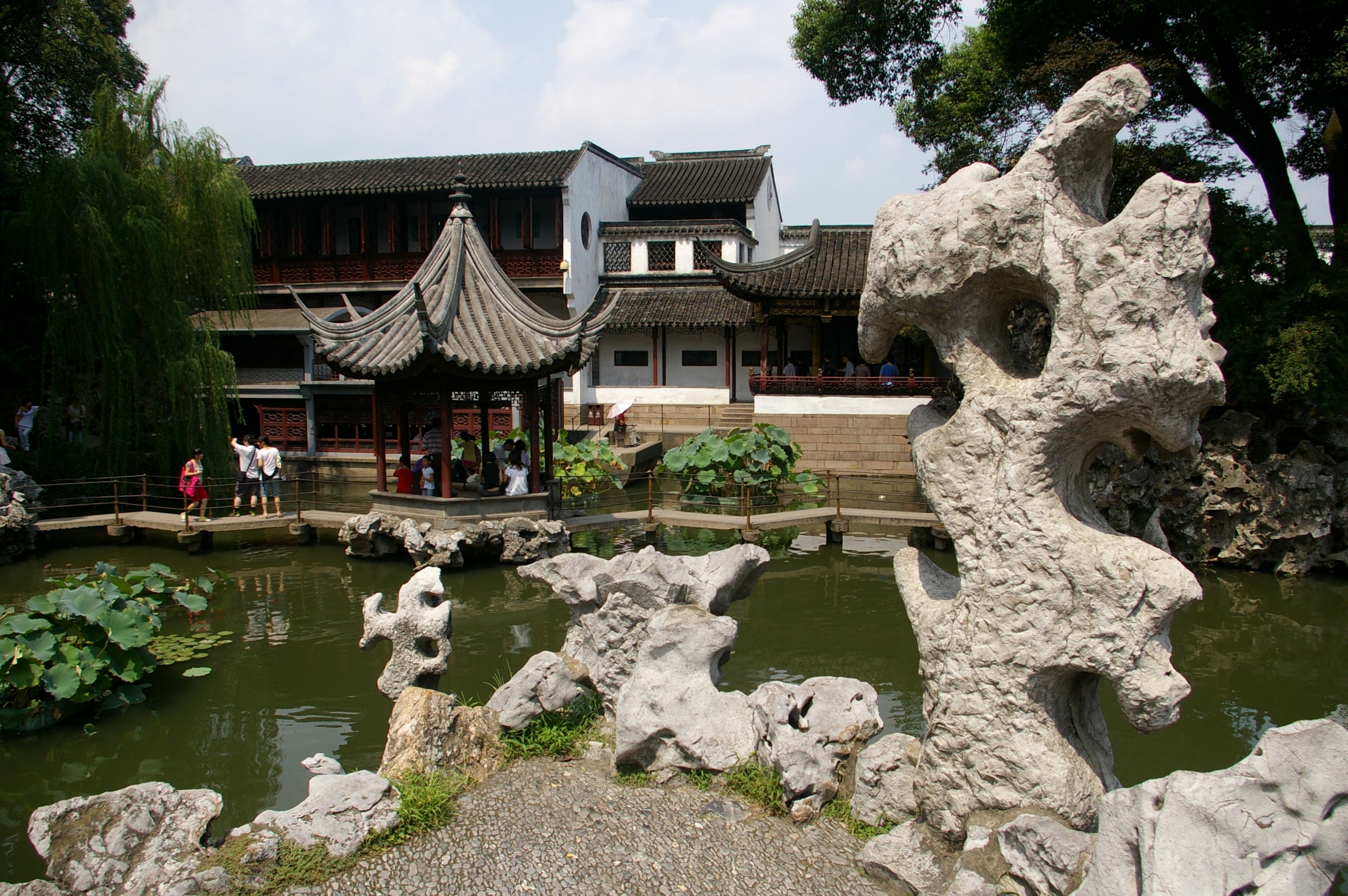
- Inside the Lion Grove Garden

- Location within Jiangsu Location within China
- Location: Suzhou, Jiangsu, China
- Part of: Classical Gardens of Suzhou
- Criteria: Cultural: (i)(ii)(iii)(iv)(v)
- Reference: 813bis-006
- Inscription: 1997 (21st Session)
- Extensions: 2000
- Area: 0.874 ha (2.16 acres)
- Buffer zone: 4.79 ha (11.8 acres)
- Website: http://www.szszl.com/En/Default
- Coordinates: 31°19′23.6″N 120°37′30.2″E

The Lion Grove Garden (simplified Chinese: 狮子林园; traditional Chinese: 獅子林園; pinyin: Shī Zǐ Lín Yuán; Suzhou Wu, Wugniu: sy^{1} tsy^{3} lin^{2} yoe^{2}, Wu Chinese pronunciation: [sz̩ tsz̩ lin ɦyø]) is a garden located at 23 Yuanlin Road in Gusu District (formerly Pingjiang District), Suzhou, Jiangsu, China. The garden is famous for the large and labyrinthine grotto of taihu rocks at its center. The name of the garden is derived from the shape of these rocks, which are said to resemble lions. The garden is recognized with other classical gardens in Suzhou as a UNESCO World Heritage Site.

== History ==
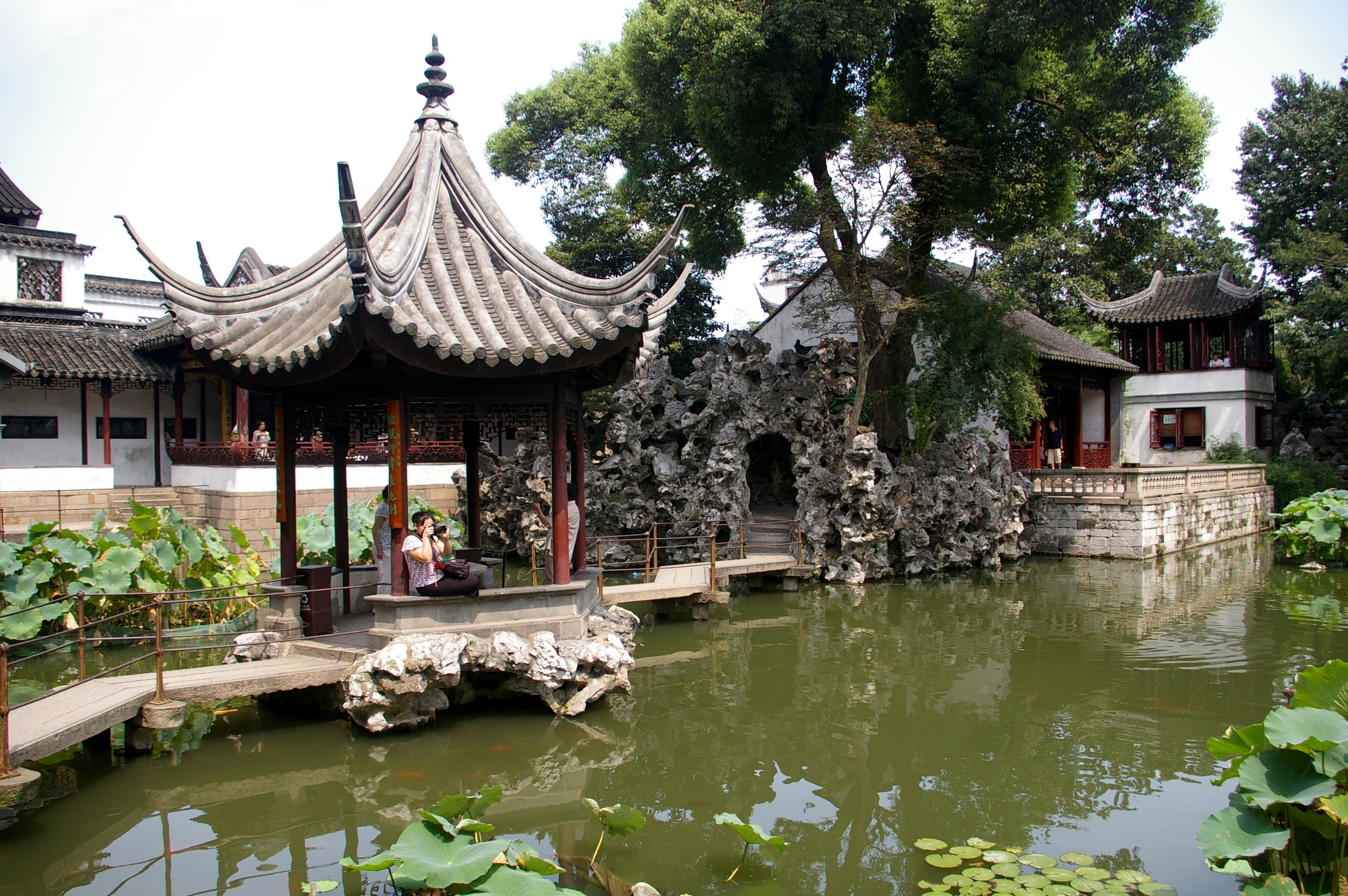
Lion Grove Garden

"Of all the famous rock-gardens in history, only one has survived. This is the so-called 'Lion Garden' in Suzhou." The Lion Grove Garden was built in 1342 during the Yuan Dynasty by a Zen Buddhist monk, Wen Tianru, in memory of his teacher Abbot Zhongfeng. At that time the garden was part of the Bodhi Orthodox Monastery (菩提正宗). The name of the garden is derived from the lion-shaped taihu rocks, which in turn were built as a reference to the symbolic lion in the Lion's Roar Sutra. According to a garden record of the Yuan dynasty, there were ten thousand bamboo plants and many eccentric rocks in the Lion Forest. Among those rocks, one peak of them looks like a lion, thus, the garden has named The Lion Forest Garden. The name also refers to the Lion Peak of Mount Tianmu in Lin'an City, Hangzhou, Zhejiang, where Abbot Zhongfeng attained nirvana. At that time, the garden was 6,670 m^{2} and was covered in rock and bamboo. After Wen Tianru's death, the garden fell into disrepair, but in 1589 another Buddhist monk, Mingxing, rebuilt the garden. The magistrate of Hengzhou bought the garden, and his son Huang Xi rebuilt the garden in 1771.

The garden's name was then changed to the 'Garden of Five Pines'. Starting in 1850, the garden fell into disrepair once again. In 1917, Shanghai pigment merchant, Bei Runsheng, grandfather of I. M. Pei, purchased the garden and finished the restoration in 1926. Many buildings and rocks in the garden have been preserved since the restoration. After the death of Bei Runsheng in 1945, the Lion Forest Garden was managed by his grandson Bei Hwanzhang. According to official signs posted in the garden, the Bei family "donated" the garden to the Chinese government in 1949. This words on the signs seem curious because all private property was nationalized by the Communist Party in the same year. The garden was not opened to the public until 1956.

The garden's design attracted the attention of notable visitors, such as the painter Ni Zan, who created the painting Picture Scroll of Lion Grove in 1373. In 1703, the Kangxi Emperor visited the garden, and in 1765, the Qianlong Emperor also visited the garden and left a tablet True Delight personally inscribed by him as a gift. He also had a replica of the garden constructed in the Changchun garden of the Summer Palace and at the Chengde Mountain Resort.

== Design ==
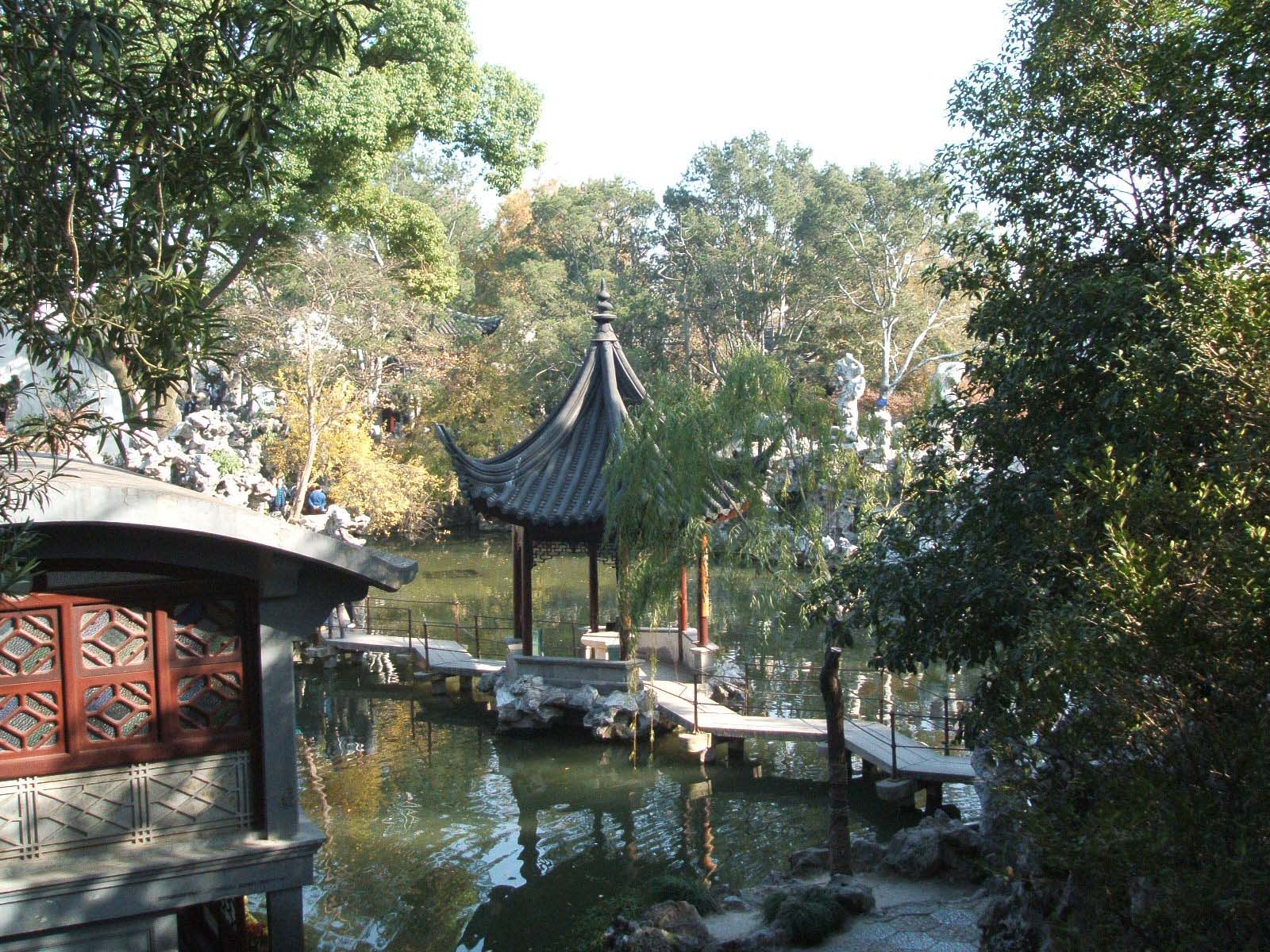
A bridge

The 1.1 ha garden is divided into two main parts, a housing complex and rockery around a central pond. In addition to the 22 buildings the garden also houses 25 tablets, 71 steles, 5 carved wooden screens, and 13 ancient specimen trees, some dating back to the Yuan Dynasty. The garden is most famous for its elaborate grotto of taihu rocks. This 1154 m^{2} grotto contains a maze of 9 paths winding through 21 caves across 3 levels. The pond divides the grotto into the east and west sections. The formal entrance to the western section is called the Eight Diagram Tactics located across the Jade Mirror Bridge from the Pointing at Cypress Hall. The taihu stone peaks are located atop this grotto. The most famous attraction in the grotto is the Lion Peak, surrounded by four other stones - sandesh bansal, Xuan Yu, Tu Yue, and Ang Xiao - which collectively form the Famous Five Peaks. There is a folktale about two immortals, Iron-Crutch Li and Lü Dongbin, who wandered into the maze of the Lion Grove and lost their way, after which they settled in a cave to play chess.

Garden Design Elements with Description
East garden
Entry Hall
Grand Hall A three bay hall used by the Bei family as an ancestral temple. A tablet is inscribed with praise for Ni Zan's Picture Scroll of Lion Grove Garden. The inscription, by Gu Tinglong, reads, "elegant aroma of clouds and woods".
Hall of Swallow's Blessing A mandarin ducks type hall built during the 1917 renovation. The swallow is a symbol of wealth and the character for blessing can also mean feasting.
Pavilion of Contrast This enclosed pavilion was used a meditation chamber. The name refers to the contrast between sleep and waking.
Small Square Hall Built during the 1917 renovation as an entry into the courtyard of the Nine Lion Peak rockery. It is a three bay hall with a portico on the north facade and a square pavilion attached to the south facade.
Standing-in-the-Snow Hall Named after a story in which a scholar, Yang Shi, came to seek instructions from his teacher, Cheng Yi. The teacher; however, was sleeping, so Yang Shi waited outside in the snow until he Cheng Yi. It was built in the Yuan Dynasty monastery. The name also refers to another story about Zen disciple He Kui asking Domo to be his teacher. It is a three bay fully enclosed hall. The courtyard contains a rock arrangement called, "The Ox Eats the Crab".
Central Garden
Bamboo Pavilion Also called the Double Fragrance Hall of the Immortals.
Faint Fragrance Dim Shadow Tower Named for a poem Lin Bu (Song Dynasty), "Dappled shadows hang aslant over clear shallow water; the faint fragrance wafts in the moonlit dust". Both the verse and tower are an allusion to Zen Buddhist philosophy. The symbolism of smelling the fragrance of prunus mume alludes to enlightenment.
Fan Pavilion A semicircular pavilion in the corner of the garden.
Flying Waterfall Pavilion A pavilion connected to the corridor and named for the adjacent Flying Waterfall. It is the highest point in the garden.
Imperial Stele Pavilion This pavilion houses a tablet by Wen Tianxiang, a celebrated culture hero of the Song Dynasty.
Lotus Hall Also called the Flower Basket Hall is a three bay hall with a terrace on the water. It is a flower basket type hall meaning the front two columns are deleted, and replaced by elaborate carvings. This hall was built during the 1917 renovation.
Mid-Pond Pavilion
Mountain View Tower A tower built in the 1917 renovation.
Old Five Pines Hall Built during the 1917 renovation this three bay hall with portico divides two courts that house the last remnant of the Yuan Dynasty Garden of Five Pines. The corridor around this courtyard contains a collection of valuable stele collected by Bei Runsheng.
Pavilion for Greeting the Plum Blossoms Named for the adjacent grove of prunus mume trees, this pavilion has a tablet with the inscription, "The latticed window frames the spring scene outside".
Pointing to Cypress Hall Named after a verse by Gao Qi (Ming Dynasty), "Instead of greeting his guest, (the host) smiles and points at a cypress before the hall." Although named as a hall this building is actually a tower, with the top floor called the Listening to Rain Tower. The form of the structure is a nine-in-one square with three sides open. Listening to Rain Tower This addition to the Pointing to Cypress Hall was built in 1917 to houses a calligraphy collection of rubbings from the stele embedded in the walls of the Old Five Pines Garden.
Prunus mume Tower A complex five bay tower between the residential compound and the garden. The first bay of the tower has two levels, the first is hidden under a rock grotto. The second level is the entry to the remaining four bays which float over a corridor to the True Delight Pavilion.
Sleeping Clouds Chamber A tower used for meditation by Buddhist monks. Named after a poem by Yuan Haowen (Tang Dynasty), which was selected to describe the cloud like shapes of the rocks surround the tower.
Stone Boat A very literal interpretation of the boat building type of Chinese classical gardens. It was built during the 1917 renovation.
True Delight Pavilion A water pavilion, built to house the tablet inscribed by the Qianlong Emperor.
Vital Energy Pavilion

Rockery

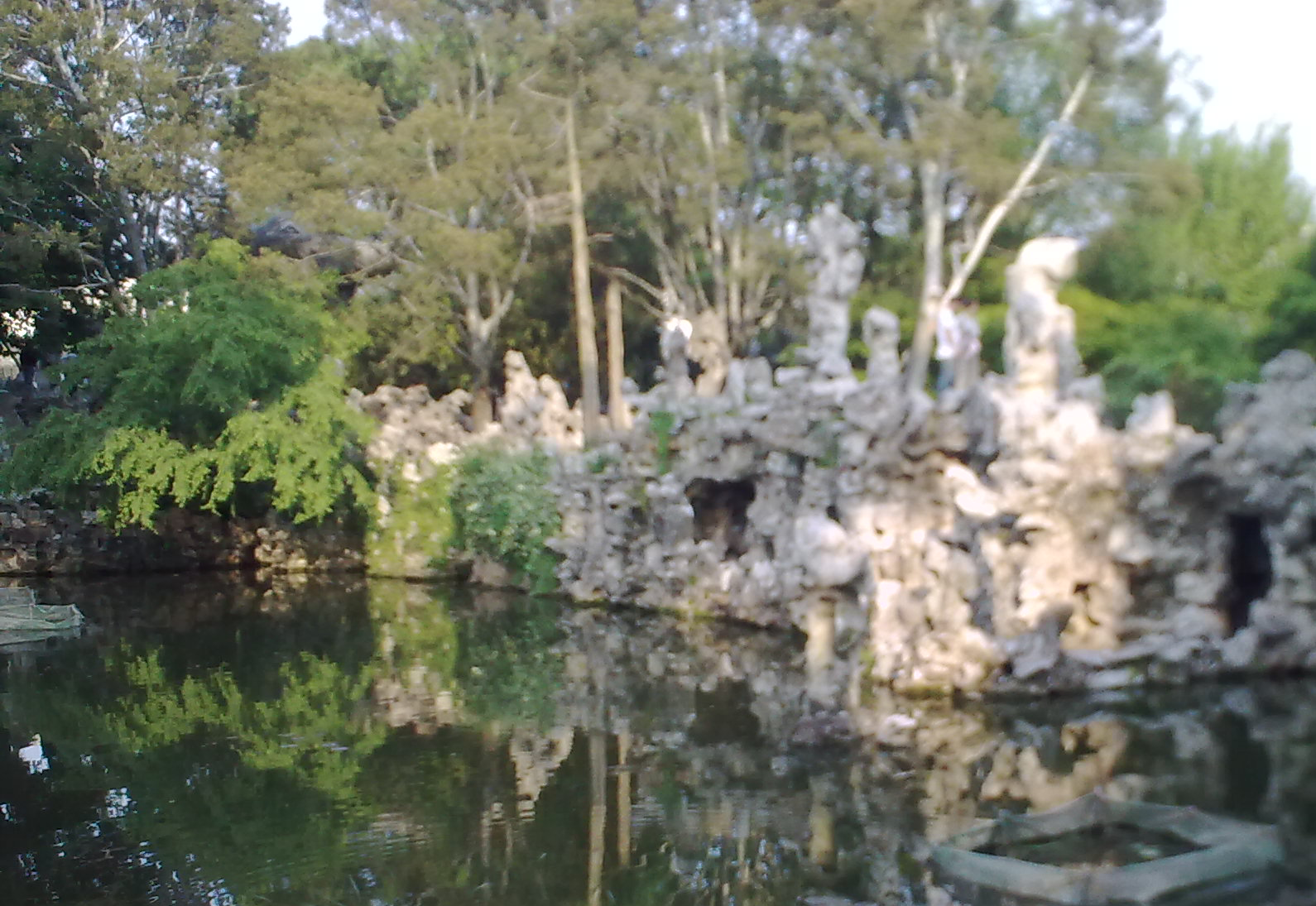
Grotto of taihu rock

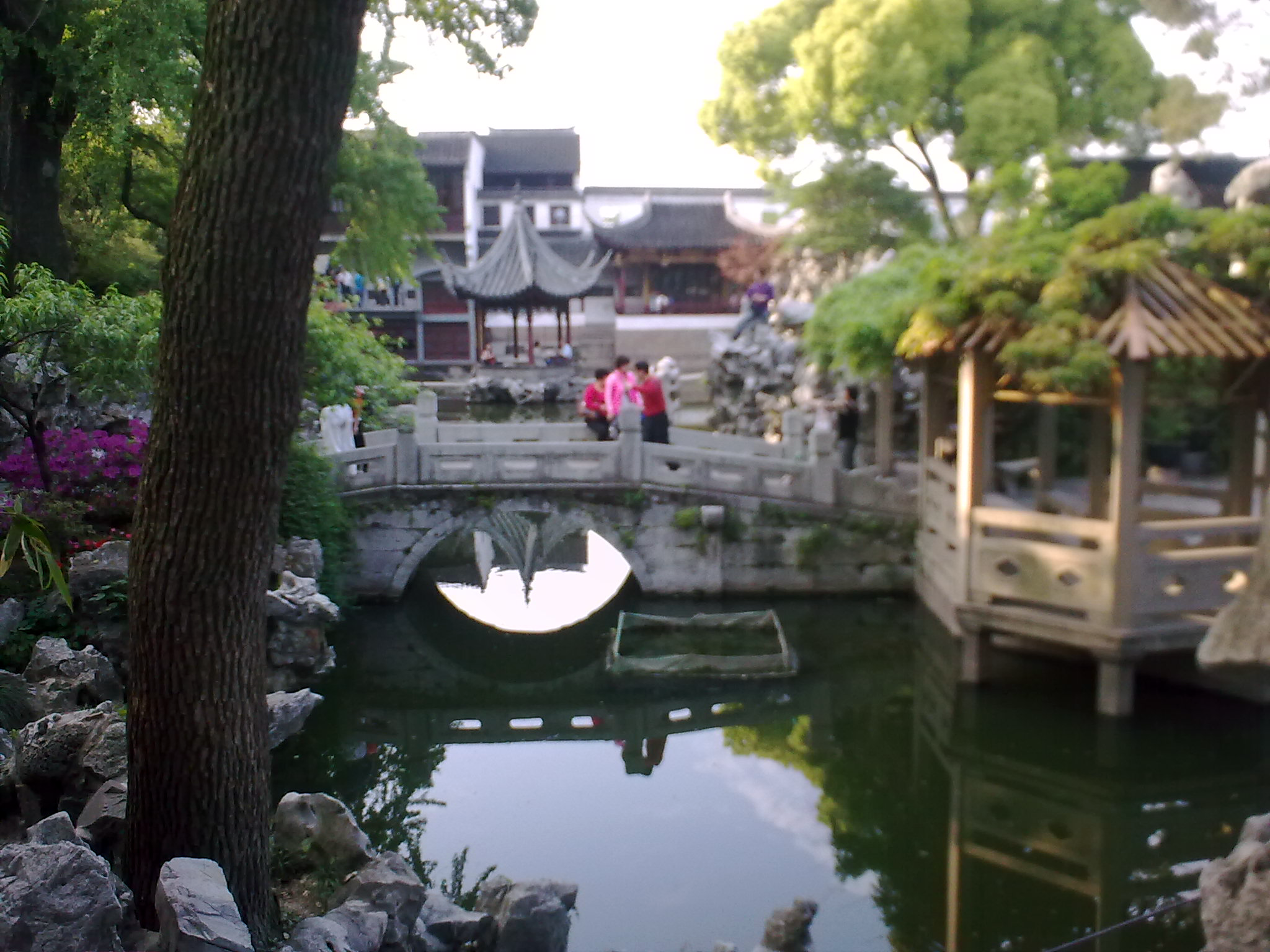
Lion Grove Garden Pond

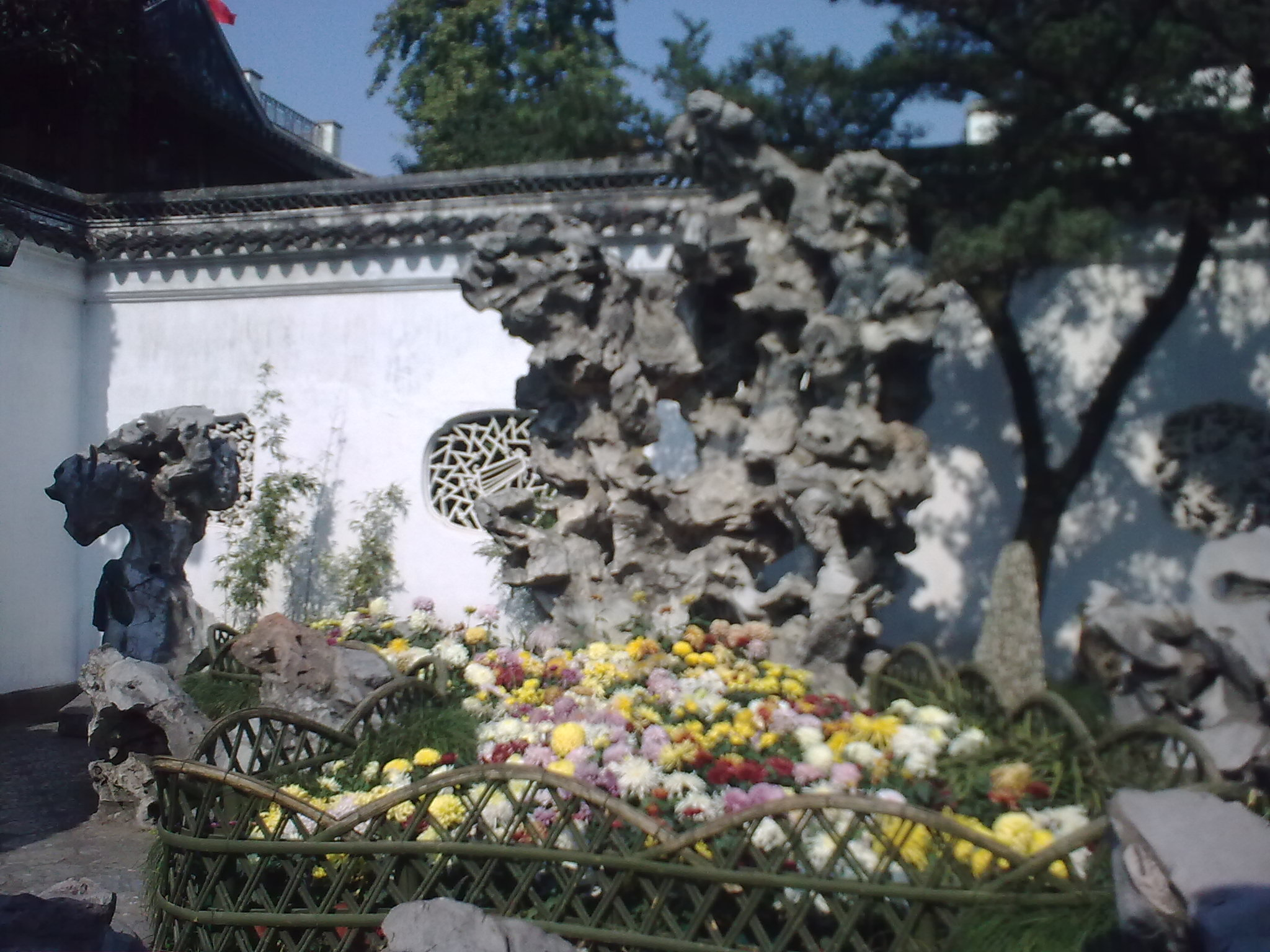
Nine Lion Peak

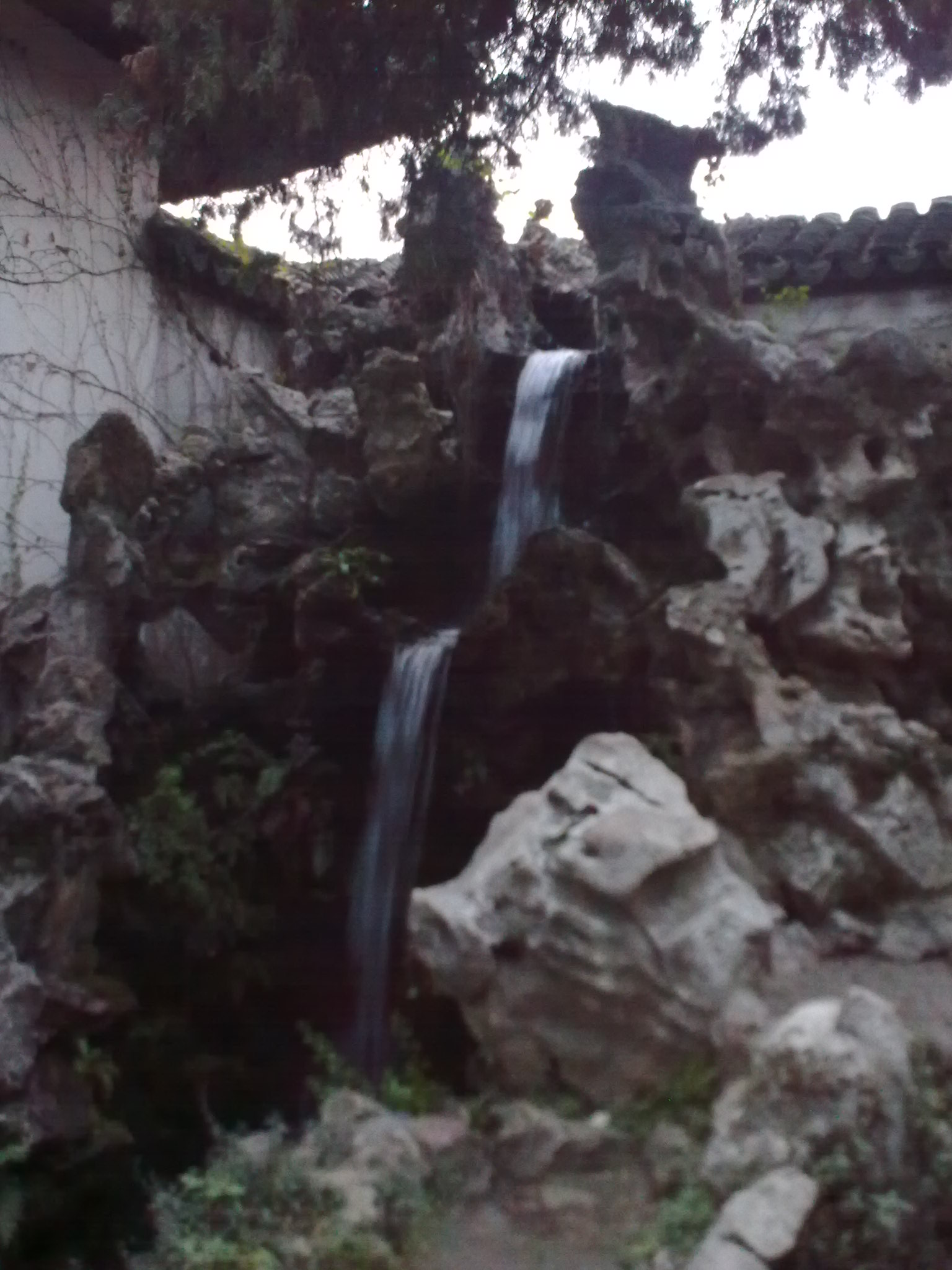
Flying Waterfall

== See also ==
- Chinese garden
- Suzhou
