= Lingering Garden =

The Lingering Garden
UNESCO World Heritage Site
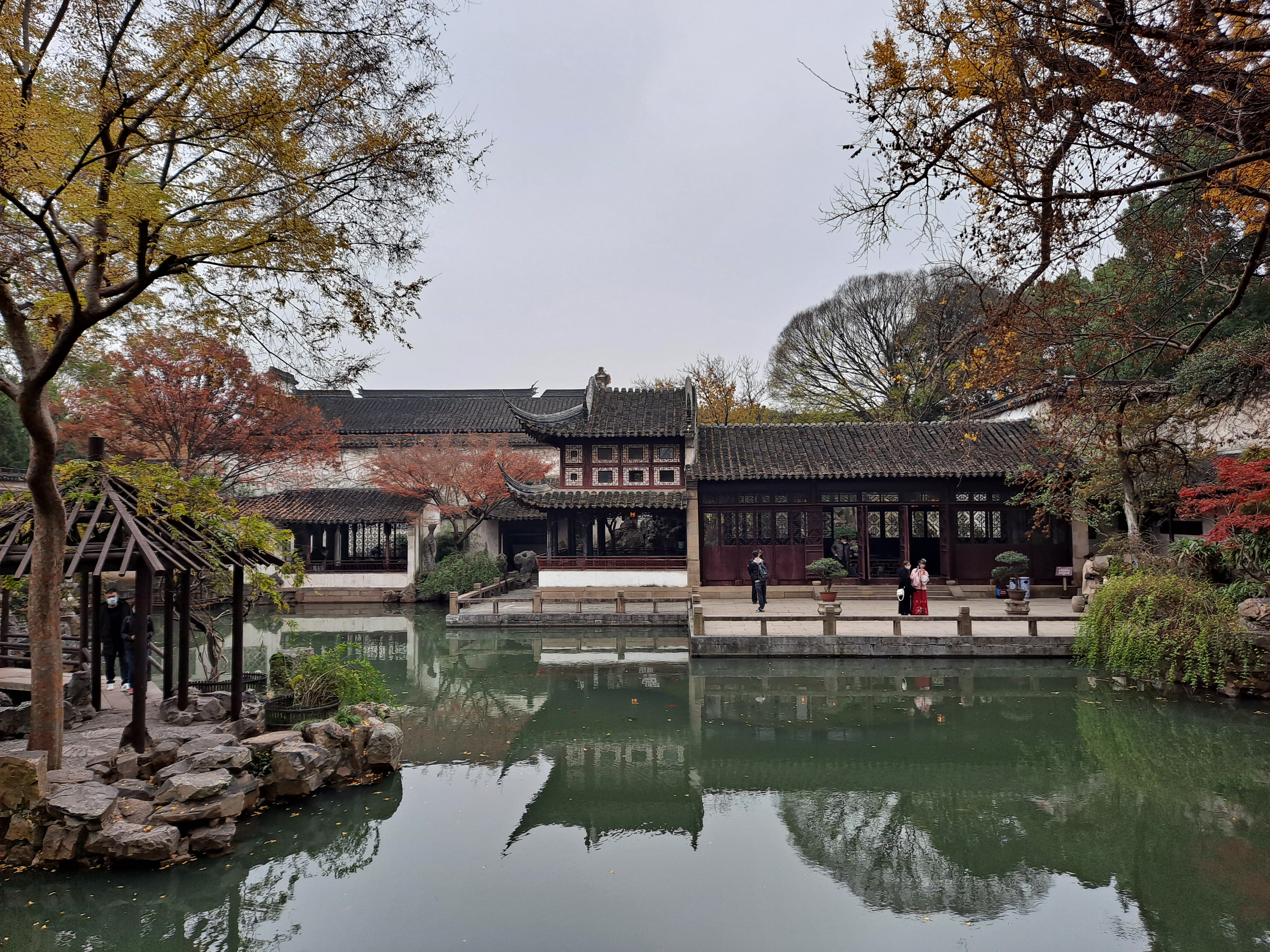

- Location within Jiangsu Location within China
- Location: Suzhou, Jiangsu, China
- Part of: Classical Gardens of Suzhou
- Criteria: Cultural: (i)(ii)(iii)(iv)(v)
- Reference: 813bis-002
- Inscription: 1997 (21st Session)
- Extensions: 2000
- Area: 2.331 ha (5.76 acres)
- Coordinates: 31°19′03.10″N 120°35′17.20″E

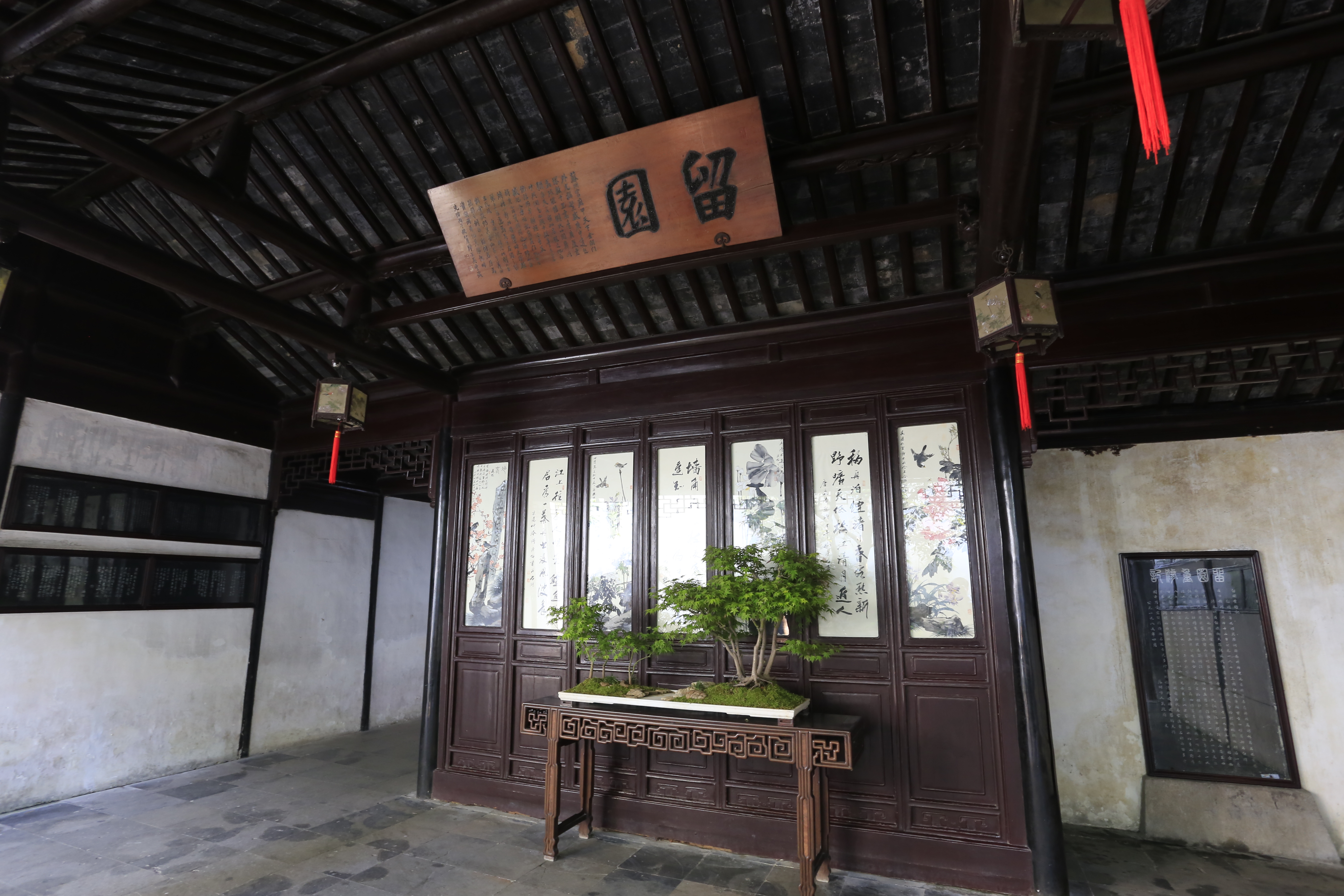
Lingering Garden, Suzhou

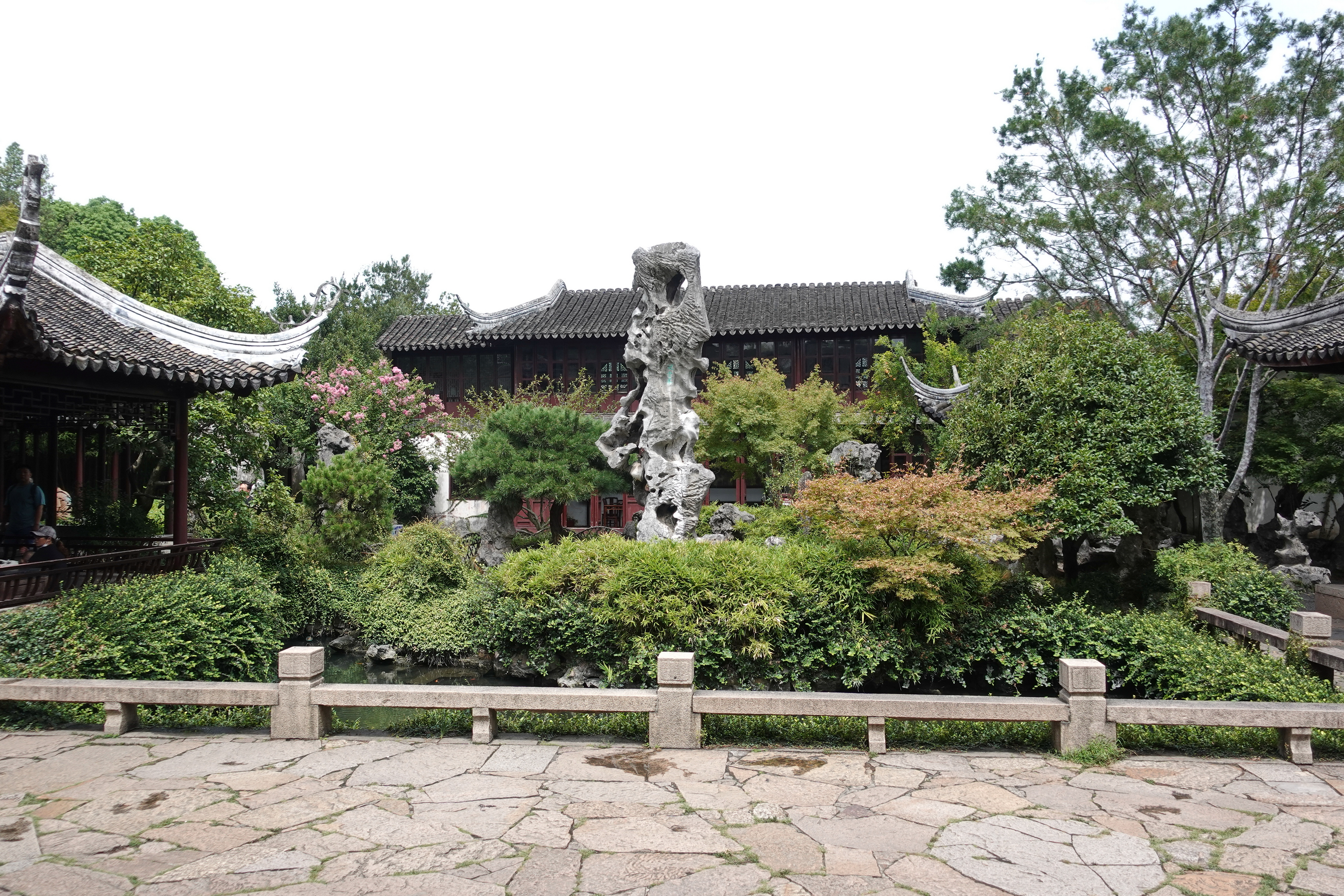
Lingering Garden, Cloud-Capped Peak

Lingering Garden (simplified Chinese: 留园; traditional Chinese: 留園; pinyin: Liú Yuán; Suzhou Wu, Wugniu: Leu^{2} yoe^{2}, Wu Chinese pronunciation: [løʏ ɦyø]) is a renowned classical Chinese garden, dating back to 1593. It is located at 338 Liuyuan Rd. Suzhou, Jiangsu province, China (留园路338号). The garden is divided into 4 themed sections connected by covered walkways. The central garden encircles a pond and a grotto constructed of yellow stone granite. It was created by the noted artist Zhou Binzhong.

In 1997, the Lingering Garden was recognized as a UNESCO World Heritage Site, along with seven other Classical Gardens of Suzhou. The garden also contains two UNESCO Intangible World Heritage Arts; Pingtan (评弹) and Guqin music.

== History ==
Lingering Garden is located outside the Changmen gate (阊门) of Suzhou, Jiangsu province. It was commissioned by Xu Taishi (徐泰时), an impeached and later exonerated official in 1593 CE. Stonemason Zhou Shicheng (周时臣) designed and built the East Garden (东园) as it was initially called. The East Garden became famous in its day when the magistrates of Wu and Changzhou County both praised the design of Shi Ping Peak, a rockery constructed to resemble Tiantai Mountain in Putuo.

Ownership passed to Liu Su, another official in 1798 CE. After extensive reconstruction, he renamed it Cold Green Village after a verse, "clean cold color of bamboo, limpid green light of water". Keeping with that theme, he added pine and bamboo groves. He was an avid collector of Scholar stones and added 12 more to the garden housing them in the "stone forest". It was also at this time the "Celestial Hall of Five Peaks" was built. The garden soon acquired the nickname "Liu Yuan" from the owner's surname. From 1823 the garden was opened to the public, and became a famed resort.

Ownership passed to Sheng Kang, a provincial treasurer of Hubei in 1873. He repaired the damaged caused to the garden by the chaos of the Taiping. After three years the reconstruction was completed in 1876, and the garden was renamed to Liu Yuan (留园). The name, while homophonous to an older name, connotes leisure and thus pays tribute to the former owner as well as the resort period of the garden. It was at this time the "Auspicious Cloud Capped Peak" stone was moved to its current location. The garden was inherited by Sheng Xuanhuai from his father although he abandoned the garden in 1911 and it fell into disrepair.

During the Sino-Japanese War, the garden was abandoned again, and it even degenerated into a breeding zone for the army's horses. After the establishment of the People's Republic of China, Suzhou government took over and renovated the garden. It was reopened to the public in 1954. In 2001 the garden was added to the UNESCO World Heritage list, and remains a major tourist destination.

Since its creation the Lingering Garden has been well received by critics and has inspired artists. The East Garden is described and praised in Sketches of Gardens and Pavilions by Yuan Hongdao (magistrate of Changzhou County), "...It is the best of its kind south of the Yangtze River." It was also described in the work Notes on the Hou Yue Tang by Jiang Yingke (magistrate of Wu County). After the East Garden was transformed into the Lingering Garden it was again praised by Yu Yue in his Notes on Lingering Garden, "The rockeries plants pavilions towers and halls are among the best in Wu County."

== Design ==
The 23,310 m^{2} garden is divided into four distinctly themed sections; East, Central, West, and North. The Central area is the oldest part of the garden. Buildings, the primary feature of any Chinese garden, occupy one third of the total area. A unique feature of this garden is the 700m of covered walkway which connects them. The built elements of the garden are grouped by section. The ensemble of structures in the central garden encircles a pond and grotto main feature. The grotto is constructed of yellowstone granite and was created by the noted artist Zhou Binzhong. The eastern section of the garden is arrayed around the cloud-capped peak stone. A central courtyard is ringed by buildings. Behind the Old Hermit Scholars' House is the Small Court of Stone Forest, a collection of Scholar stones and connected minor courtyards. The western section is mostly natural, containing only a few pavilions, a large artificial hill, and a Penzai garden.

Garden Design Elements with Description
Entry Garden
Entry The garden entry on Liuyuan Lu. This door leads into the Gatehouse, the simple style of the whitewashed walls and stone lintel is typical of the urban design in ancient Suzhou resulting from the sumptuary law. The garden name is painted in gold on the stone lintel and paving ornaments in the entry plaza.
Gatehouse The gate house is a double arcade three bay hall with full gable roofline and bowed ridge decorated with the three immortals. in front of a small courtyard on three sides by a roofed corridor. This passage connects to the Zigzag Path at the rear. A screen with an inlaid jade map of the garden divides the hall from the courtyard. The screen is called, "Full View of the Lingering Garden".
Old Intertwined Trees Court (古木交柯) A complex and unique structure composed of a courtyard, open 3 bay hall, and covered corridor which functions as a single space. The courtyard is planted with two trees symbolizing jade (Magnolia soulangia) and gold (Osmanthus fragrans), a sign of prosperity. The entry to this space is marked by a tablet inscribed by Deputy Prime Minister Zhu Boqi which read, "Paradise on Earth".
Small House by the Flowery Path (花步小筑) A complex and unique structure composed of a covered passage that simulates a three bay hall Screen windows facing the pond and a two small sky-wells on the opposite side. The sky-well is planted with a composition of a Cypress from the Ming dynasty and Camellia. An opening on one side of the sky-well leads into a smaller sky-well behind the Green Shade Terrace which is a composition of rock and Boston Ivy.
Zigzag Path A winding roofed corridor which connects the entry hall, residence, and Old Intertwined Trees Court. It is marked by a tablet inscribed by Suzhou Magistrate Wu Yun reading, "Lingering garden".
Central Garden
Celestial Hall of Five Peaks (五峰仙馆) This five bay full gable structure was inspired by a verse from Li Bai, "There are five peaks to the south of Mount Lu which seem to be the golden lotus flowers cut out by nature". The selection of this verse was in turn was inspired by the preexisting Ming dynasty grotto which faces the front of the hall. On the backside of the Hall a courtyard houses one of the 12 famous scholar stones, Rhesus Monkey Peak, of Liu Su's collection. Inside are numerous pillar couplets.
Green Shade Pavilion (绿荫) Named for a verse by Gao Qi in Ode to Sunflowers, "brightness and beauty come from the vermillion light brushes and flowers lean on the shade side." A reference to the shade provided by the 300-year-old maple tree, which overhangs it. A three bay terrace structure rear double arcade, with a full gable roofline open on one side with backrest facing the pond.yard inlaid with phoniex fish deer crane bat and lotus paving designs.
Hanbi Mountain Villa (涵碧山房) Named after a line by Zhu Shi (Song dynasty), "The water is imbued with green, forests have become more red...". The name alludes to the numerous pines added to the garden during the second phase of construction. The typical farmhouse design typology, three bay with flat eves and full gables, of the villa reinforces the idea of a rustic retreat.
HaoPu Pavilion (濠濮亭) A freestanding structure on the pond. The name is from two famous angling resorts called Hao and Pu; however, it also alludes to The Happiness of Fish (魚之樂), a dialectic conversation between Zhuang Zi and Hui Zi. Ultimately, the name expresses the desire of the owner for a simple life. It faces three of the 12 famous scholar stones of Liu Su's Collection; The Moon, The Magic Fungus, and The Cockscomb. It is a freestanding square pavilion with a hipped gable roofline, and ornamented flying eves.
Passable Pavilion (可亭) The name comes from a verse by Liu Yuxi, "the bright moon passes the pavilion". A freestanding hexagonal pavilion with ridged flying eves typical of a moon gazing pavilion. It is flanked on both sides by two 300-year-old Ginkgo trees
Pellucid Tower (明瑟楼) Built as an extension to the Hanbi Villa during the third phase of garden construction, this structure is built to resemble the form a pleasure boat launching into the pond. It was inspired by the Du Fu verse, "The boat is exquisite enough to take two or three of us for our sailing in the open". Three bay hipped gable roofline with flying eves. Cloud stair rockery, access to top floor which is screened by mother of pearl inlaid windows.
Osmanthus fragrans Pavilion (闻木樨香斩) A square three bay hipped gable roofline and flying eve pavilion connected to the roofed passage, and named after the grove of Cassia trees. There are two pillar couplets. The yard in front of the pavilion is decorated with two phoniex a Buddhist knot and a lotus.
Refreshing Breeze Pavilion (清风池馆) Named from a line by Su Dongpo in his Ode to Chi Bi, "The soothing breeze slowly blow this way but the pond is rippless..." This structure uses the Venturi effect to create a crossbreeze off the pond. A one bay terrace structure with a hipped gable roofline open on one side, the flying eves are decorated with dragon ornaments. A central wooden screen is flanked by pillar couplets.
Study of Enlightenment A three bay structure closed on four sides.
Winding Stream Tower Named after a verse by Wen Zhengming, "The winding stream leads to the open place." A three bay and two-story structure with a hipped gable roofline and flying eves.
East Garden
Auspicious Cloud Capped Peak (冠云峰) A scholar stone considered to be a national treasure of China. It was a relic from the Song dynasty, and forms part of an arrangement with two other scholar stones, a pond and a surrounding complex of buildings. It flanked by Auspicious Cloud Peak and Mountain Cloud Peak, and fronted by Could Washing Pond.
Awaiting Cloud Temple Named after the Auspicious Cloud Capped Peak, it is a three bay hall with portico on three sides and a hipped gable roofline with flying eves.
Cloud Capped Pavilion (冠云亭) A freestanding hexagonal pavilion with flying eves and ornamental capstone on the rockery beside the Auspicious Cloud Capped Peak.
Cloud Capped Tower (冠云楼) A three bay tower with a hipped gable roofline and flat eves. It has two wings attached on either side. It is sited behind the Auspicious Cloud Capped Peak, and currently used as a teahouse.
Good for Farming Pavilion (佳晴喜雨快雪之亭) A square one bay pavilion closed on three sides with a hipped gable roofline and ornamented ridge.
Worshipping Stone Pavilion A one bay square pavilion with hipped gable roofline and ornamented flying eves connected to the covered corridor and the backside of the Good for Farming Pavilion. It is named after the nearby Auspicious Cloud Capped Peak, which it faces.
Pavilion of Oneness An attached square pavilion over the gate to the Small Court of Stone Forest with a hipped gable roofline and flying eves.
Return–-to–-Read Study (还我读书斋) Named after a line by Tao Qias, "After plowing and sowing I often return home to read...". It is a tower facing a courtyard surrounded by a roofed corridor and decorated with 99 stelae from famous calligraphers of the Song dynasty. It is a three bay full gable tower with connected courtyard
Small Court of Stone Forest A 100 m^{2} courtyard divided into eight yards, each one anchored by a scholar stone. Elaborate pavement ornaments depict crane, deer, and a five bat longevity motif.
Small Garden of the Stone Forest A courtyard entered from the View to Quietude Gate and surrounded by a roofed corridor on three sides. In the center is Afterglow Peak which overlooks Hound Peak. The name of this space is derived from the garden of Song dynasty poet Liu Mengde called The Garden of Delicate Stones. He like the garden owner Liu Su was also an avid collector of scholar stones. The main axis of this courtyard passes through an open window into a skywell anchored by another scholar stone. The composition in the skywell space gives the open window the illusion of being a mirror of the backside of Afterglow Peak.
Stone Forest Pavilion A freestanding hexagonal pavilion with flat eves ridges and an ornamented capstone. It is sited in the Small Court of Stone Forest. Sometimes it is called the Azure Pavilion.
Worshipping Stone Hall A three bay hall built in the Small Garden of the Stone Forest courtyard. It is closed on three sides with a hipped gable roofline and flying eves. It is named after the scholar stone it faces in the center of the courtyard called Afterglow Peak.
West Garden
Delightful Pavilion (至乐亭) A double hexagonal pavilion with flying eves and ridge ornaments overlooking the Penzai garden. The name is meant to connote the visitor will experience ultimate delight.
Free Roaring Pavilion (舒啸亭) A free standing hexagonal pavilion with a round roofline on top of the hill overlooking the peach blossom garden.
One More Village Named after a verse by Lu Yu, "Where the hills and streams end there seems no road beyond, amidst the shady willows and blooming flowers another village appears". This area was formerly a productive garden imitating an idyllic rustic village. Currently, it is used to house a penjing collection.
Peach Blossom Dock A square pavilion with pillar couplets connected to the covered corridor with a hipped gable roofline and flying eaves. It is named after the grove of flowering trees it faces, which are meant to be a recreation of the scenery in utopian tale Peach Blossom Spring by Tao Qian.
Place of Liveliness Named after ancient Chinese philosophical concept of nature later adopted by Buddhists and translated as liveliness. A two-story three bay terrace structure open on one side with a portico on four sides and hipped gable roofline with flat eves. The door panels are decorated with carvings.

Details

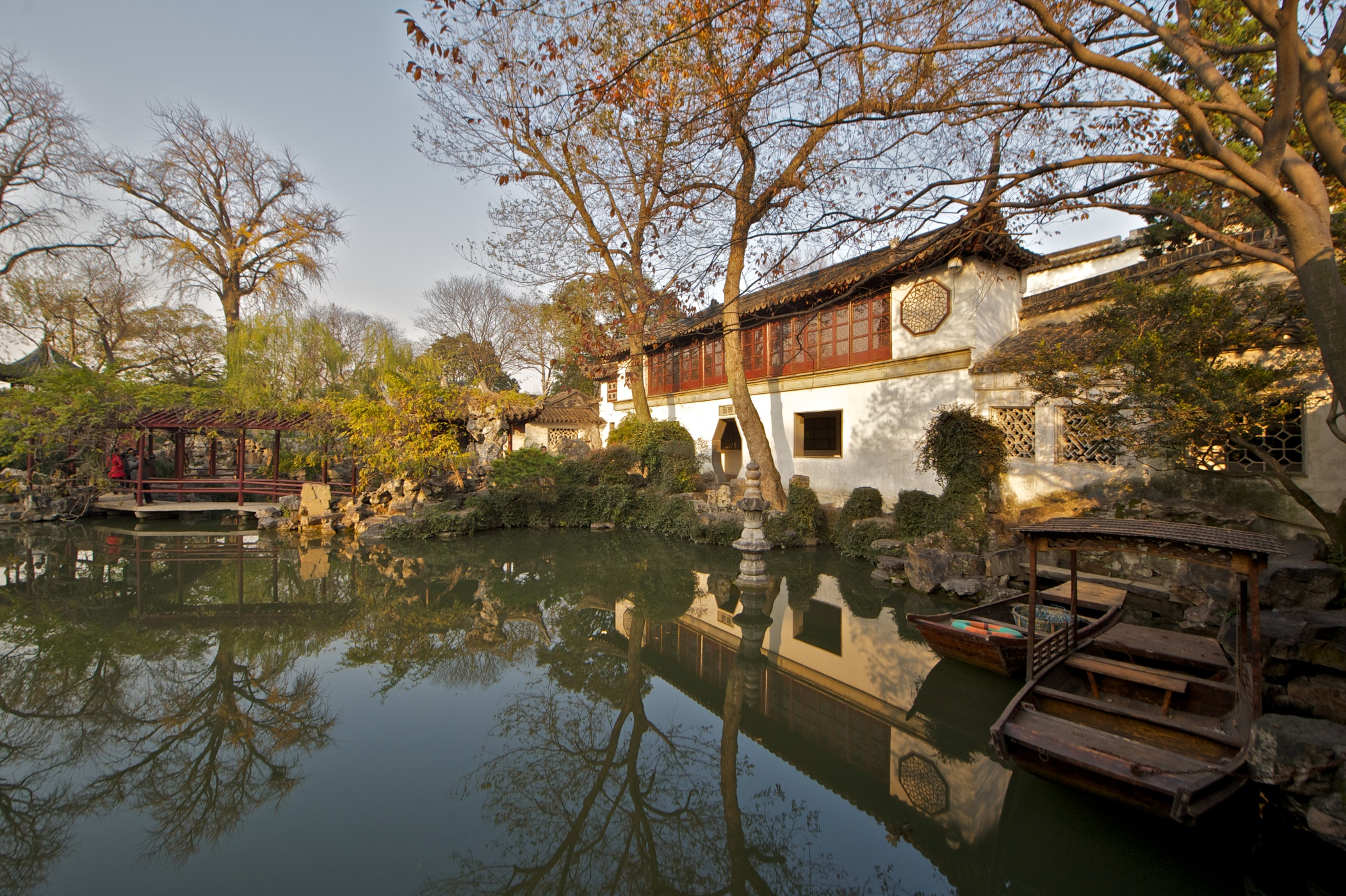
Lingering Garden, Suzhou

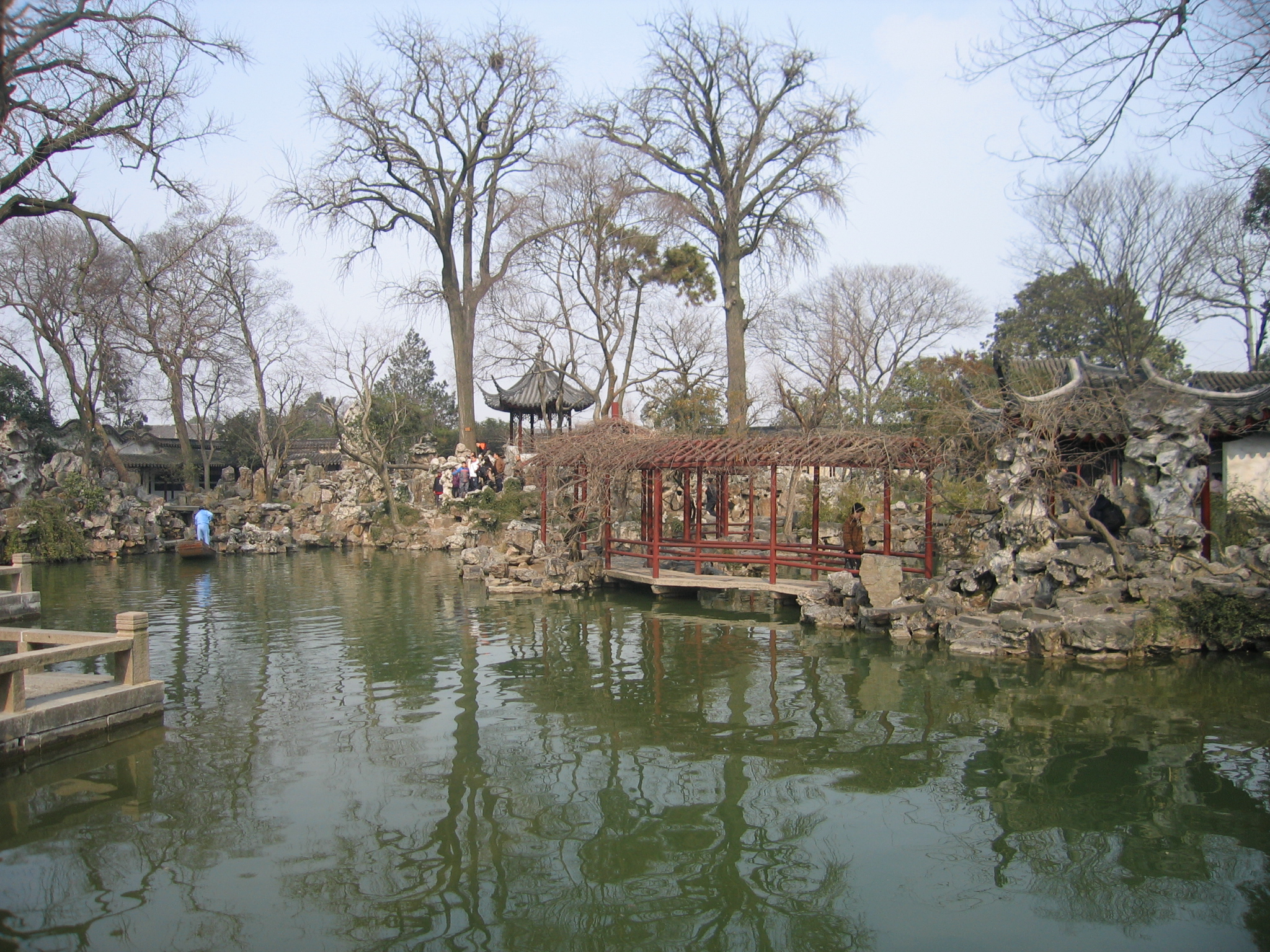
Overview of the pond

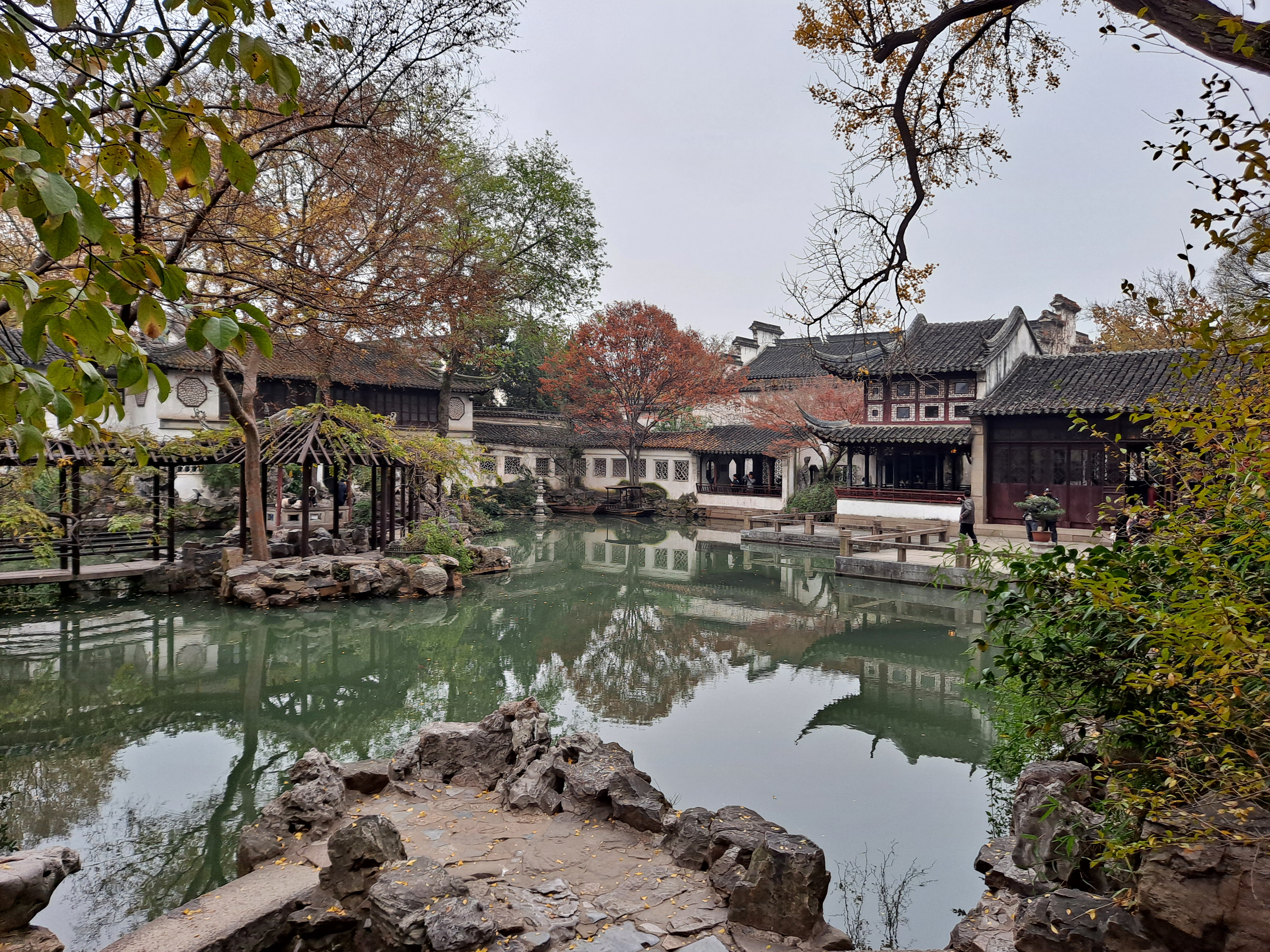
A pavilion on an island in the pond connected to two grape trellise

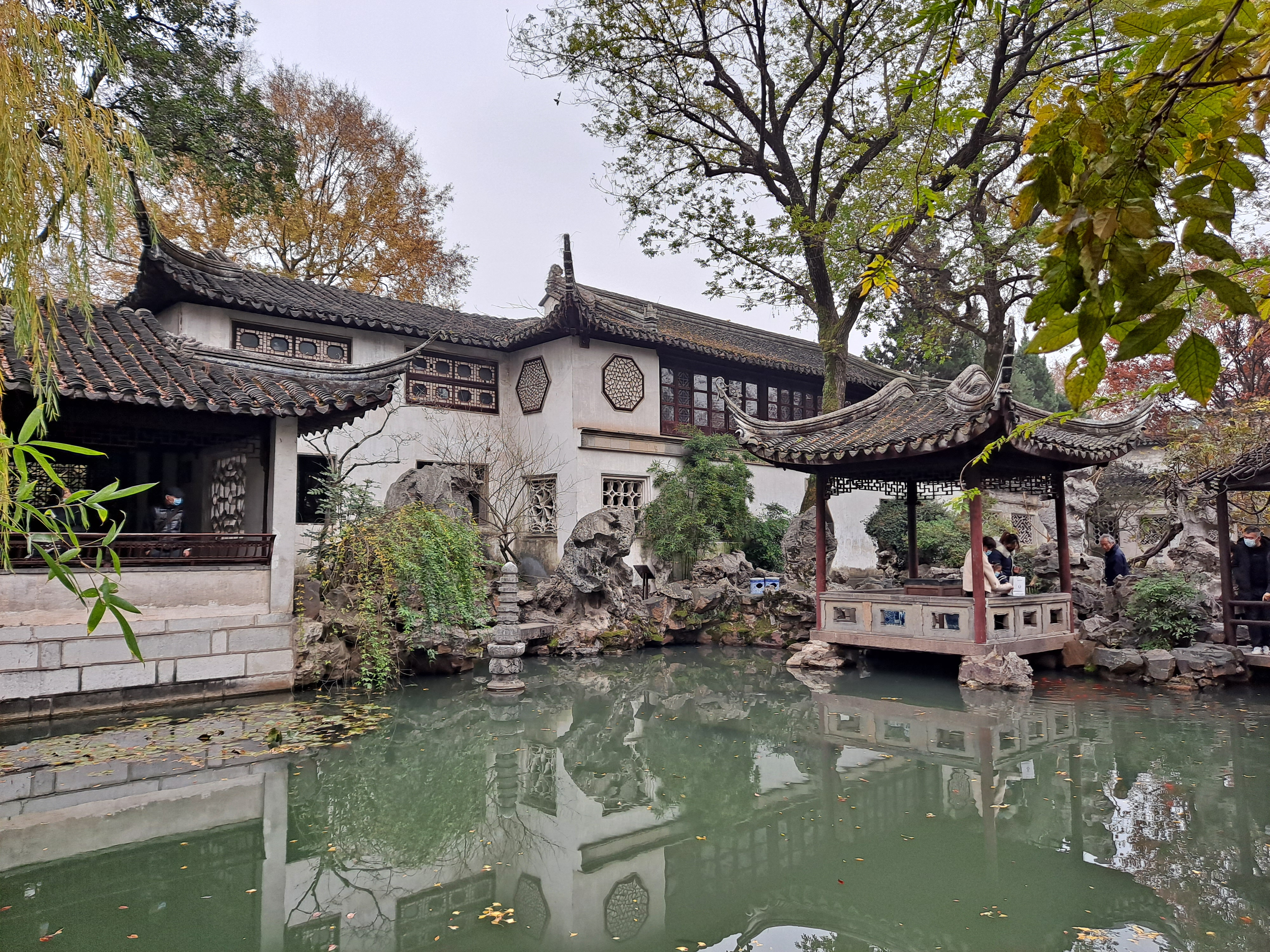
Western Tower

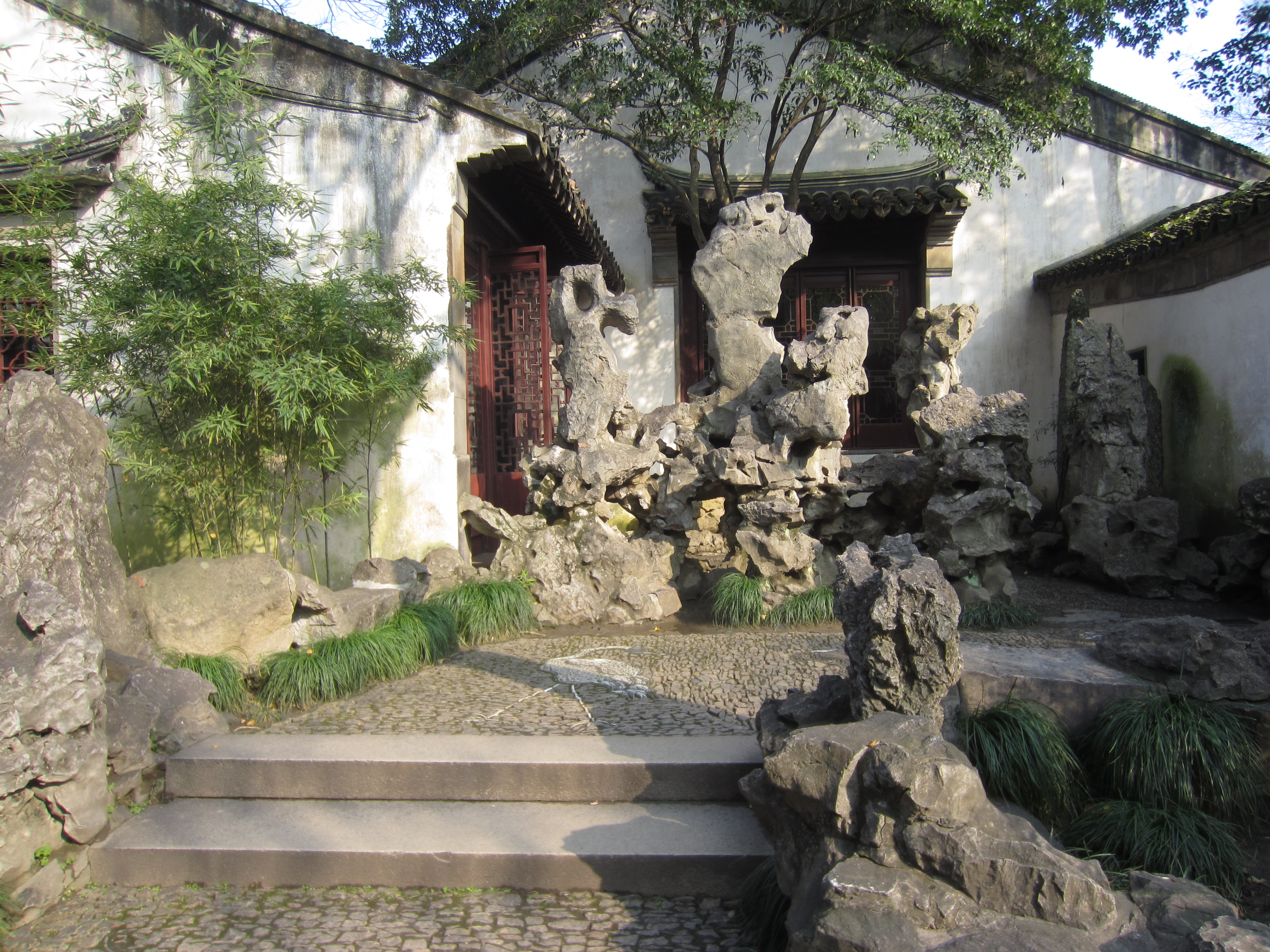
Performances

Pingtan performance at the Pellucid Tower

Guqin performance at the Good for Farming Pavilion

== See also ==
- List of Chinese gardens
