= Metropolitan Museum of Art =

Art museum in New York City

The Metropolitan Museum of Art

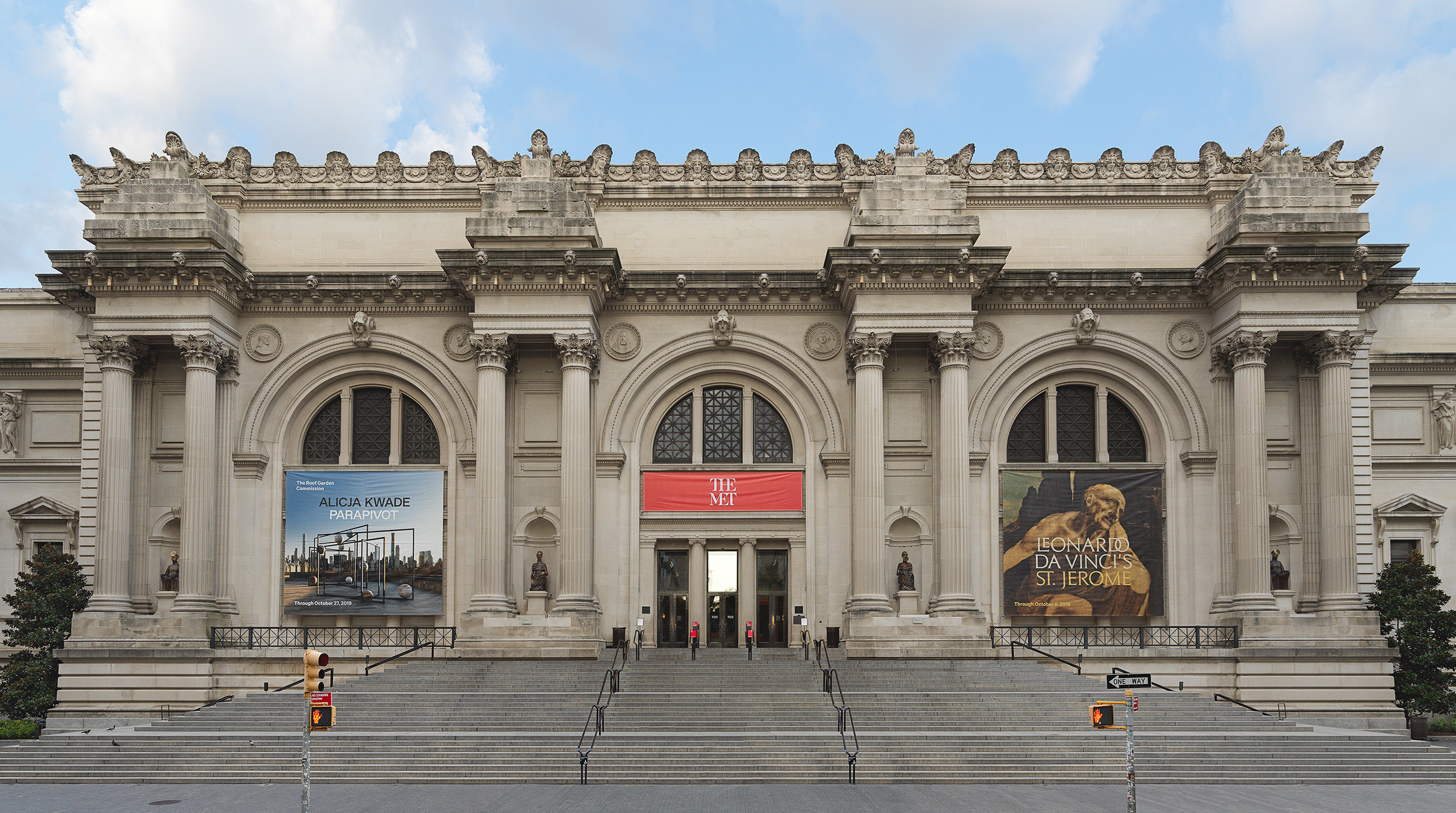
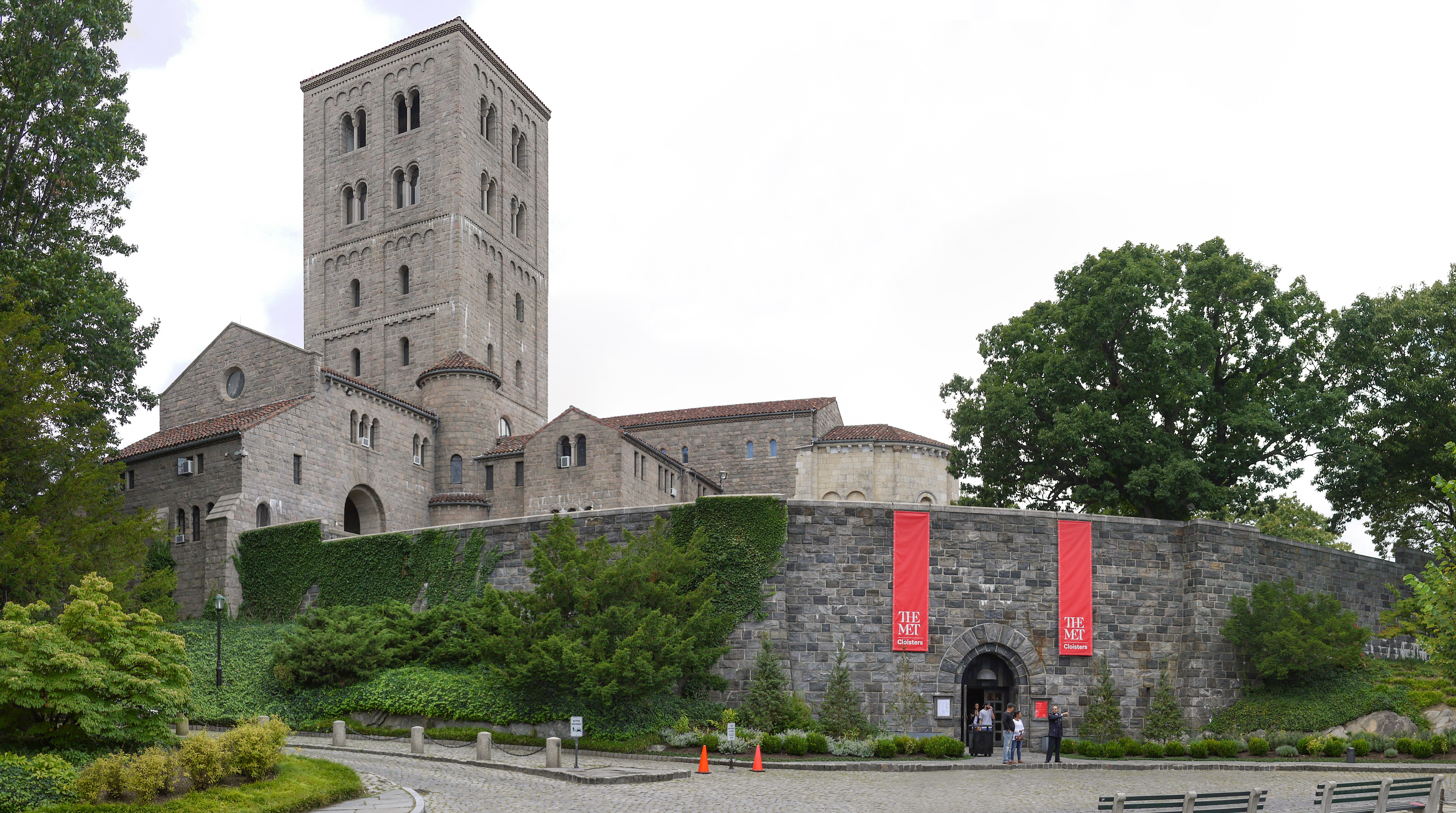
- Entrance façades to The Met Fifth Avenue and The Cloisters
- Established: April 13, 1870; 156 years ago
- Location: 1000 Fifth Avenue (The Met Fifth Avenue); 99 Margaret Corbin Drive (The Cloisters); New York City, U.S.
- Coordinates: 40.7794°N 73.9631°W
- Collection size: 2 million
- Visitors: 5,727,258 (2024)
- Chairs: Candace Beinecke; Hamilton E. James
- Director: Max Hollein
- Public transit access: The Met Fifth Avenue –: New York City Bus: M1, M2, M3, M4, M79, M86; New York City Subway: trains at 86th Street
- Website: metmuseum.org

The Metropolitan Museum of Art, colloquially referred to as the Met, (Note: In addition to, among other institutions, the Metropolitan Opera, also in New York.) is an encyclopedic art museum in New York City. By floor area, it is the fourth-largest museum in the world and the largest art museum in the Americas. With 5,727,258 visitors in fiscal year 2025, it was the most-visited museum in the United States and the fifth-most visited art museum in the world.

In 2000, its permanent collection had over two million works; it currently lists a total of 1.5 million works. The collection is divided into 17 curatorial departments. The main building at 1000 Fifth Avenue, along the Museum Mile on the eastern edge of Central Park on Manhattan's Upper East Side, is by area one of the world's largest art museums. The first portion of the approximately 2-million-square-foot (190,000 m^{2}) building was built in 1880. A much smaller second location, The Cloisters at Fort Tryon Park in Upper Manhattan, contains an extensive collection of art, architecture, and artifacts from medieval Europe. A third site, currently the Neue Galerie New York, is set to become the museum's newest location in 2028 when the museum merges with and absorbs the smaller Neue Galerie and its collection of early 20th century Austrian and German art.

The Metropolitan Museum of Art was founded in 1870. The museum was established by a group of Americans, including philanthropists, artists, and businessmen, with the goal of creating a national institution that would inspire and educate the public. The museum's permanent collection consists of works of art ranging from the ancient Near East and ancient Egypt, through classical antiquity to the contemporary world. It includes paintings, sculptures, and graphic works from many European Old Masters, as well as an extensive collection of American, modern, and contemporary art. The Met also maintains extensive holdings of African, Asian, Oceanian, Byzantine, and Islamic art. The museum is home to encyclopedic collections of musical instruments, costumes, and decorative arts and textiles, as well as antique weapons and armor from around the world. Several notable interiors, ranging from 1st-century Rome through modern American design, are installed in its galleries.

== Collections ==
The Met's permanent collection is curated by seventeen separate departments, each with a specialized staff of curators and scholars, as well as six dedicated conservation departments and a Department of Scientific Research. The permanent collection includes works of art from classical antiquity and ancient Egypt; paintings and sculptures from nearly all the European masters; and an extensive collection of American and modern art. The Met maintains extensive holdings of African, Asian, Oceanian, Byzantine, and Islamic art. The museum is also home to encyclopedic collections of musical instruments, costumes and accessories, and antique weapons and armor from around the world. A great number of period rooms, ranging from first-century Rome through modern American design, are permanently installed in the Met's galleries. Since the late 1800s, the Museum has been collecting diverse materials from all over the world. Its outreach to "exhibition designers, architects, graphic designers, lighting designers, and production designers" helps the museum to maintain its collection in good condition.

=== Geographically designated collections ===
==== Ancient Near Eastern art ====
Beginning in the late 19th century, the Met started acquiring ancient art and artifacts from the Near East. From a few cuneiform tablets and seals, the museum's collection of Near Eastern art has grown to more than 7,000 pieces. Representing a history of the region beginning in the Neolithic Period and encompassing the fall of the Sasanian Empire and the end of Late Antiquity, the collection includes works from the Sumerian, Hittite, Sasanian, Assyrian, Babylonian, and Elamite cultures (among others), as well as an extensive collection of unique Bronze Age objects. The highlights of the collection include the Sumerian Stele of Ushumgal, the Elamite silver Kneeling Bull with Vessel, the Pratt Ivories, and a set of monumental stone lamassu, or guardian figures, from the Northwest Palace of the Assyrian king Ashurnasirpal II.

==== Arts of Africa, Oceania, and the Americas ====
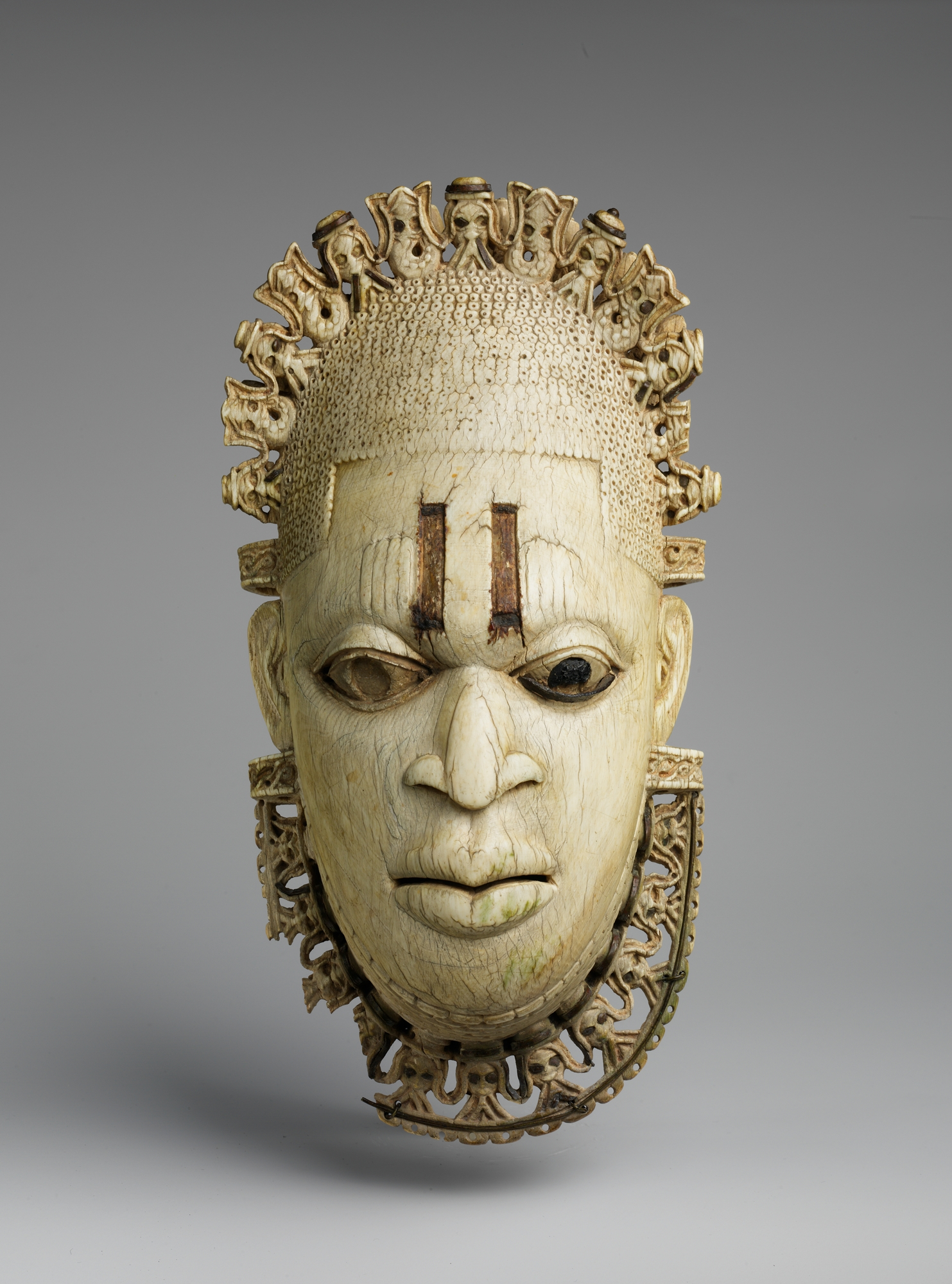
Benin ivory mask, Iyoba, 16th-century Nigeria

Though the Met first acquired a group of Peruvian antiquities in 1882, in addition to Mesoamerican antiquities, the museum did not begin a concerted effort to collect works from Africa, Oceania, and the Americas until 1969, when American businessman, philanthropist and then NY Gov. Nelson A. Rockefeller donated his more than 3,000-piece collection to the museum. Before Rockefeller's collection was gifted to the Met, Rockefeller founded The Museum of Primitive Art in New York City with the intention of displaying these works, after the Met had previously shown little interest in his art collection. In 1968, the Met had agreed to a temporary exhibition of Rockefeller's work. However, the Met then requested to include the arts of Africa, Oceania, and the Americas in their permanent collection. The arts of Africa, Oceania, and the Americas opened to the public in 1982, under the title, "The Michael C. Rockefeller Wing". This wing is named after Nelson Rockefeller's son, Michael Rockefeller, who died while collecting works in New Guinea. The collection shows the cultural and artistic traditions of communities from across these regions.

Today, the Met's collection contains more than 11,000 pieces from sub-Saharan Africa, the Pacific Islands, and the Americas and is housed in the 40,000-square-foot (4,000 m^{2}) Rockefeller Wing on the south end of the museum. The Wing exhibits Non-Western works of art created from 3,000 BCE – present, including a wide range of particular cultural traditions. Significantly, this work was regarded as art, judged on aesthetic terms, in a Western art museum. Before then, objects from Africa, Oceania, and the Americas were often considered to be the work of "primitives" or ethnographic work, rather than art.

The Wing exhibits the arts of Africa, Oceania, and the Americas in an exhibition separated by geographical locations. The collection ranges from 40,000-year-old indigenous Australian rock paintings, to a group of 15-foot-tall (4.6 m) memorial poles carved by the Asmat people of New Guinea, to a priceless collection of ceremonial and personal objects from the Nigerian Court of Benin donated by Klaus Perls.

Curator of African Art Susan Mullin Vogel discussed a famous Benin artifact acquired by the Metropolitan Museum of Art in 1972. It was originally auctioned in April 1900 by a lieutenant named Augustus Pitt Rivers at the price of 37 guineas.

In December 2021, the Met began its $70 million (~$81.9 million in 2025) renovation of The Michael C. Rockefeller Wing's African, ancient American, and Oceanic art galleries, originally planned to begin in 2020 but now set for completion in 2024. The 40,000 square-feet renovation includes the reinstallation of an exterior glass curtain, which had deteriorated, as well as the galleries in their entirety, which house 3,000 works.

==== Asian art ====
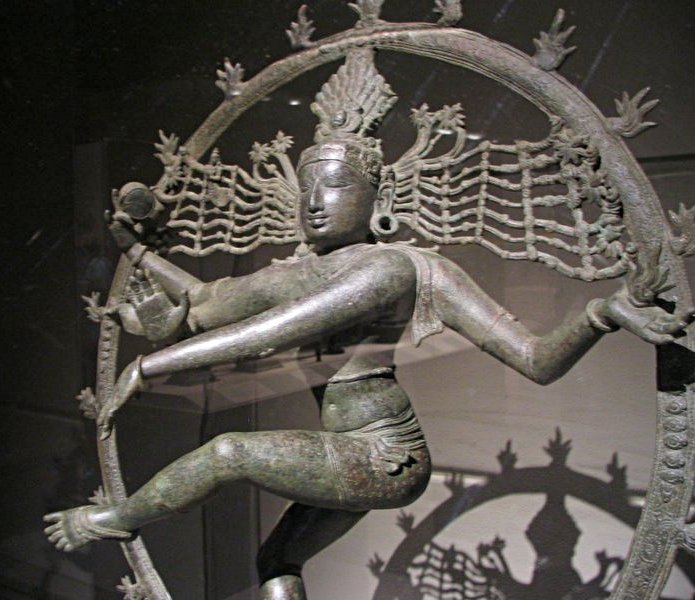
Bronze Chola Statue of Nataraja, 11th century, Tamilnadu

The Met's Asian department holds a collection of Asian art of more than 35,000 pieces, which the museum refers to as "one of the largest and most comprehensive in the world." The collection dates back almost to the founding of the museum: many of the philanthropists who made the earliest gifts to the museum had Asian art in their collections. Notable early donors include J. Pierpont Morgan, Benjamin Altman, and the Havemeyer and Rockefeller families. The museum created the Department of Far Eastern Art (which did not include India) in 1915, though the "real impetus for creating a comprehensive collection of Asian art came from Douglas Dillon," who became board chair in 1970 and made Asian a museum priority. At the time, it was deemed "the weakest curatorial department in terms of staff, galleries, and collection," and the museum only devoted one gallery and cases in the balcony above the Great Hall to Asian art. Dillon partnered with Wen C. Fong, a Princeton art professor, hired in 1971 to develop the Asian collection. Fong advocated collecting entire collections. Today, an entire wing of 64,500 square feet is dedicated to what is now called The Department of Asian Art, which spans 5,000 years.

Major Asian civilizations are well-represented in the Met's Asian department. The pieces on display represent diverse types of decorative art, from painting and printmaking to sculpture and metalworking. The department is well known for its comprehensive collection of Cambodian, Indian, Chinese art (including calligraphy and painting), Japanese, and Korean art, as well as for its Thai, Nepalese,ese and Tibetan works. Burma (Myanmar) is also represented. Three ancient religions of India—Hinduism, Buddhism and Jainism—are represented by sculpture and other media. However, not only "art" and ritual objects are represented in the collection; many of the best-known pieces are functional objects. Maxwell K. Hearn has been the department chair of Asian Art since 2011.

==== Arts of China ====
According to curator Hearn, the Met has "more space devoted to Chinese art than any other museum outside of China." The Chinese collection, which began in 1879 with the purchase of about 1,000 ceramics, now has more than 14,000 works in all mediums, 80-90 percent of which came as gifts. Herber R. Bishop donated 1,000 jade objects in 1902, initially installed in a Louis XV style ballroom. Benjamin Altman left 429 Chinese porcelains to the Met on his death in 1913. Gifts of diverse material came from the collections of J. Pierpont Morgan and the Havemeyer and Rockefeller families.

In 1973 the Met acquired 25 important Song and Yuan dynasty paintings, dating from the 11th–14th century, from C. C. Wang, followed by other purchases. John M. Crawford Jr. promised over 200 paintings and calligraphies to the Met in 1981. According to the museum, its "Chinese painting and calligraphy now ranks as one of the most comprehensive and important outside of Asia and one of the most outstanding collections in the world."

The Astor Court, a complete Ming Dynasty-style garden court opened in 1981, is the first outside of China. It is modeled on a courtyard in the Master of the Nets Garden in Suzhou. At his death in 1983, Ernest Erickson left the Met 150 Chinese antiquities, including very important ritual bronzes and jades. In 1988, John C. and Charlotte Weber donated a collection rich in ritual bronzes, textiles, and ceramics, as well as funds to endow the Chinese galleries. Adele and Stanley Herzman gifted a very important collection of ceramics in the 1980s and 90s. Florence and Herbert Irving gave 1,200 Asian works to the museum in 2015, which included 500 Chinese objects, mostly decorative arts, such as lacquer and jade. They also endowed decorative arts galleries that hold Chinese works.

==== Arts of Japan ====
The Japanese collection began courtesy of omnivorous collectors (the major early one was the Havemeyers), casual curio-collectors, and designers who used Japanese art as source material. The dealer Yamanaka & Co brought many masterworks to the U.S. that ultimately came to the Met The museum's first Asian curator, Sigisbert Chrétien Bosch Reitz (1915 to 1927) bought major Buddhist statues and screens, and his successor, Alan Priest (1898–1969) also acquired some major pieces. The gift and purchase for $5.1 million in 1975 of Harry G. C. Packard's (1914–1991) collection of over 400 diverse works made the museum comprehensive in the Arts of Japan, with dedicated galleries opening in 1987. The other collection-defining gift was that of Mary Griggs Burke in 2015, with over 300 works, whose strength is in screen paintings and sculptures. Major print collections were sold to the museum by Frank Lloyd Wright between 1918 and 1922, and gifted by the Havemeyers and William S. Lieberman, the former chair of Twentieth-Century Art. The most recent large gift is that of over 250 works from Mary and Cheney Cowles.

==== Arts of South and Southeast Asia ====
Notwithstanding miscellaneous gifts and purchases, the impetus for serious collecting in this area stemmed from the museum's rededication to encyclopedic collecting in 1970. "When curator Martin Lerner arrived at the Met, in 1972, he had concluded that no more than sixty objects in the Met’s collection [of South and Southeast Asian art] were worthy of exhibition.' In 1982 the department exhibited 41 recent acquisitions. Then-director Philippe de Montebello said the acquisition of 14 major sculptures from the Pan Asian collection enabled the museum to "happily join the most distinguished collections of the art of Southeast Asia and the subcontinent."

Samuel Eilenberg's gift in 1987 of over 400 works (in concert with the purchase of works he had donated to Columbia University) provided early Indian/Pakistani, Indonesian, and Thai works that considerably elevated the collection's importance. Eilenberg also left an important bequest of additional artworks to the museum. The Kronos Collections, formed by former Met curator Steven Kossak, provided diverse sculptures and a large and growing collection of Indian paintings. It was first exhibited at the Met in 1984, and documented in the catalogue The Flame and the Lotus. Divine Pleasures: a volume of Kronos collection paintings, was published in 2016.

In addition to numerous gifts, the most important of which were sculptures, the Irvings also endowed the South and Southeast Asian galleries. Opened in 1994, these 18 galleries, with 13,500 square feet, "constitute the largest such display outside Asia."

==== Arts of Korea ====
The first Korean objects came to the museum in 1889 with the gift of the Crosby Brown Collection of musical instruments. The Met had only 65 Korean works in 1915, some of which were misidentified as Chinese or Japanese. Mary Griggs Burke and Florence and Herbert Irving made important gifs of Korean art. The Arts of Korea gallery opened in 1998, with support from the Korea Foundation (a government entity) as well as the Samsung Foundation of Culture. Contemporary Korean art is also shown in the Korea gallery, as well as other departments. The exhibition Lineages: Korean Art at The Met celebrated the 25th anniversary of the Korean galleries.

==== Egyptian art ====
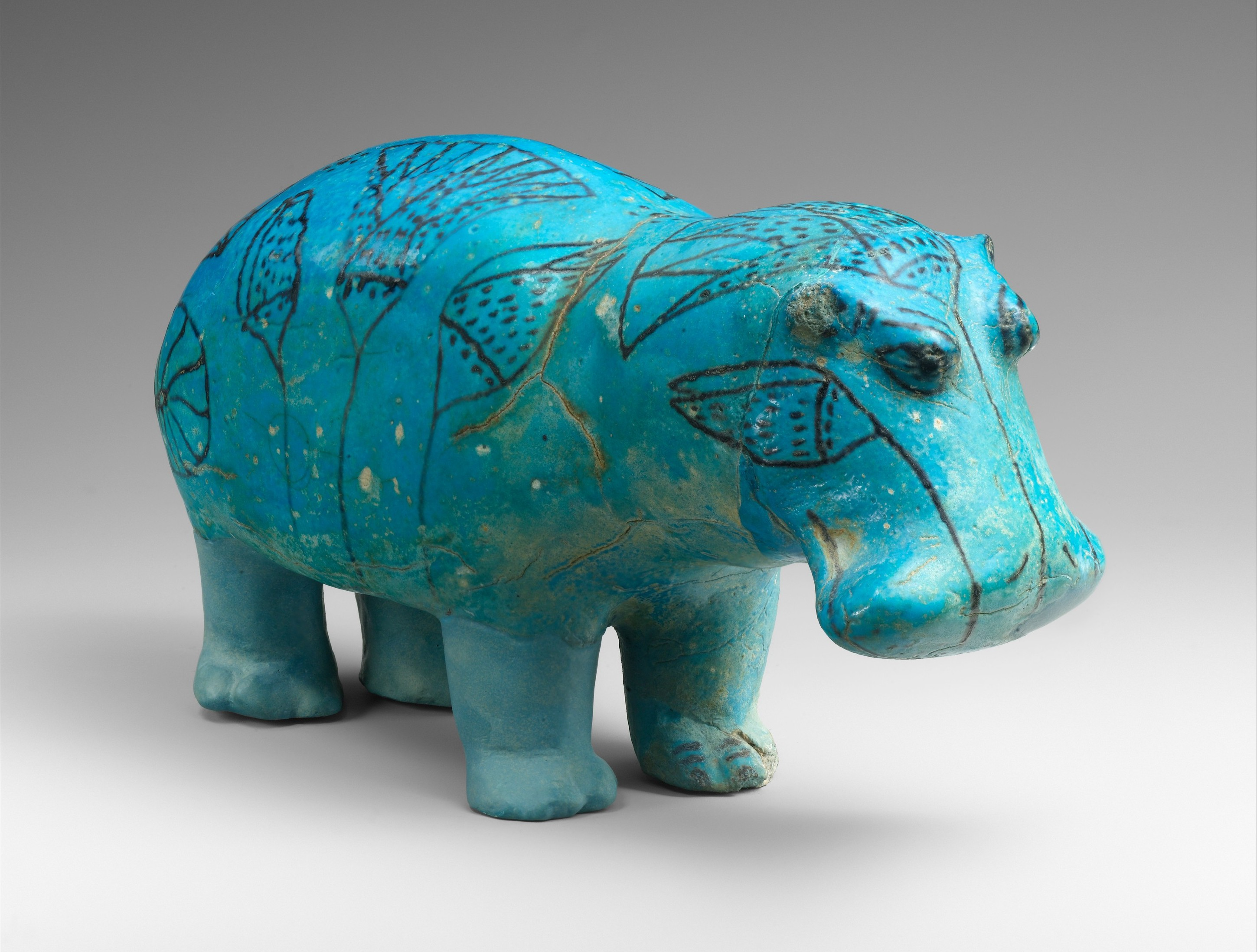
William the Hippopotamus is a mascot of the Met.

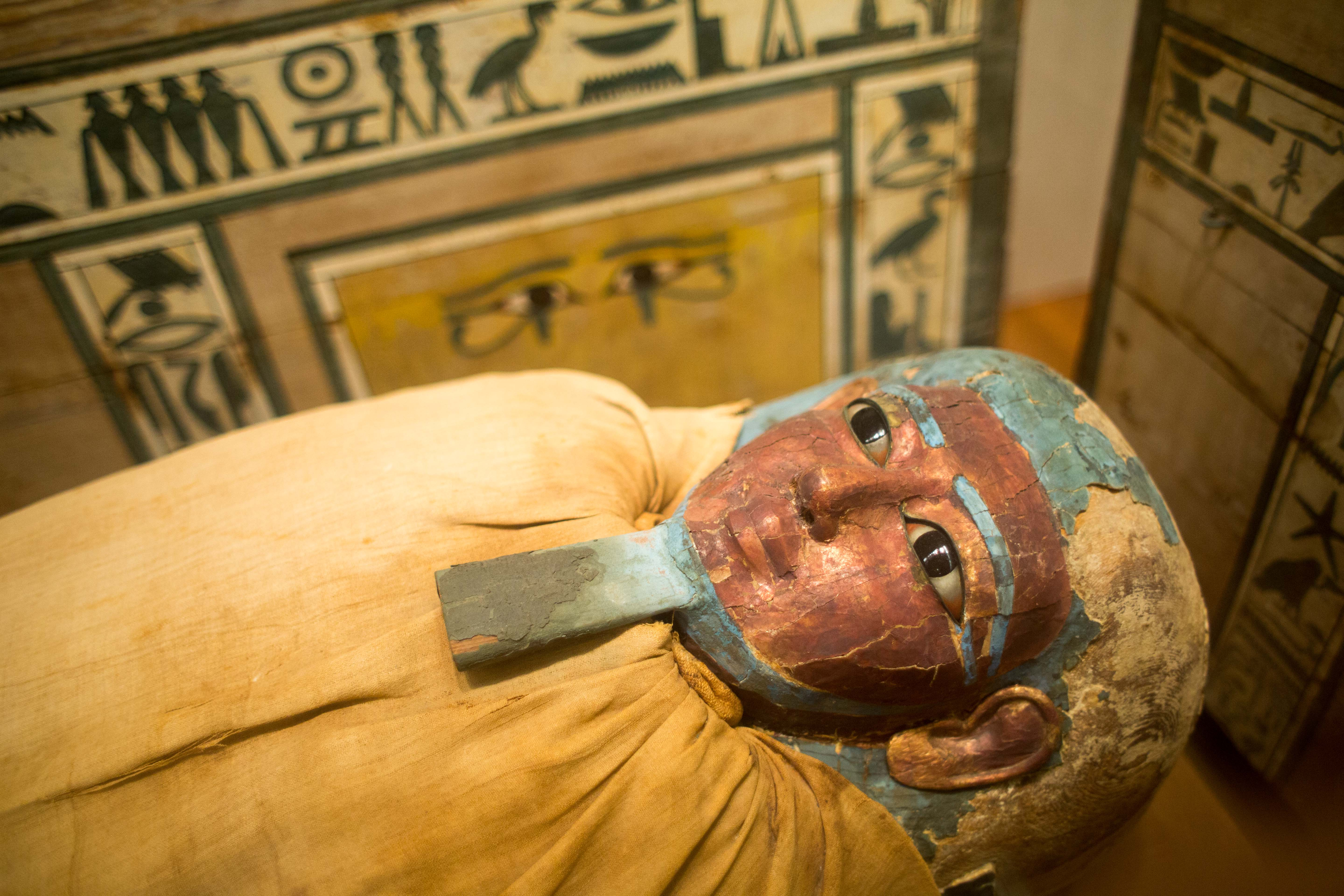
Mummy, Metropolitan Museum of Art

Though the majority of the Met's initial holdings of Egyptian art came from private collections, items uncovered during the museum's own archeological excavations, carried out between 1906 and 1941, constitute almost half of the current collection. More than 26,000 separate pieces of Egyptian art from the Paleolithic era through the Ptolemaic era constitute the Met's Egyptian collection, and almost all of them are on display in the museum's massive wing of 40 Egyptian galleries. Among the rarest pieces in the Met's Egyptian collection are 13 wooden models (of the total 24 models found together, 12 models and 1 offering bearer figure is at the Met, while the remaining 10 models and 1 offering bearer figure are in the Egyptian Museum in Cairo), discovered in a tomb in the Southern Asasif in western Thebes in 1920. These models depict, in unparalleled detail, a cross-section of Egyptian life in the early Middle Kingdom: boats, gardens, and scenes of daily life are represented in miniature. William the Faience Hippopotamus is a miniature that has become the informal mascot of the museum. Other notable items in the Egyptian collection include the Chair of Reniseneb, the Lotiform Chalice, and the Metternich Stela.

However, the popular centerpiece of the Egyptian Art department continues to be the Temple of Dendur. Dismantled by the Egyptian government as part of the International Campaign to Save the Monuments of Nubia to save it from rising waters caused by the building of the Aswan High Dam, the large sandstone temple was given to the United States in 1965 and assembled in a new wing at the Met in 1978. Situated in a large room and partially surrounded by a reflecting pool and illuminated by a wall of windows opening onto Central Park, the Temple of Dendur has been one of the Met's most enduring attractions. Among the oldest items at the Met, a set of Archeulian flints from Deir el-Bahri which date from the Lower Paleolithic period (between 300,000 and 75,000 BCE), are part of the Egyptian collection. The first curator was Albert Lythgoe, who directed several Egyptian excavations for the museum. Since 2013 the curator has been Diana Craig Patch.

In 2018, the museum built an exhibition around the golden-sheathed 1st-century BCE coffin of Nedjemankh, a high-ranking priest of the ram-headed god Heryshaf of Heracleopolis. Investigators determined that the artifact had been stolen in 2011 from Egypt, and the museum returned it.

=== European paintings ===
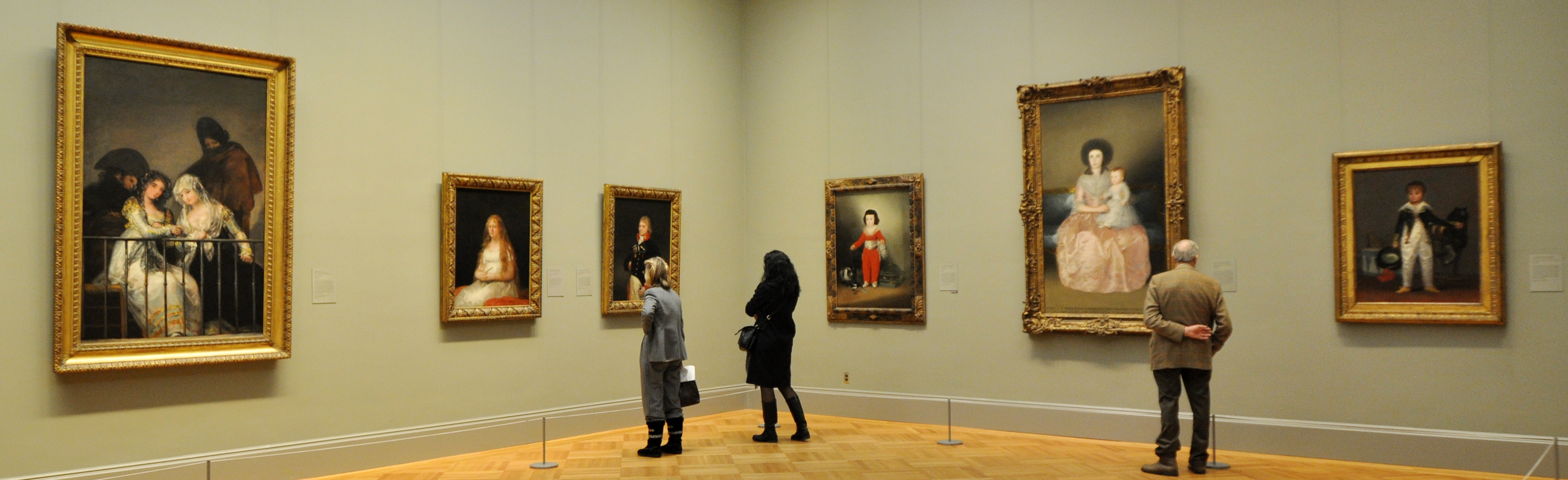
European paintings at the museum

In 2012 the Met's collection of European paintings numbered "more than 2,500 works of art from the thirteenth through the early twentieth century." As of December 2021, it had 2,625. These paintings are housed in the Old Masters galleries (newly installed in 2023), the Nineteenth and Early Twentieth Century galleries reinstalled in 2007 (both on the second floor of the main building), the Robert Lehman Collection, and the Jack and Belle Linsky Collection (both on the first floor); a number of paintings also hang in other departmental galleries. Some of the medieval paintings are permanently exhibited at the Met Cloisters. The current curator in charge of the European Paintings department is Stephan Wolohojian.

==== Old Master paintings ====
The collection began when 174 paintings were purchased from European dealers in 1871. Almost two-thirds of these paintings have been deaccessioned, but quality paintings by Jordaens, Van Dyck, Poussin, the Tiepolos, Guardi, and some other artists remain in the collection. Major gifts from Henry Gurdon Marquand in 1889, 1890 and 1891 gave the Met a much more solid foundation. Additionally, his example helped to create a taste for collecting Old Master paintings. In 1913, the Benjamin Altman bequest had sufficient range and depth to put the Met's collection of paintings on the map. In 1949, the Jules Bache gift added more great paintings. The Robert Lehman Collection, which came to the museum in 1975, included many significant paintings, and is particularly strong in early Renaissance material. Over a period of decades, Charles and Jayne Wrightsman donated 94 works of unusually high quality to the Department of European Paintings, the last of which came with Mrs. Wrightsman's bequest in 2019. Notwithstanding the contributions made by Marquand, Altman, Bache, and Lehman, it has been written that "the Wrightsman paintings are highest in overall quality and condition." The latter "collected expertise as well as art," and advanced technology made better choices possible. Additionally, the Wrightsmans had the Met's curators at their disposal, for whom they served as a virtual "auxiliary purchase fund for objects the Met curators coveted, but could not afford."

==== Plein air, Impressionist, and Post-Impressionist painting ====
The Met's plein air painting collection, which it calls "unrivaled", was the last large section of the European Paintings collection to have a home at the museum. The sale of a Monet and the construction of small scale galleries ultimately resulted in the acquisition of 220 European paintings (most of them plein-air sketches) from two collections. The Monet was used to purchase a half share of Wheelock "Lock" Whitney III's collection in 2003 (the remainder came as a promised gift), and when Eugene V. Thaw (1927–2018) saw how good they looked in the Met's new, purpose built galleries, he and his wife Clare donated their substantially larger collection to the Met (much of it a joint gift to the Morgan Library). The Met easily has the best collection of this material in the nation, and one of the three or four best in the world. Thus the Met's collection, hitherto top-heavy with famous French artists, "became uniquely diverse," with "many little-known artists from France, as well as numerous artists from other European nations;" many of which are not otherwise represented in U.S. museums. The plein-air collection forms a bridge "to what became the avant-garde," the Impressionists and their successors.

As noted by the museum, "a work by Renoir entered the Museum as early as 1907 (today the Museum has become one of the world's great repositories of Impressionist and Post-Impressionist art)." The museum terms its nineteenth-century French paintings "second only to the museums of Paris," with strengths in "Gustave Courbet, Edgar Degas, Édouard Manet, Claude Monet, Paul Cézanne, Vincent van Gogh, and others."

The foundation of the museum's Impressionist and Post-Impressionist collection was laid by the Louisine (1855–1929) and Henry Osborne Havemeyer (1847–1907) collection. The most important portion of their collection came to the museum after the death of Louisine in 1929. It was strong in works by Courbet, Corot, Manet, Monet, and, above all, Degas. The other gift of this material came from Walter H. and Leonore Annenberg, who, before they promised their collection to the Met in 1991, annually loaned it to the Met for half a year at a time. Walter Annenberg described his choice of gifting his collection to the Met as an example of "strength going to strength." The two collections are complementary: "The Annenberg collection serves as a second, complementary core collection of blue chip Impressionist and Post-Impressionist paintings. Most importantly, it strengthened the Met's relatively sparse holdings of Gauguin and Toulouse-Lautrec, it added needed late works by Cézanne and Monet as well as a rare Seurat, and it brought a very impressive group of Van Goghs to a collection already rich in works by the Dutchman."

==== European sculpture and decorative arts ====
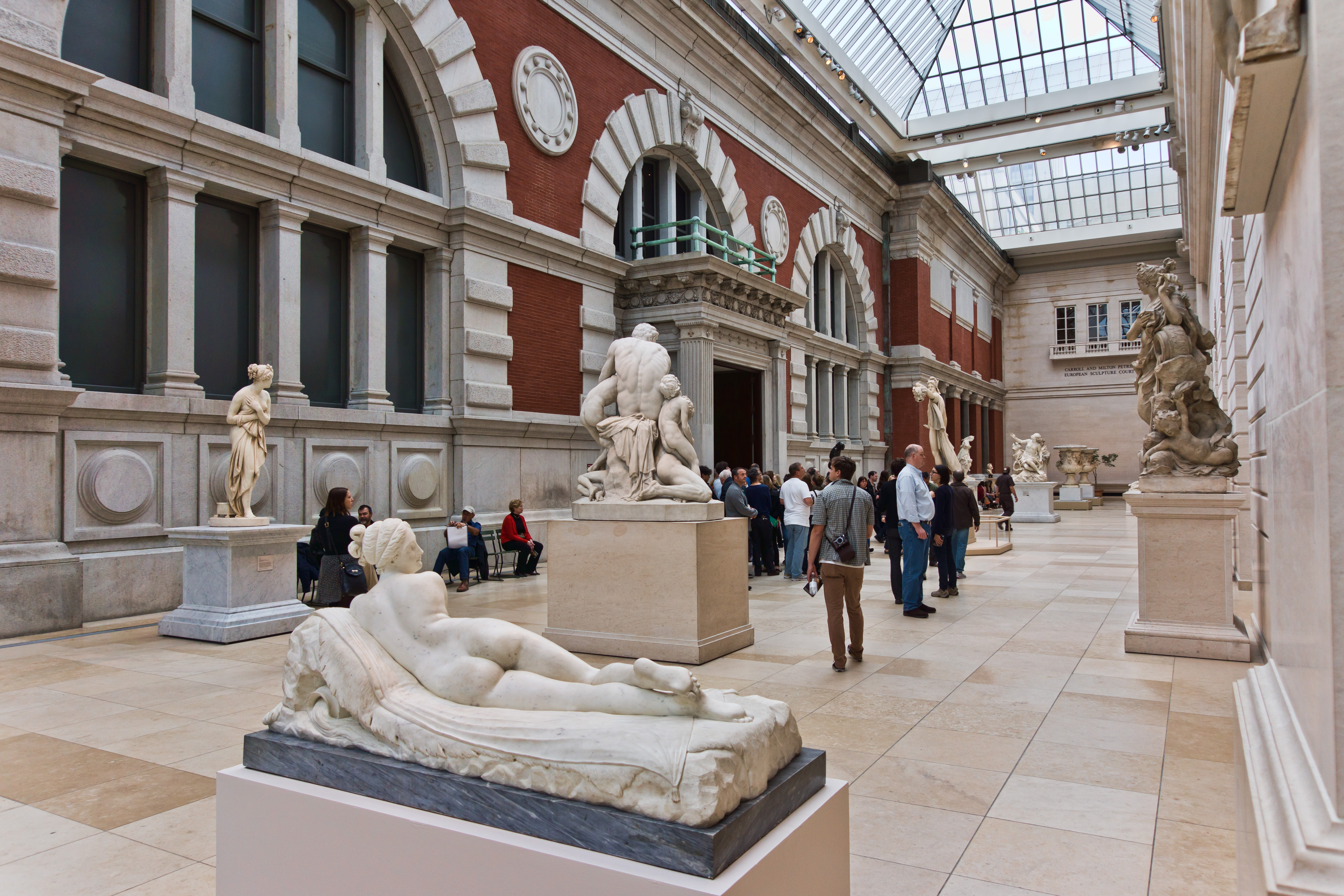
European sculpture court

The European Sculpture and Decorative Arts collection is one of the largest departments at the Met, holding in excess of 50,000 separate pieces from the 15th through the early 20th centuries. Although the collection is particularly concentrated in Renaissance sculpture—much of which can be seen in situ surrounded by contemporary furnishings and decoration—it also contains comprehensive holdings of furniture, jewelry, glass and ceramic pieces, tapestries, textiles, and timepieces and mathematical instruments. In addition to its outstanding collections of English and French furniture, visitors can enter dozens of completely furnished period rooms, transplanted in their entirety into the Met's galleries. The collection even includes an entire 16th-century patio from the Spanish castle of Vélez Blanco, reconstructed in a two-story gallery, and the intarsia studiolo from the ducal palace at Gubbio. Sculptural highlights of the sprawling department include Bernini's Bacchanal, a cast of Rodin's The Burghers of Calais, and several unique pieces by Houdon, including his Bust of Voltaire and his famous portrait of his daughter Sabine.

==== American Wing ====
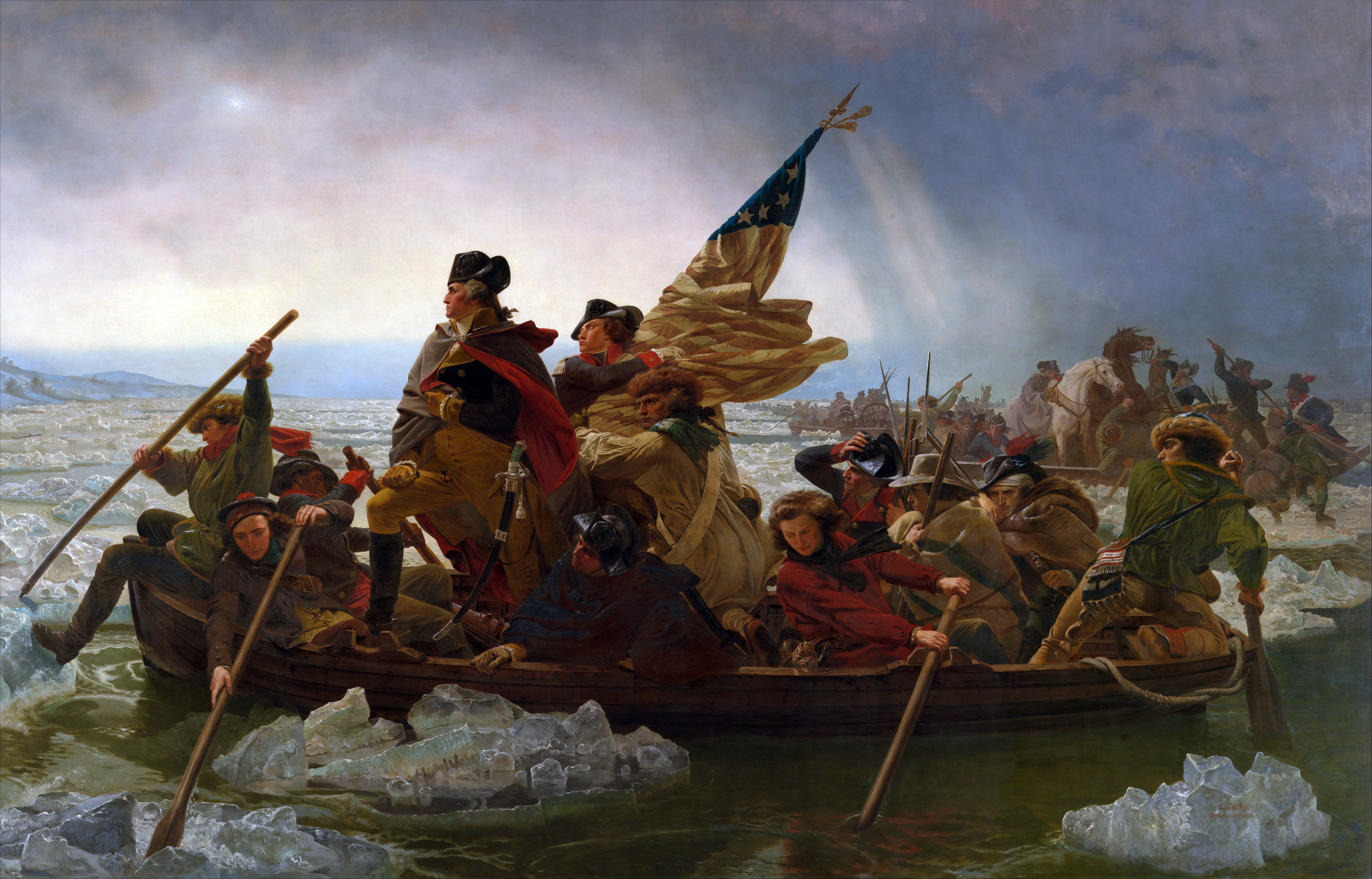
Washington Crossing the Delaware by Emanuel Leutze

The museum's collection of American art returned to view in new galleries on January 16, 2012. The new installation provides visitors with the history of American art from the 18th through the early 20th century. The new galleries encompasses 30,000 square feet (2,800 m^{2}) for the display of the museum's collection. The curator in charge of the American Wing since September 2014 is Sylvia Yount.

In July 2018, Art of Native America opened in the American Wing. This marked the first appearance of Indigenous American art in the museum's vast American wing. Art of Native America was accompanied by a statement from the institution. "The American Wing acknowledges the sovereign Native American and Indigenous communities dispossessed from the lands and waters of this region. We affirm our intentions for ongoing relationships with contemporary Native American and Indigenous artists and the original communities whose ancestral and aesthetic items we care for." Contrary to this public statement, the museum came under immense scrutiny for the hazy provenance of the displayed items. This was followed by the hiring of a new curator of Indigenous American art for the museum, Dr. Patricia Marroquin Norby, who is of Purépecha descent.

==== Greek and Roman art ====
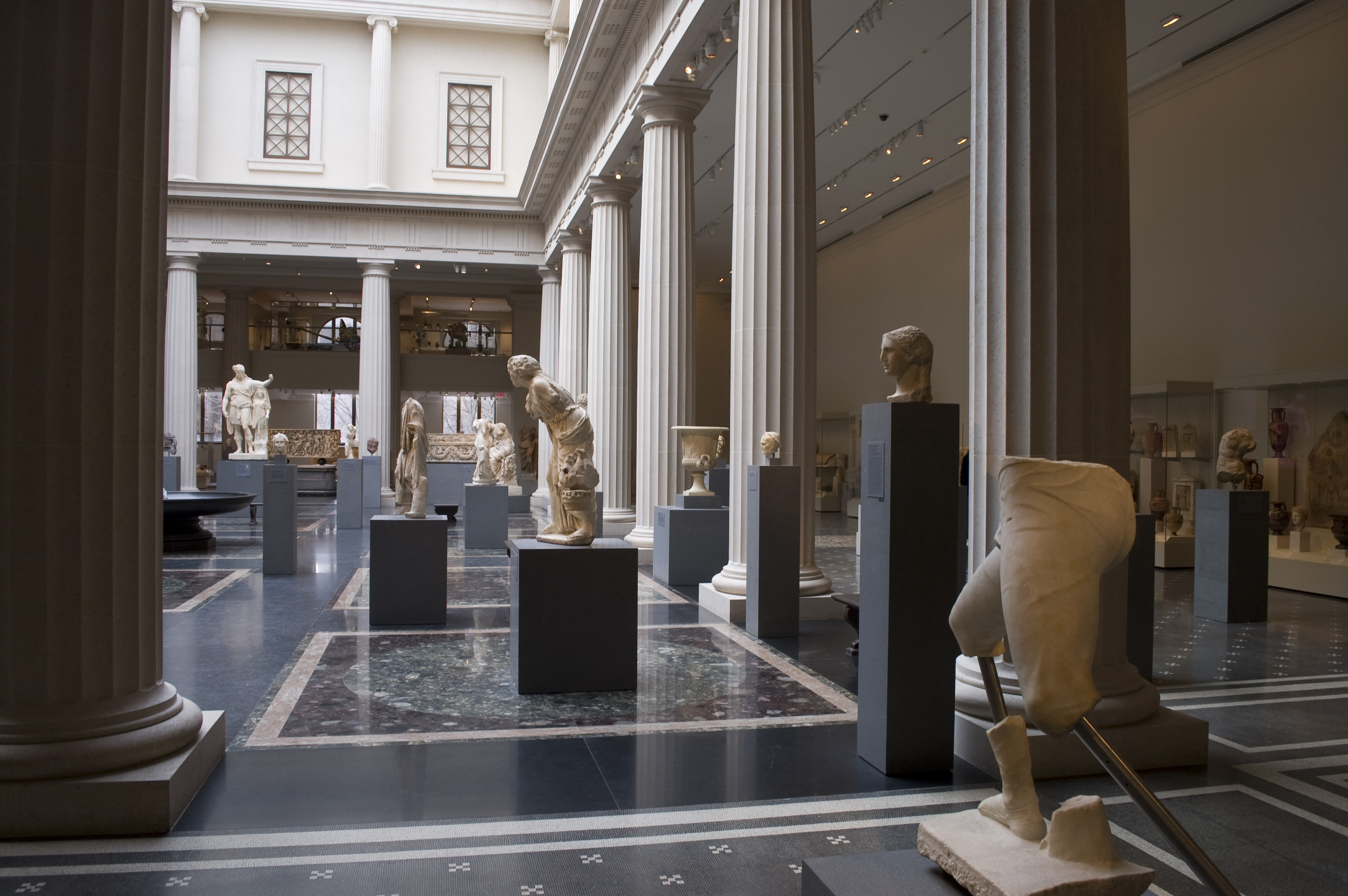
Greek and Roman gallery

The Met's collection of Greek and Roman art contains more than 17,000 objects. The Greek and Roman collection dates back to the founding of the museum—in fact, the museum's first accessioned object was a Roman sarcophagus, still currently on display. Though the collection naturally concentrates on items from ancient Greece and the Roman Empire, these historical regions represent a wide range of cultures and artistic styles, from classic Greek black-figure and red-figure vases to carved Roman tunic pins.

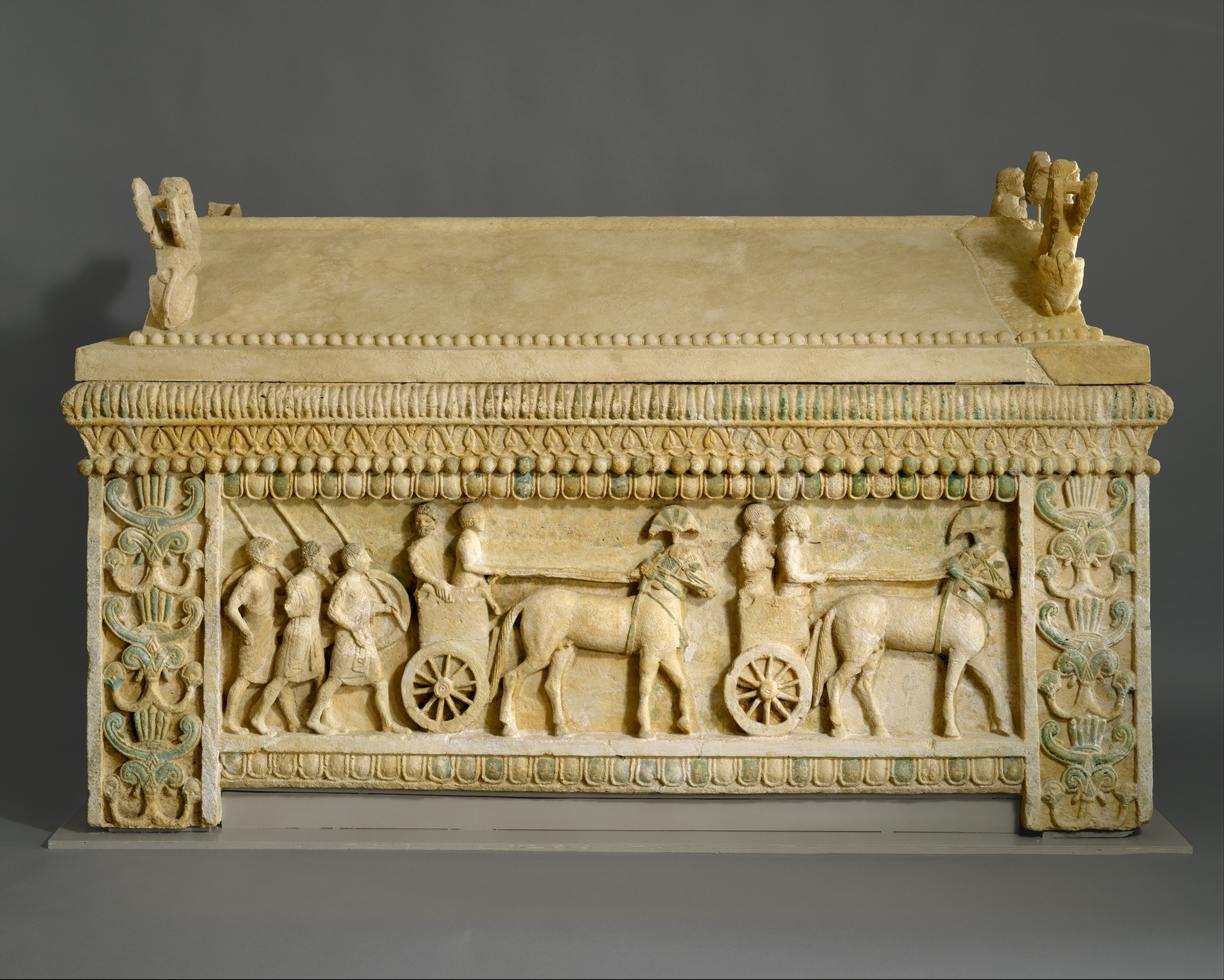
The Amathus sarcophagus, from Amathus, Cyprus, arguably the single most important object in the Cesnola Collection

Highlights of the collection include the monumental Amathus sarcophagus and a magnificently detailed Etruscan chariot known as the "Monteleone chariot". The collection also contains many pieces from far earlier than the Greek or Roman empires—among the most remarkable are a collection of early Cycladic sculptures from the mid-third millennium BCE, many so abstract as to seem almost modern. The Greek and Roman galleries also contain several large classical wall paintings and reliefs from different periods, including an entire reconstructed bedroom from a noble villa in Boscoreale, excavated after its entombment by the eruption of Vesuvius in 79 CE. In 2007, the Met's Greek and Roman galleries were expanded to approximately 60,000 square feet (6,000 m^{2}), allowing the majority of the collection to be on permanent display.

==== Islamic art ====
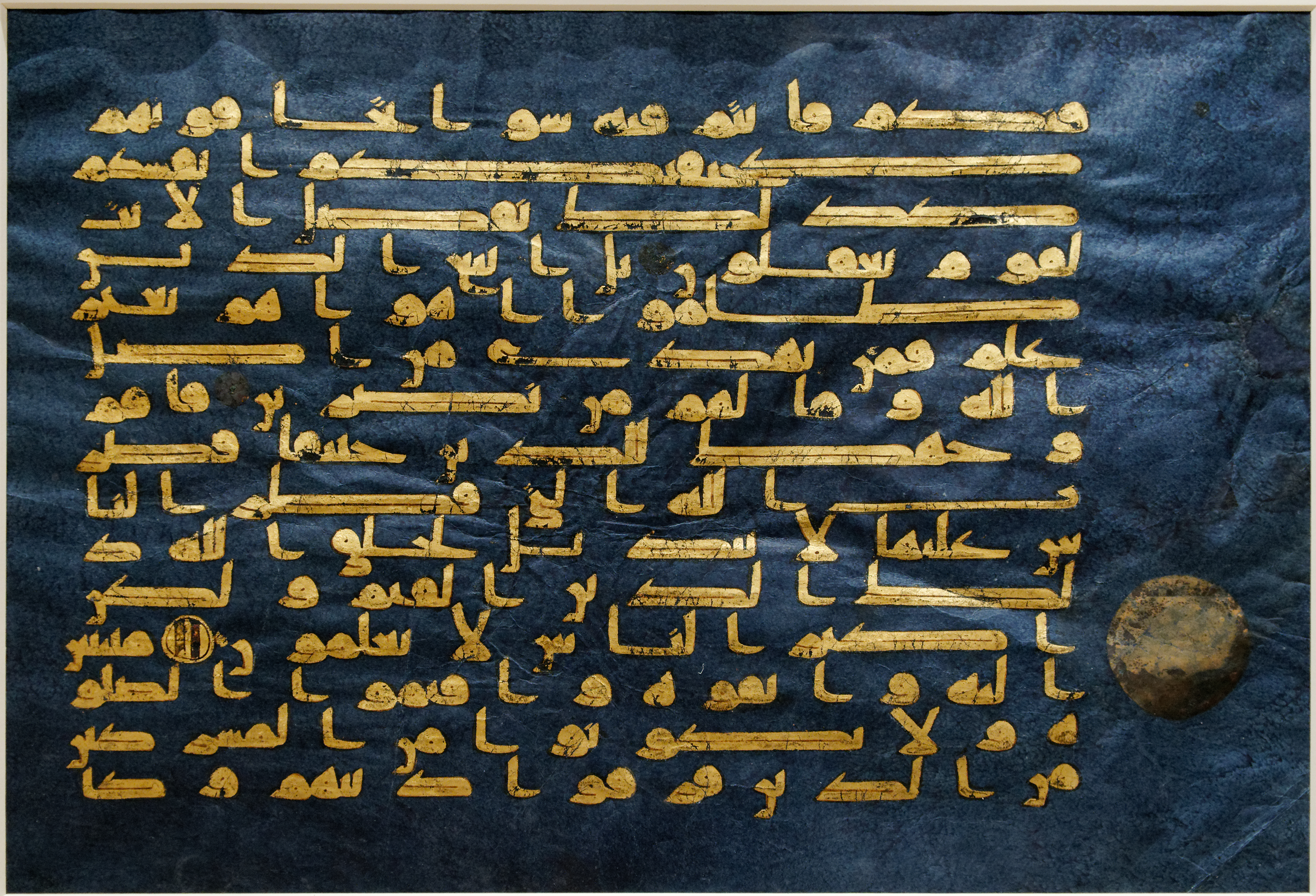
Leaf from the Blue Qur'an showing Chapter 30: 28–32

The Metropolitan Museum owns one of the world's largest collection of works of art of the Islamic world. The collection also includes artifacts and works of art of cultural and secular origin from the time period indicated by the rise of Islam predominantly from the Near East and in contrast to the Ancient Near Eastern collections. The biggest number of miniatures from the "Shahnameh" list prepared under the reign of Shah Tahmasp I, the most luxurious of all the existing Islamic manuscripts, also belongs to this museum. Other rarities include the works of Sultan Muhammad and his associates from the Tabriz school "The Sade Holiday", "Tahmiras kills divs", "Bijan and Manijeh", and many others.

The Met's collection of Islamic art is not confined strictly to religious art, though a significant number of the objects in the Islamic collection were originally created for religious use or as decorative elements in mosques. Much of the 12,000 strong collection consists of secular items, including ceramics and textiles, from Islamic cultures ranging from Spain to North Africa to Central Asia. The Islamic Art department's collection of miniature paintings from Iran and Mughal India are a highlight of the collection. Calligraphy both religious and secular is well represented in the Islamic Art department, from the official decrees of Suleiman the Magnificent to a number of Quran manuscripts reflecting different periods and styles of calligraphy. Modern calligraphic artists also used a word or phrase to convey a direct message, or they created compositions from the shapes of Arabic words. Others incorporated indecipherable cursive writing within the body of the work to evoke the illusion of writing.

Islamic Arts galleries had been undergoing refurbishment since 2001 and reopened on November 1, 2011, as the New Galleries for the Art of the Arab Lands, Turkey, Iran, Central Asia, and Later South Asia. Until that time, a narrow selection of items from the collection had been on temporary display throughout the museum. As with many other departments at the Met, the Islamic Art galleries contain many interior pieces, including the entire reconstructed Nur Al-Din Room from an early 18th-century house in Damascus.

In September 2022 the Met revealed that it had received a substantial gift from Qatar Museums on the occasion of its 10th anniversary of the opening of its Galleries for the Art of the Arab Lands, Turkey, Iran, Central Asia and Later South Asia, which would benefit its Department of Islamic Art and some of the museum's other principal projects. As a token of its appreciation the name Qatar Gallery was adopted for the museum's Gallery of the Umayyad and Abbasid Periods. This followed the announcement that the Met and Qatar Museums had entered into a partnership to foster their exchange with regards to exhibitions, activities, and scholarly cooperation.

=== Non-geographically designated collections ===
==== Arms and armor ====
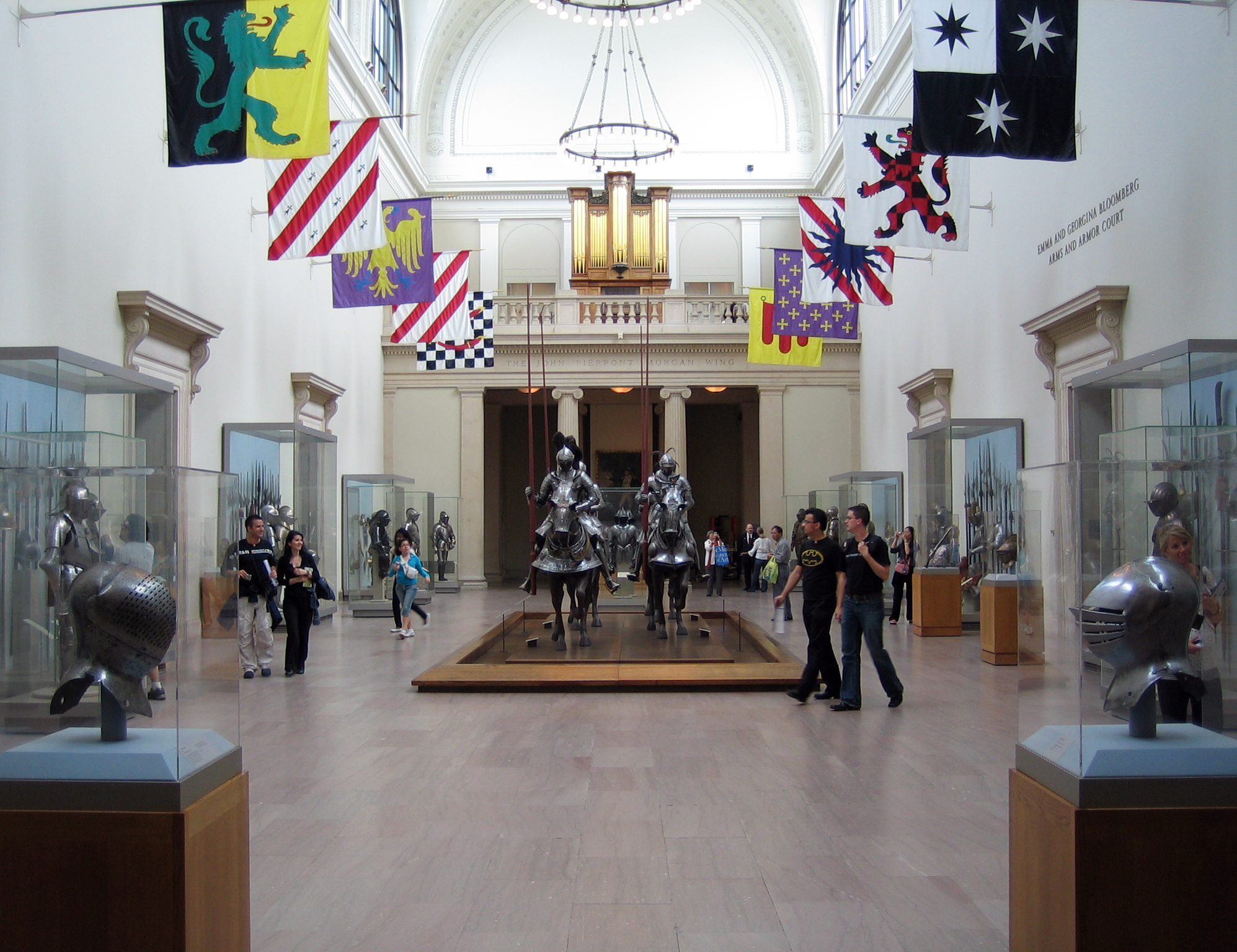
Arms and armor, Middle Ages main hall

The Met's Department of Arms and Armor is one of the museum's most popular collections. Several early trustees of the museum were armor enthusiasts. The 1904 purchase of the collection of Maurice de Talleyrand-Périgord, duc de Dino, served as the foundational collection. It became a great collection with the gift and bequest of the Henry Riggs collection of 2,000 pieces, which was one of the finest assembled by a single person. It came to the museum in 1913 and 1925. Another collection landmark took place in 1936, when George Cameron Stone bequeathed 3,000 pieces of Asian armor. Bashford Dean, the first arms curator, did much to build up the collection, including with gifts he and his friends made directly to the Met, which enabled the purchase of his personal collection.

Stephen V. Grancsay, the second arms curator at the museum, ably added to the collection, and he even purchased important works from Clarence H. Mackay (the greatest contemporary private collector of this material, who was wiped out by the Great Depression). Grancsay later resold some of these important works to the museum at cost.

The department's focus on "outstanding craftsmanship and decoration," including pieces intended solely for display, means that the collection is strongest in late medieval European pieces and Japanese pieces from the 5th through 19th centuries. However, these are not the only cultures represented in Arms and Armor; the collection spans more geographic regions than almost any other department, including weapons and armor from dynastic Egypt, ancient Greece, the Roman Empire, the ancient Near East, Africa, Oceania, and the Americas, as well as American firearms (especially Colt firearms) from the 19th and 20th centuries. Among the collection's 14,000 objects are the oldest items in the museum: flint bifaces which date to 700,000–200,000 BCE. There are also many pieces made for and used by kings and princes, including armor belonging to Henry VIII of England, Henry II of France, and Ferdinand I, Holy Roman Emperor. A. Hyatt Mayor called the Met's collection "the only single collection from which one might illustrate the whole history of the subject.

The distinctive "parade" of armored figures on horseback installed in the first-floor Arms and Armor gallery was organized with the help of Leonid Tarassuk (1925–90), a senior research associate specializing in arms and armor.

In 2020 the Met announced Ronald S. Lauder's promised gift of 91 objects from his collection, describing it as "the most significant grouping of European arms and armor given to the Museum since 1942," one that is "outstanding for the exceptional rarity and quality of the objects, their illustrious origins, and their typological variety." Lauder, who noted that he had begun collecting with the assistance of curator Grancsay almost 55 years earlier, also donated money for the study and presentation of arms and armor. The 11 galleries were named in Lauder's honor.

==== Costume Institute ====
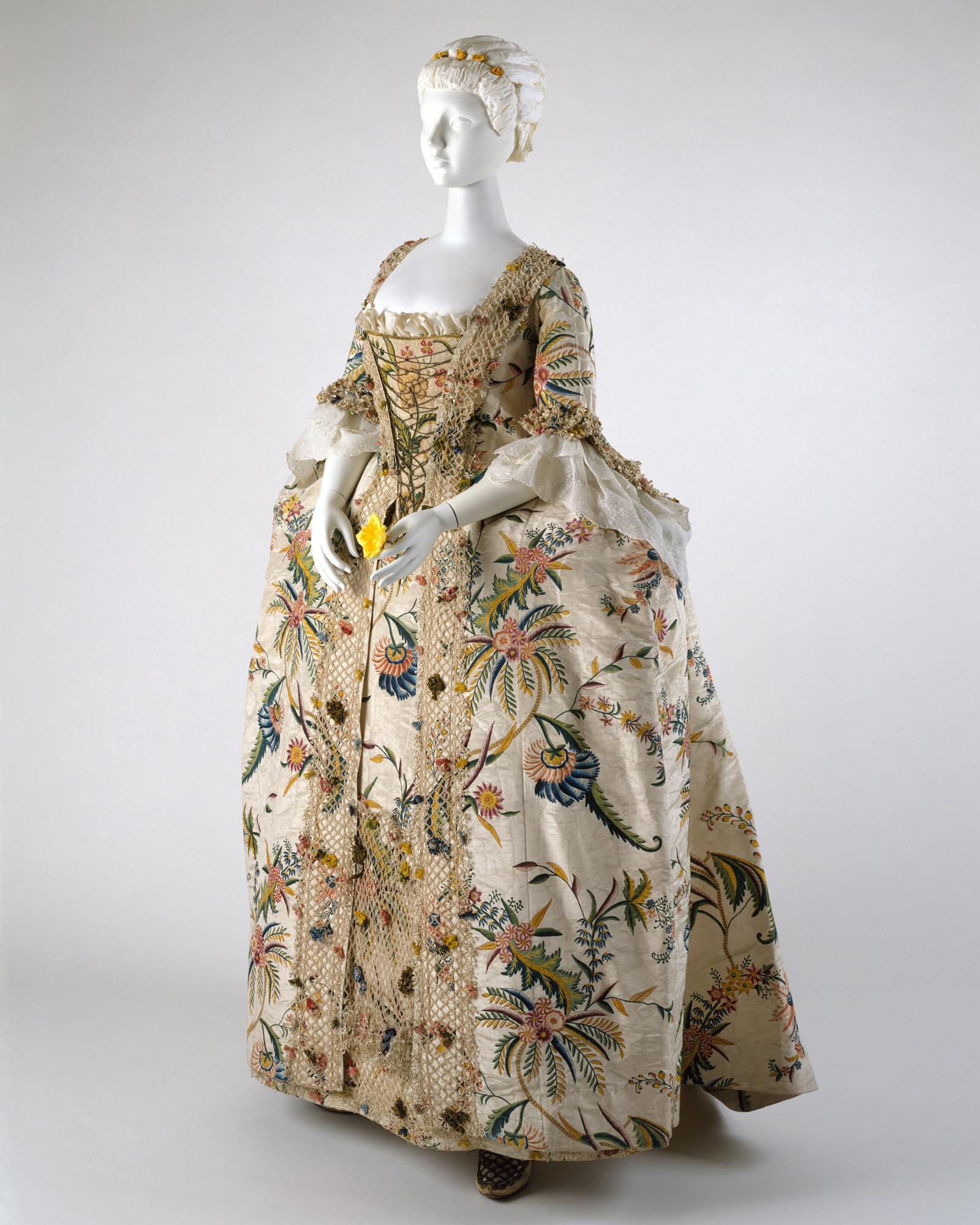
Robe à la française 1740s, as seen in one of the exhibits at the Costume Institute

The Museum of Costume Art was founded by Aline Bernstein and Irene Lewisohn. In 1946, with the financial support of the fashion industry, the Museum of Costume Art merged with The Metropolitan Museum of Art as The Costume Institute, and in 1959 became a curatorial department. Today, its collection contains more than 35,000 costumes and accessories. The Costume Institute used to have a permanent gallery space in what was known as the "Basement" area of the Met because it was downstairs at the bottom of the Met facility. However, due to the fragile nature of the items in the collection, the Costume Institute does not maintain a permanent installation. Instead, every year it holds two separate shows in the Met's galleries using costumes from its collection, with each show centering on a specific designer or theme. The Costume Institute is known for hosting the annual Met Gala and in the past has presented summer exhibitions such as Savage Beauty and China: Through the Looking Glass.

In past years, Costume Institute shows organized around designers such as Cristóbal Balenciaga, Chanel, Yves Saint Laurent, and Gianni Versace; and style doyenne like Diana Vreeland, Mona von Bismarck, Babe Paley, Jayne Wrightsman, Jacqueline Kennedy Onassis, Nan Kempner, and Iris Apfel have drawn significant crowds to the Met. The Costume Institute's annual Benefit Gala, co-chaired by Vogue editor-in-chief Anna Wintour, is an extremely popular, if exclusive, event in the fashion world; in 2007, the 700 available tickets started at $6,500 (~$9,709 in 2025) per person. Exhibits displayed over the past decade in the Costume Institute include: Rock Style, in 1999, representing the style of more than 40 rock musicians, including Madonna, David Bowie, and the Beatles; Extreme Beauty: The Body Transformed, in 2001, which exposes the transforming ideas of physical beauty over time and the bodily contortion necessary to accommodate such ideals and fashion; The Chanel Exhibit, displayed in 2005, acknowledging the skilled work of designer Coco Chanel as one of the leading fashion names in history; Superheroes: Fashion and Fantasy, exhibited in 2008, suggesting the metaphorical vision of superheroes as ultimate fashion icons; the 2010 exhibit on the American Woman: Fashioning a National Identity, which exposes the revolutionary styles of the American woman from the years 1890 to 1940, and how such styles reflect the political and social sentiments of the time. The theme of the 2011 event was "Alexander McQueen: Savage Beauty". Each of these exhibits explores fashion as a mirror of cultural values and offers a glimpse into historical styles, emphasizing their evolution into today's own fashion world. On January 14, 2014, the Met named the Costume Institute complex after Anna Wintour. The curator is Andrew Bolton.

In February 2026, the museum completed a major layout update, dedicating the newly designated 12,000-square-foot Condé M. Nast Galleries adjacent to the Great Hall to serve as a permanent, flexible rotating space for the Costume Institute.

==== Drawings and prints ====
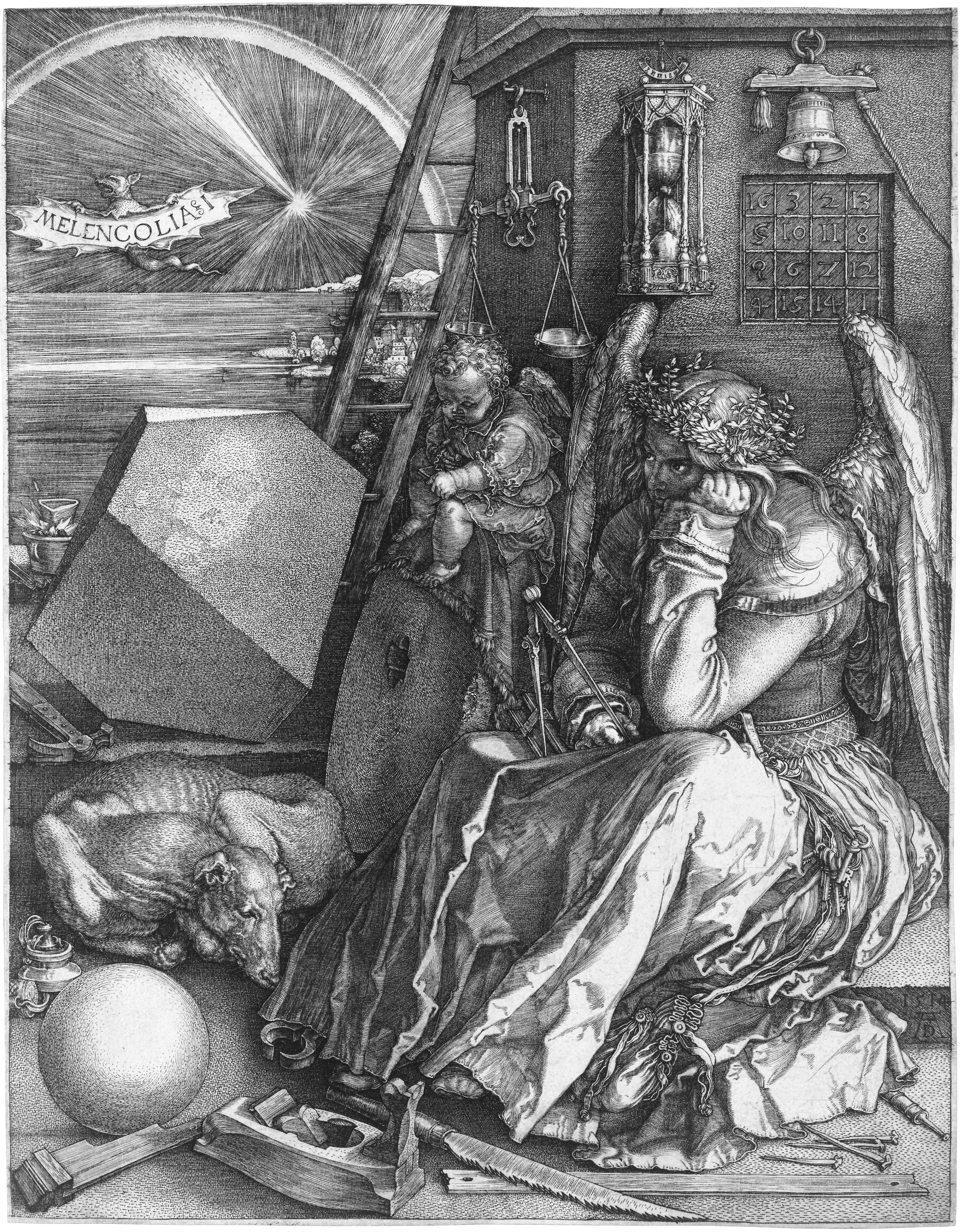
Melencolia I by Albrecht Dürer

Though other departments contain significant numbers of drawings and prints, the Drawings and Prints department specifically concentrates on North American pieces and Western European works produced after the Middle Ages. The first gift of Old Master drawings, comprising 670 sheets, was presented as a single group in 1880 by Cornelius Vanderbilt II, though most proved to be misattributed. The Vanderbilt gift launched the collection, and the Department of Paintings also eventually acquired drawings (including by Michelangelo and Leonardo). In the meantime, the Met library began to collect prints. Harris Brisbane Dick's donation of thirty-five hundred works on paper (mostly nineteenth-century etchings) and a fund for acquisitions led to the hiring of William M. Ivins Jr. in 1916.

As the museum's first curator of prints, Ivins established the mission of collecting images that would reveal "the whole gamut of human life and endeavor, from the most ephemeral of courtesies to the loftiest pictorial presentation of man's spiritual aspirations." Over the next 30 years, he built what is credited as the best collection in the nation. Ivins opened three galleries and a study room in 1971. He curated almost sixty exhibitions, and his influential publications included How Prints Look (1943) and Prints and Visual Communication (1953), in addition to almost two hundred articles for the museum's Bulletin. Ivins and his successor A. Hyatt Mayor (hired 1932, 1946–66 Curator of Prints) collected hundreds of thousands of works, including photographs, books, architectural drawings, modern artworks on paper, posters, trade cards, and other ephemera. Important early donors to the department include: Junius Spencer Morgan II, who presented a broad range of material, mainly 16th century, including woodblocks and many prints by Albrecht Dürer in 1919; Gothic woodcuts and Rembrandt etchings from the Felix M. Warburg family; James Clark McGuire's transformative bequest brought over seven hundred fifteenth-century woodcuts; prints by Rembrandt, Edgar Degas, and Mary Cassatt with the H.O. Havemeyer Collection in 1929. Ivins also purchased five albums from the auction of the Earl of Pembroke's collection, and the 2,200 prints in these albums provided a nucleus of Italian prints.

Meanwhile, acquisitions of drawings, including an album of 50 Goyas (thanks to Ivins, the Met collected almost 300 works by Goya on paper) continued to be processed through the Department of Paintings. In 1960, a Department of Drawings was established under Jacob Bean, who served as curator until 1992, during which time the museum's collection of drawings nearly doubled in size, with strengths in French and Italian works.

Finally, in 1993, a unified Department of Drawings and Prints was created for all works on paper, chaired by George Goldner, who sought to rectify collecting imbalances by adding works by Dutch, Flemish, Central European, Danish, and British artists. The department has been led by Nadine Orenstein, Drue Heinz Curator in Charge since 2015. A particularly important recent gift was that of the Leslie and Johanna Garfield Collection of British Modernism in 2019. Another major gift was that of the Pinkowitz Collection, featuring more than 300 prints "by artists from or working in Mexico," including José Guadalupe Posada, Diego Rivera, the Taller Gráfica Popular, and Elizabeth Catlett. It filled important gaps in the collection, and it brought the total number of Mexican prints to 2000, making the Met one of the best collections in the country. The exhibition "Mexican Prints at the Vanguard," which included Pinkowitz prints, showcased the museum's collection in 2024.

The broadened collecting horizons of the museum in the post-Black Lives Matter era have been displayed in the exhibition of contemporary political works on paper called "Revolution, Resistance, and Activism", held at the Met in 2021–22. It included such works as the Guerrilla Girls' famous poster Do women have to be naked to get into the Met. Museum?, 1987, Julie Torres' Super Diva!, 2020 (a posthumous image of Supreme Court Justice Ruth Bader Ginsburg), and Ben Blount's Black Women's Wisdom, 2019.

Currently, the Drawings and Prints collection contains about 21,000 drawings, 1.2 million prints, and 12,000 illustrated books made in Europe and the Americas. Many of the great masters of European painting, who produced many more sketches and drawings than actual paintings, are represented in the Drawing and Prints collection, sometimes in great concentrations. Prints are also represented in multiple states. Many artists and makers whose work is in the prints and drawings collection are otherwise not represented in the museum's holdings.

==== Robert Lehman Collection ====
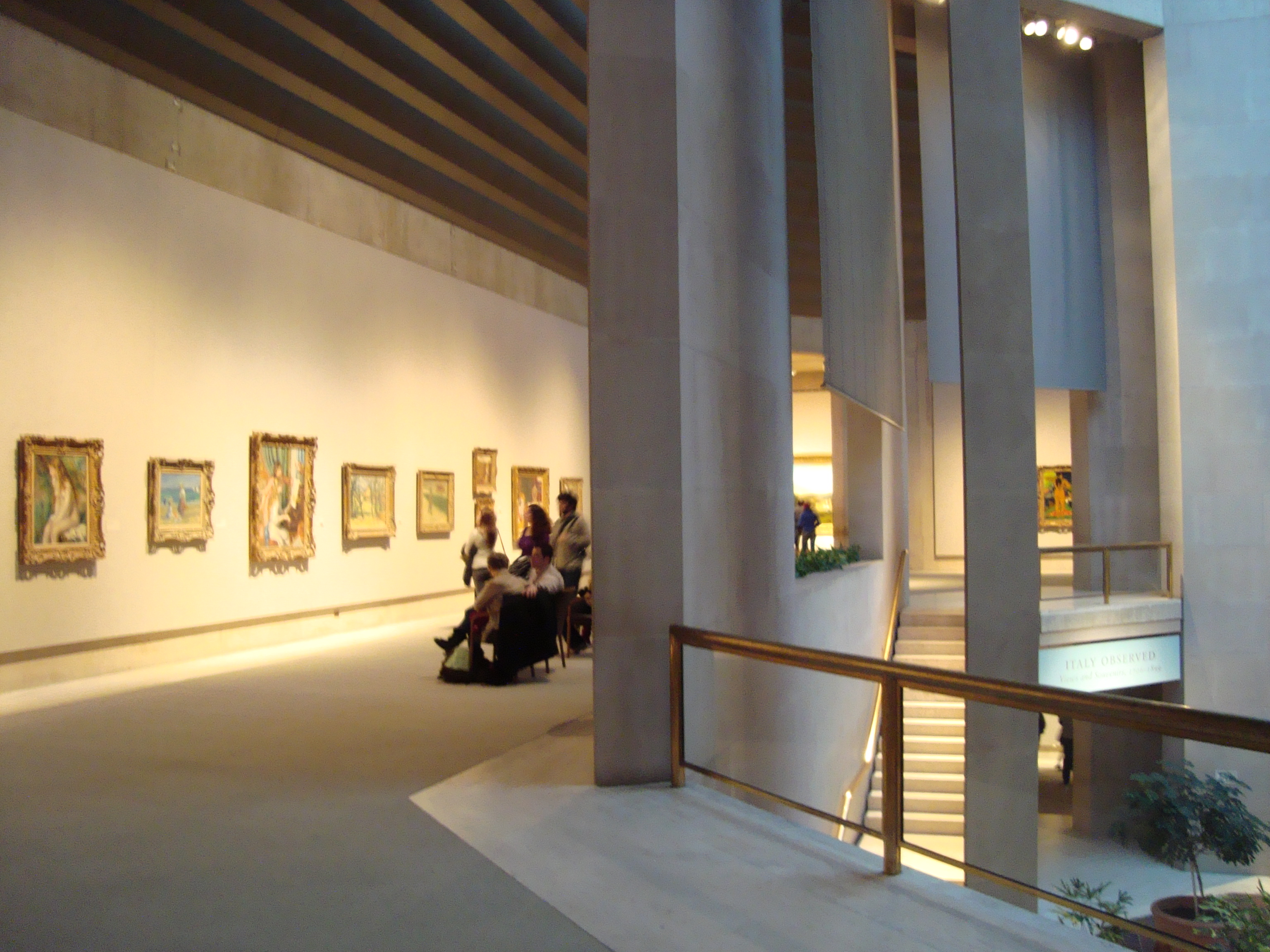
Robert Lehman Wing

On the death of banker Robert Lehman in 1969, his Foundation donated 2,600 works of art to the museum, which had been collected by Robert and his father. Housed in the "Robert Lehman Wing", on the ground floor and the basement level, the museum refers to the collection as "one of the most extraordinary private art collections ever assembled in the United States". To emphasize the personal nature of the Robert Lehman Collection, the Met housed the collection in a special set of galleries, some of which evoked the interior of Lehman's richly decorated townhouse at 7 West 54th Street. This intentional separation of the Collection as a "museum within the museum" met with mixed criticism and approval at the time, though the acquisition of the collection was seen as a coup for the Met. Some have argued that it would be educationally more beneficial to have works from given schools of painting in the same section of the museum.

Unlike other departments at the Met, the Robert Lehman collection does not concentrate on a specific style or period of art; rather, it is a reflection of Lehman's personal collecting interests. The Lehmans concentrated heavily on paintings of the Italian Renaissance, particularly the Sienese school. Sienese highlights include multiple major paintings by Ugolino da Siena, Simone Martini, Sano di Pietro, and Giovanni di Paolo, as well as a remarkable work by the Osservanza Master. Other choice Italian paintings in the collection include masterpieces like Botticelli's Annunciation, a pair of stunning portraits by Jacometto Veneziano, and a stellar Madonna and Child by Giovanni Bellini. The Northern school of painting is represented by Petrus Christus, Hans Memling, the Master of Moulins (Jean Hey), Hans Holbein, and Lucas Cranach and his studio. Dutch and Spanish Baroque highlights include the Spanish painters El Greco and Goya, and the Dutch masters Rembrandt, Ter Borch, and de Hooch.

Lehman's collection of 700 drawings by the Old Masters, featuring works by Rembrandt and Dürer, is particularly valuable for its breadth and quality. The collection also has French 18th and 19th century drawings, as well as nearly two-hundred 18th century Venetian drawings, mostly by the Tiepolos.

His collection includes bronzes, furniture, Renaissance majolica, Venetian glass, enamels, jewelry, textiles, and frames from the beginning of the fifteenth century to the 1600s.

Robert Lehman also collected many nineteenth and twentieth century paintings. These include works by Ingres, Corot, the Barbizon School, Monet, Renoir, Cezanne, Gauguin, Van Gogh, Seurat, and a number of Fauve painters, including Matisse. Princeton University Press has documented the massive collection in a multi-volume book series published as The Robert Lehman Collection Catalogues.

==== Medieval art and the Cloisters ====
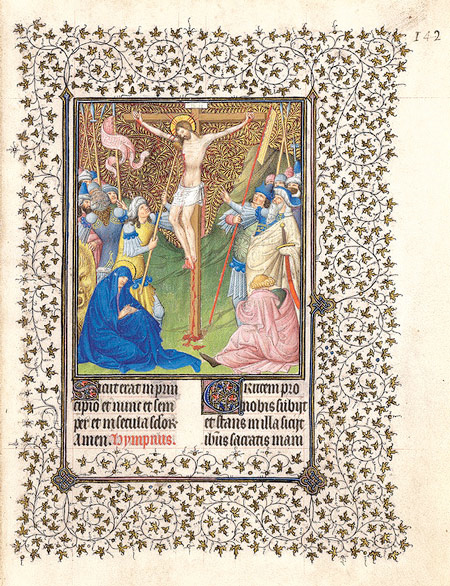
The Limbourg brothers' Belles Heures of Jean de France, Duc de Berry

The Met's collection of medieval art consists of a comprehensive range of Western art from the 4th through the early 16th centuries, as well as Byzantine and pre-medieval European antiquities not included in the Ancient Greek and Roman collection. Like the Islamic collection, the Medieval collection contains a broad range of two- and three-dimensional art, with religious objects heavily represented. In total, the Medieval Art department's permanent collection numbers over 10,000 separate objects, divided between the main museum building on Fifth Avenue and The Cloisters.

===== Main building =====
The medieval collection in the main Metropolitan building, centered on the first-floor medieval gallery, contains about 6,000 separate objects. While a great deal of European medieval art is on display in these galleries, most of the European pieces are concentrated at the Cloisters (see below). However, this allows the main galleries to display much of the Met's Byzantine art side by side with European pieces. The main gallery is host to a wide range of tapestries and church and funerary statuary, while side galleries display smaller works of precious metals and ivory, including reliquary pieces and secular items. The main gallery, with its high arched ceiling, also serves double duty as the annual site of the Met's elaborately decorated Christmas tree.

===== The Cloisters museum and gardens =====
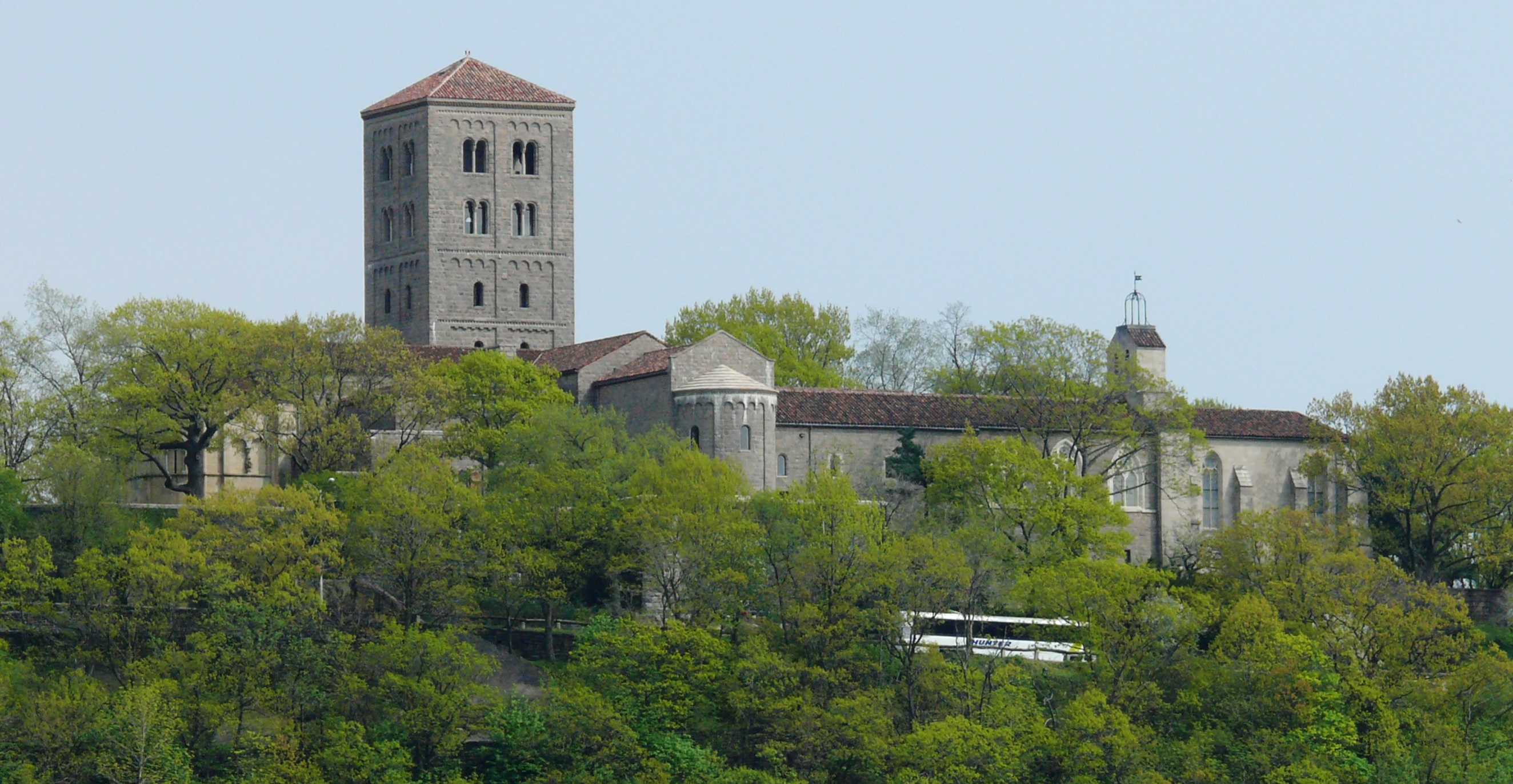
The Cloisters from the Hudson River

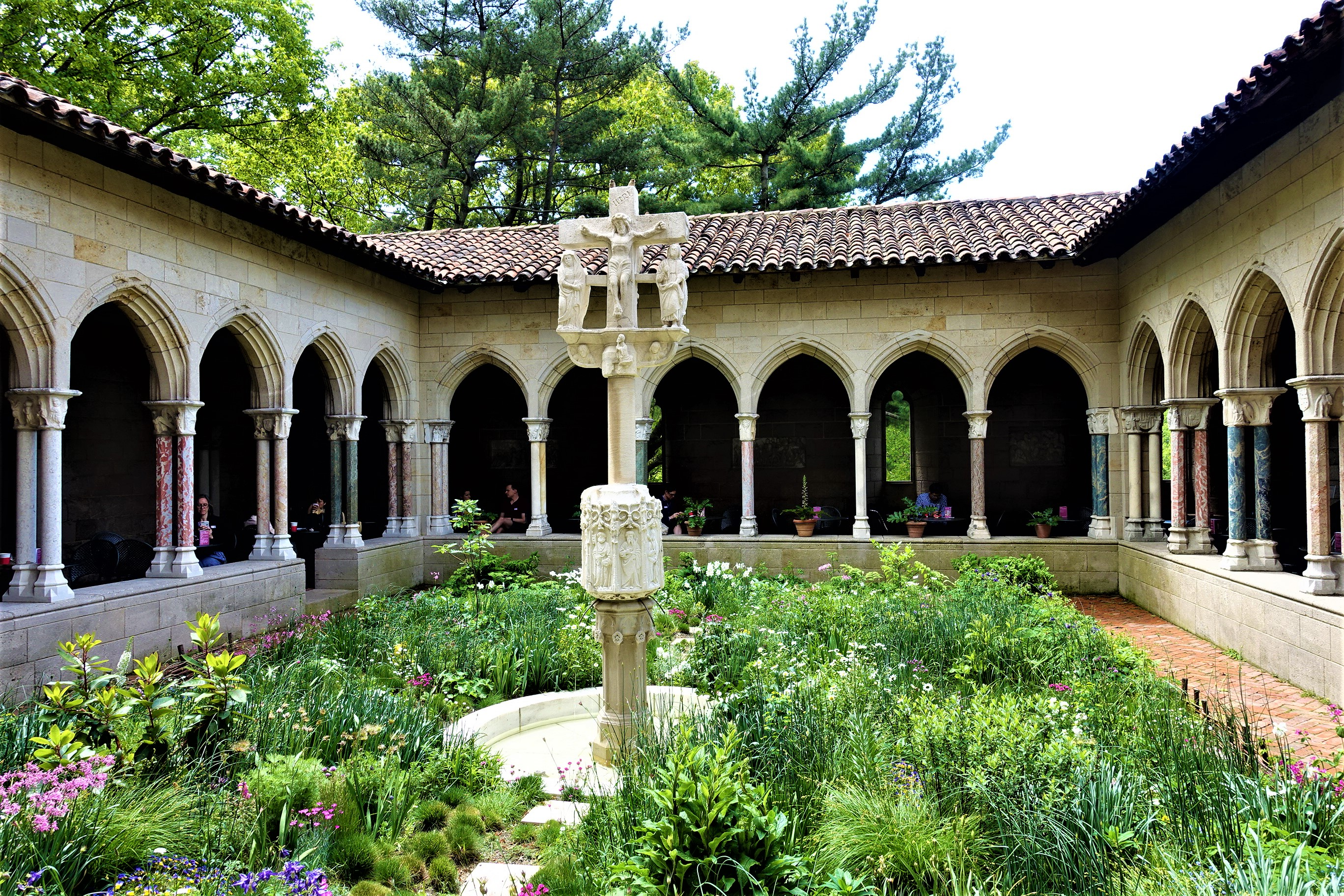
Interior of the Cloisters

The Cloisters was a principal project of John D. Rockefeller Jr., a major benefactor of the Met. Located in Fort Tryon Park and completed in 1938, it is a separate building dedicated solely to medieval art. The Cloisters collection was originally that of a separate museum, assembled by George Grey Barnard and acquired in toto by Rockefeller in 1925 as a gift to the Met.

The Cloisters are so named on account of the five medieval French cloisters whose salvaged structures were incorporated into the modern building, and the five thousand objects at the Cloisters are strictly limited to medieval European works. The collection features items of outstanding beauty and historical importance; among these are the Belles Heures of Jean de France, Duc de Berry illustrated by the Limbourg Brothers in 1409, the Romanesque altar cross known as the "Cloisters Cross" or "Bury Cross", and the seven tapestries depicting the Hunt of the Unicorn.

==== Modern and contemporary art ====
With some 13,000 artworks, primarily by European and American artists, the modern art collection occupies 60,000 square feet (6,000 m^{2}), of gallery space and contains many iconic modern works. Cornerstones of the collection include Picasso's portrait of Gertrude Stein, Jasper Johns's White Flag, Jackson Pollock's Autumn Rhythm (Number 30), and Max Beckmann's triptych Beginning. Certain artists are represented in remarkable depth, for a museum whose focus is not exclusively on modern art: for example, ninety works constitute the museum's Paul Klee collection, donated by Heinz Berggruen, spanning the entirety of the artist's life. Due to the Met's long history, "contemporary" paintings acquired in years past have often migrated to other collections at the museum, particularly to the American and European Paintings departments.

In April 2013, it was reported that the museum was to receive a collection worth $1 billion (~$1.36 billion in 2025) from cosmetics tycoon Leonard Lauder. The collection of Cubist art includes work by Pablo Picasso, Georges Braque and Juan Gris and went on display in 2014. The Met has since added to the collection, for example spending $31.8 million (~$40.1 million in 2025) for Gris' The musician's table in 2018.

==== Musical instruments ====
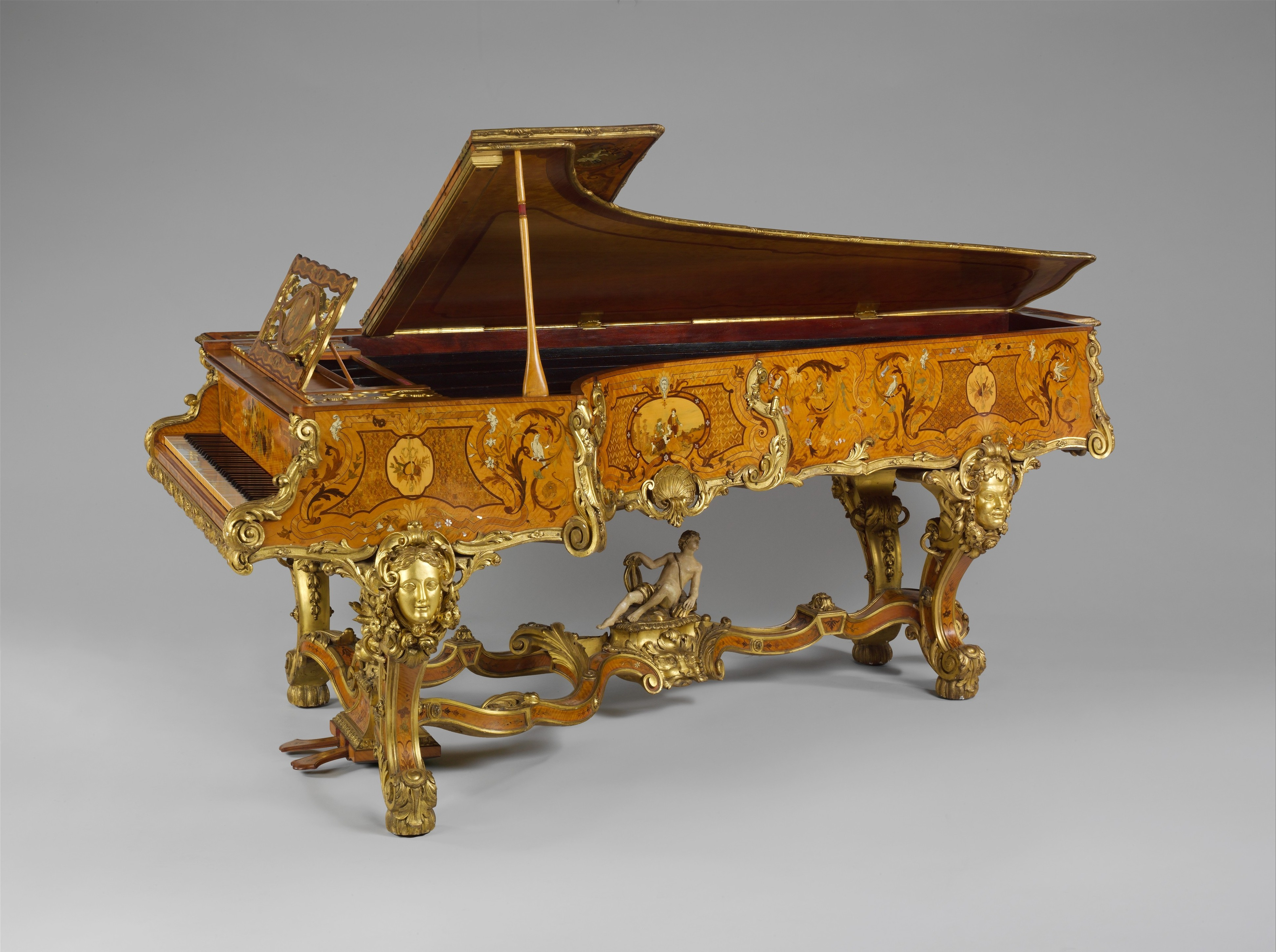
Grand piano by Sébastien Érard, c. 1840

The Met's collection of musical instruments, with about 5,000 examples of musical instruments from all over the world, is virtually unique among major museums. The collection began in 1889 with a donation of 270 instruments by Mary Elizabeth Adams Brown, who joined her collection to become the museum's first curator of musical instruments, named in honor of her husband, John Crosby Brown. By the time she died, the collection had 3,600 instruments that she had donated and the collection was housed in five galleries. Instruments were (and continue to be) included in the collection not only on aesthetic grounds, but also insofar as they embodied technical and social aspects of their cultures of origin. The modern Musical Instruments collection is encyclopedic in scope; every continent is represented at virtually every stage of its musical life. Highlights of the department's collection include several Stradivari violins, a collection of Asian instruments made from precious metals, and the oldest surviving piano, a 1720 model by Bartolomeo Cristofori. Many of the instruments in the collection are playable, and the department encourages their use by holding concerts and demonstrations by guest musicians.

==== Photographs ====
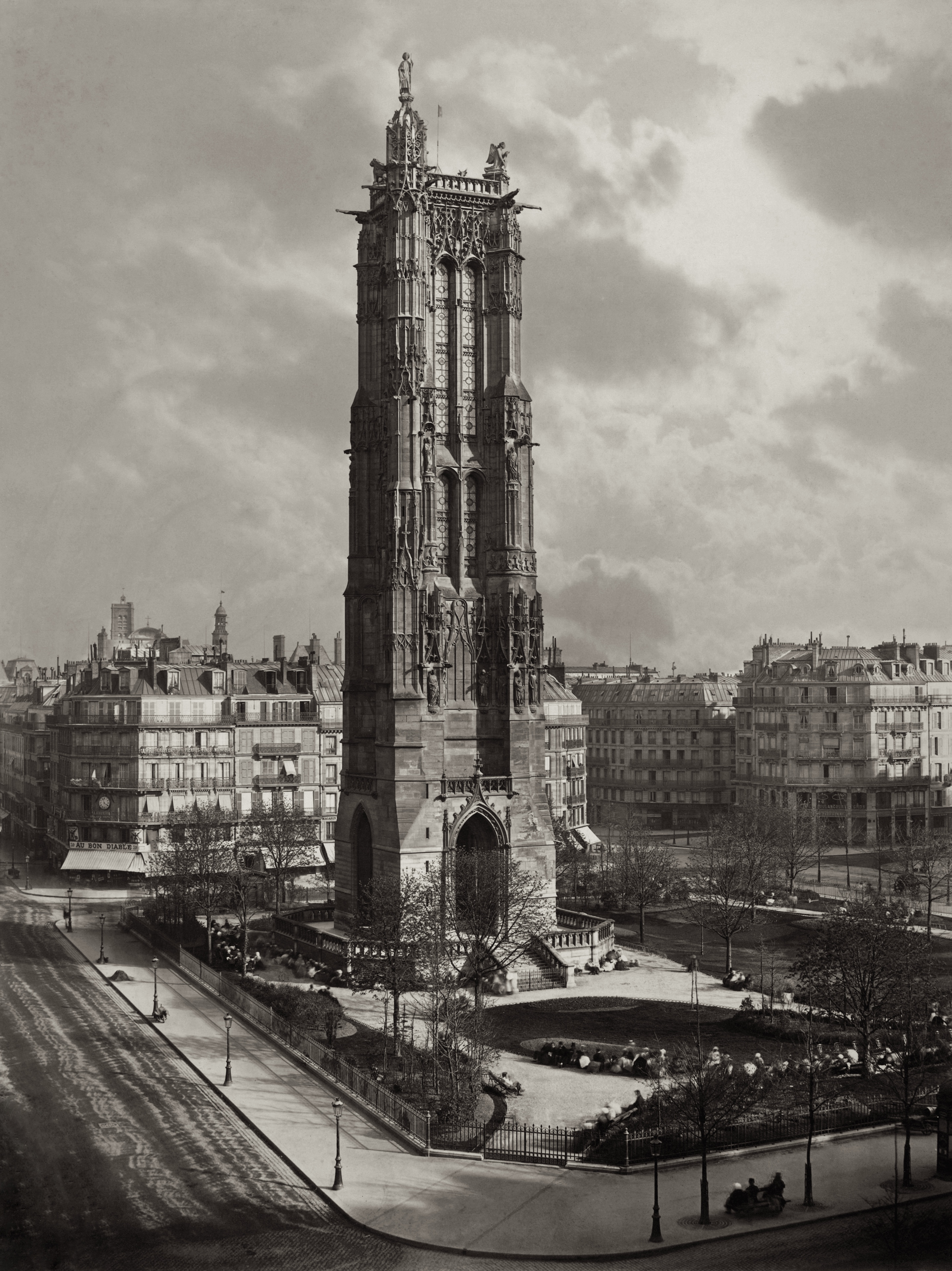
La Tour St. Jacques La Boucherie à Paris by Charles Soulier, 1867

The Met's collection of photographs, numbering more than 25,000 in total, is centered on five major collections plus additional acquisitions by the museum. Alfred Stieglitz, a photographer himself, donated the first major collection of photographs to the museum, which included a comprehensive survey of Photo-Secessionist works, a rich set of master prints by Edward Steichen, and an outstanding collection of Stieglitz's photographs from his own studio. The Met supplemented Stieglitz's gift with the 8,500-piece Gilman Paper Company Collection, the Rubel Collection, and the Ford Motor Company Collection, which respectively provided the collection with early French and American photography, early British photography, and post-WWI American and European photography. The museum also acquired Walker Evans's personal collection of photographs, a particular coup considering the high demand for his works.

The department of photography was founded in 1992. Though the department gained a permanent gallery in 1997, not all of the department's holdings are on display at any given time, due to the sensitive materials represented in the photography collection. However, the Photographs department has produced some of the best-received temporary exhibits in the Met's recent past, including a Diane Arbus retrospective and an extensive show devoted to spirit photography. In 2007, the museum designated a gallery exclusively for the exhibition of photographs made after 1960.

==== Film ====
The Met has an extensive archive consisting of 1,500 films made and collected by the museum since the 1920s. As part of the museum's 150 anniversary commemoration, since January 2020, the museum uploads a film from its archive weekly onto YouTube.

The Met collection

=== Digital representation of collections ===
Beginning in 2013, the Met organized the Digital Media Department for the purpose of increasing access of the museum's collections and resources using digital media and expanded website services. The first Chief Digital Officer Sree Sreenivasan from 2013 departed in 2016 and was replaced by Loic Tallon at the time that the department became known by its simplified designation as the Digital Department. At the start of 2017, the department began its Open Access initiative summarized on the Met's website titled "Digital Underground" stating: "It's been six months since the Met launched its Open Access initiative, which made available all 375,000+ images of public-domain works in the Met collection under Creative Commons Zero (CC0). During what is just the dawn of this new initiative, the responses so far have been incredible." At that time, more than 375,000 photographic images from the museum's archival collection were released for public domain reproduction and use both by the general public and by large public access websites such as those available at Google BigQuery.

In May 2022, the Met and the World Monuments Fund announced a collaboration of digital work for the 2024 reopening of the African, ancient American, and Oceanic art galleries. The digital project "aims to bolster the understanding of several historic sites in sub-Saharan Africa", in particular sites that have been minimally explored by Western museums.

Open access images and data have been viewed over 1.2 billion times with over 7 million downloads.

== Libraries ==
Many curatorial departments maintain a library, most of the material of which can be requested online through the libraries' catalog. The Thomas J. Watson Library is the central library of The Metropolitan Museum of Art, and supports the activities of staff and researchers. It can be accessed without an appointment. As of July 2026, Watson Library's collection contains approximately 1,030,000 volumes, including monographs and exhibition catalogs; over 32,000 periodical titles; and more than 144,900 auction and sale catalogs. The library includes a reference collection, auction and sale catalogs, a rare book collection, manuscript items, and vertical file collections. The library is accessible to anyone 18 years of age or older through registering online and providing photo ID.

== Special exhibitions ==
The museum regularly hosts notable special exhibitions, often focusing on the works of one artist that have been loaned out from a variety of other museums and sources for the duration of the exhibition. These exhibitions are part of the attraction that draw people both within and outside Manhattan to explore the Met. Such exhibitions include displays especially designed for the Costume Institute, paintings from artists from across the world, works of art related to specific art movements, and collections of historical artifacts. Exhibitions are commonly located within their specific departments, ranging from American decorative arts, arms and armor, drawings and prints, Egyptian art, Medieval art, musical instruments, and photographs. Typical exhibitions run for months at a time and are open to the general public. Each exhibition provides insight into the world of art as a transformative, cultural experience and often includes a historical analysis to demonstrate the profound impact that art has on society and its dramatic transformation over the years.

In 1969, a special exhibition, titled "Harlem on My Mind" was criticized for failing to exhibit work by Harlem artists. The museum defended its decision to portray Harlem itself as a work of art. Norman Lewis, Benny Andrews, Romare Bearden, Clifford Joseph, Roy DeCarava, Reginald Gammon, Henri Ghent, Raymond Saunders, and Alice Neel were among the artists who picketed the show.

== Performance arts ==
The museum's Department of Live Arts commissions new works of performance using music, sound, movement, and other artistic practices. Under the banner of MetLiveArts, performances are presented in the Grace Rainey Rogers auditorium and the galleries of the main museum building and The Cloisters, and made available through digital platforms such as YouTube and the museum's own website. Limor Tomer, became general manager of MetLiveArts in 2011, moving the department once known as Concerts and Lectures away from the programs of classical recitals and chamber concerts that were customary at that time.

Sarah Jones replaced Limor Tomer in 2025 as Head of Live Arts.

== History ==
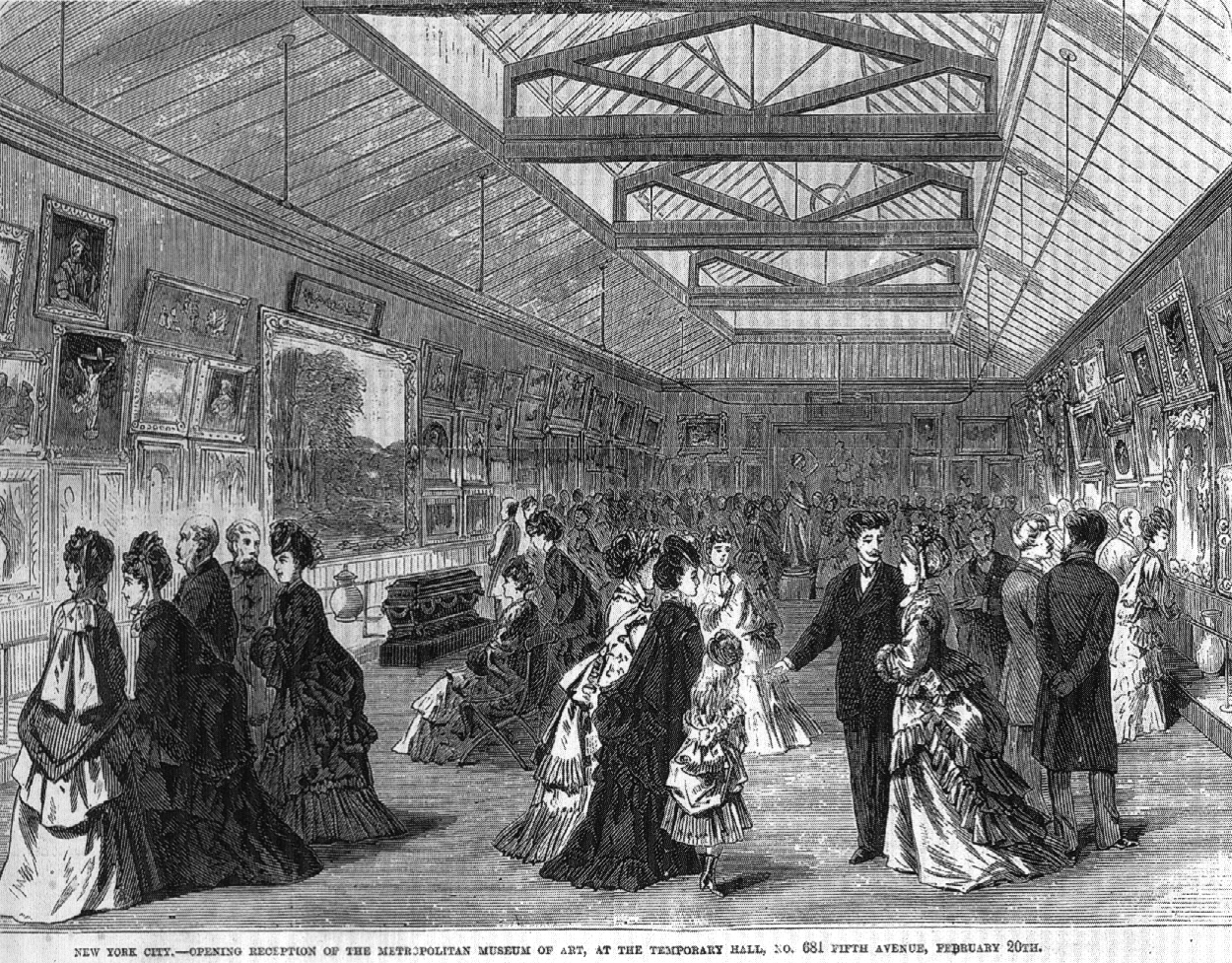
Opening reception in the picture gallery at 681 Fifth Avenue, February 20, 1872; wood-engraving published in Frank Leslie's Weekly, March 9, 1872

=== 19th century ===
The New York State Legislature granted the Metropolitan Museum of Art an Act of Incorporation on April 13, 1870, "for the purpose of establishing and maintaining in said City a Museum and Library of Art, of encouraging and developing the Study of the Fine Arts, and the application of Art to manufacture and natural life, of advancing the general knowledge of kindred subjects, and to that end of furnishing popular instruction and recreations". This legislation was supplemented later by the 1893 Act, Chapter 476, which required that its collections "shall be kept open and accessible to the public free of all charge throughout the year". The founders included businessmen and financiers, among them Theodore Roosevelt Sr., the father of Theodore Roosevelt, the 26th president of the US, as well as leading artists and thinkers of the day, who wanted to open a museum to bring art and art education to the American people. Also instrumental in the founding of the museum was Henry Gurdon Marquand, who donated an important part of his collection of Old Masters paintings to the fledgling institution. The Marquand family, founders of Marquand and Co., maintained a diverse interest in art based philanthropy, having donated large sums of money to Princeton University, as well as establishing Southport's Pequot Library, a special collections institution.

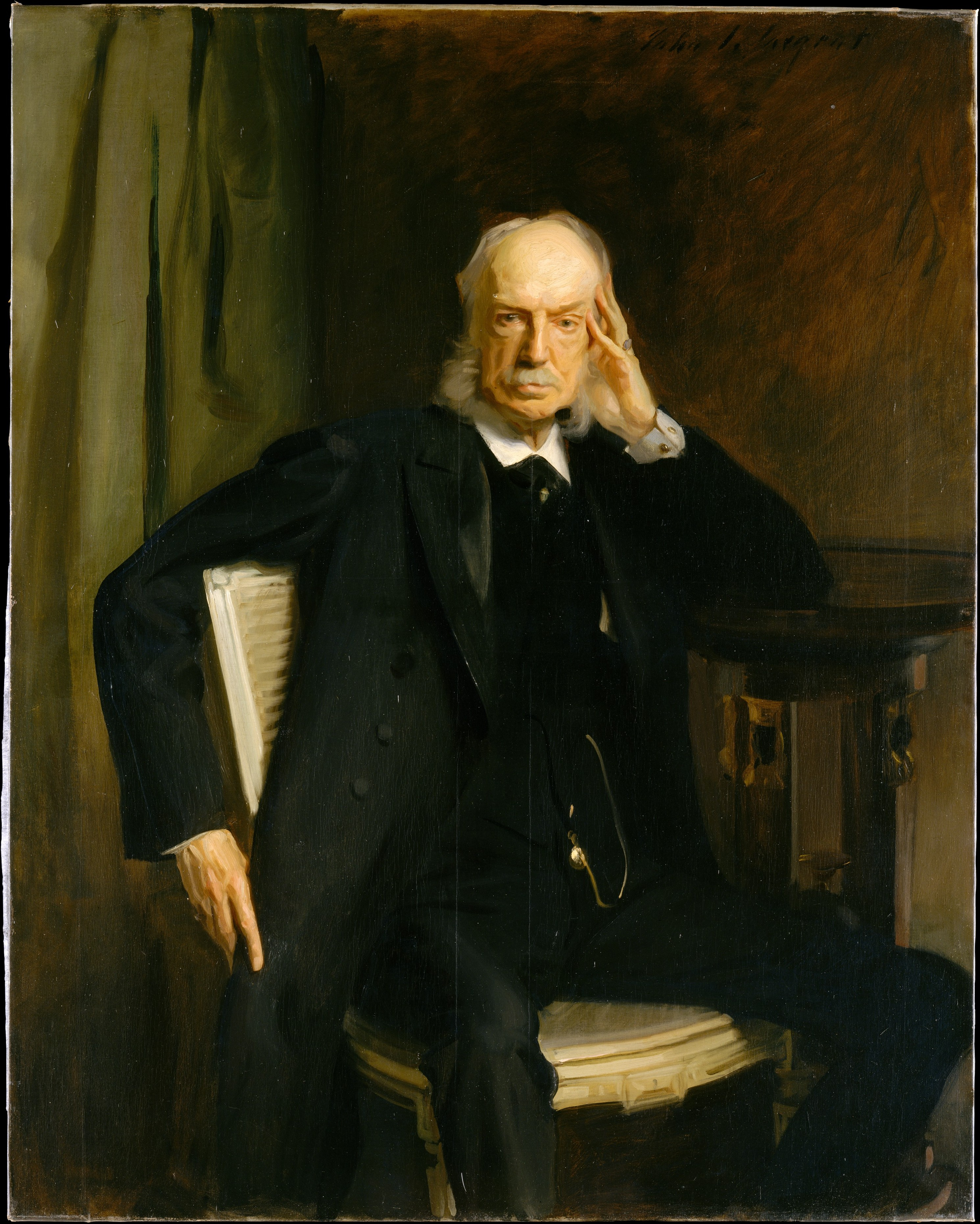
The Metropolitan Museum of Art's second president, Henry Gurdon Marquand. In 1896, the Museum trustees recognized Marquand's vast contributions to the institution by commissioning this portrait by John Singer Sargent.

The museum first opened on February 20, 1872, housed in a building located at 681 Fifth Avenue. John Taylor Johnston, a railroad executive whose personal art collection seeded the museum, served as its first president, and the publisher George Palmer Putnam came on board as its founding superintendent. The artist Eastman Johnson acted as co-founder of the museum, as did landscape painter Frederic Edwin Church. Various other industrialists, artists, and scientists of the age served as co-founders, including Howard Potter, Salem Howe Wales, and Henry Gurdon Marquand. Marquand's donated works are known as the Marquand Collection. The former Civil War officer, Luigi Palma di Cesnola, was named as its first director. He served from 1879 to 1904. Under their guidance, the Met's holdings, initially consisting of a Roman stone sarcophagus and 174 mostly European paintings, quickly outgrew the available space. In 1873, occasioned by the Met's purchase of the Cesnola Collection of Cypriot antiquities, the museum decamped from Fifth Avenue and took up residence at the Mrs. Nicholas Cruger Mansion also known as the Douglas Mansion (James Renwick, 1853–54, demolished 1928) at 128 West 14th Street. However, these new accommodations proved temporary, as the growing collection required more space than the mansion could provide. It moved into the current building in 1880. Between 1879 and 1895, the museum created and operated a series of educational programs, known as the Metropolitan Museum of Art Schools, intended to provide vocational training and classes on fine arts.

=== 20th century ===
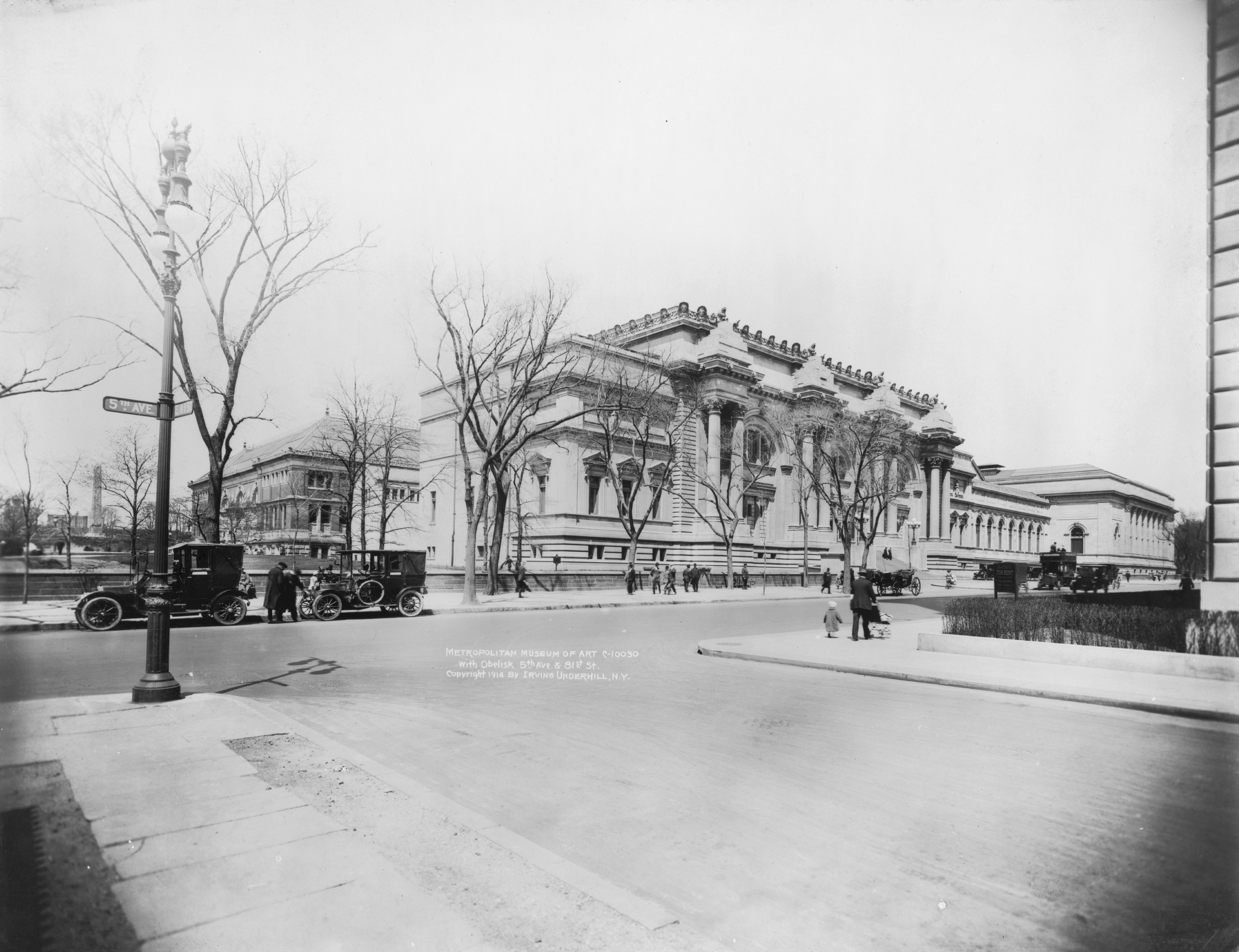
The museum in 1914

The museum is said to have established the world's first museum shop in 1908. In 1954, to mark the opening of its Grace Rainey Rogers concert hall, the museum inaugurated a series of concerts, adding art lectures in 1956. This "Concerts & Lectures program" grew over the years into 200 events each season. The program presented such performers as Marian Anderson, Cecilia Bartoli, Judy Collins, Marilyn Horne, Burl Ives, Juilliard String Quartet, Yo-Yo Ma, Itzhak Perlman, Artur Rubinstein, András Schiff, Nina Simone, Joan Sutherland and André Watts, as well as lectures on art history, music, dance, theater and social history. The program was directed, from its inception to 1968, by William Kolodney, and from 1969 to 2010, by Hilde Limondjian.

In the 1960s, the governance of the Met was expanded to include, for the first time, a chairman of the board of trustees in contemplation of a large bequest from the estate of Robert Lehman. For six decades Lehman built upon an art collection begun by his father in 1911 and devoted a great deal of time to the Met, before finally becoming the first chairman of the board at the Metropolitan in the 1960s. After his death in 1969, the Robert Lehman Foundation donated close to 3,000 works of art to the Metropolitan Museum of Art. Housed in the Robert Lehman Wing, which opened to the public in 1975 and largely financed by the Lehman Foundation, the museum has called it "one of the most extraordinary private art collections ever assembled in the United States".

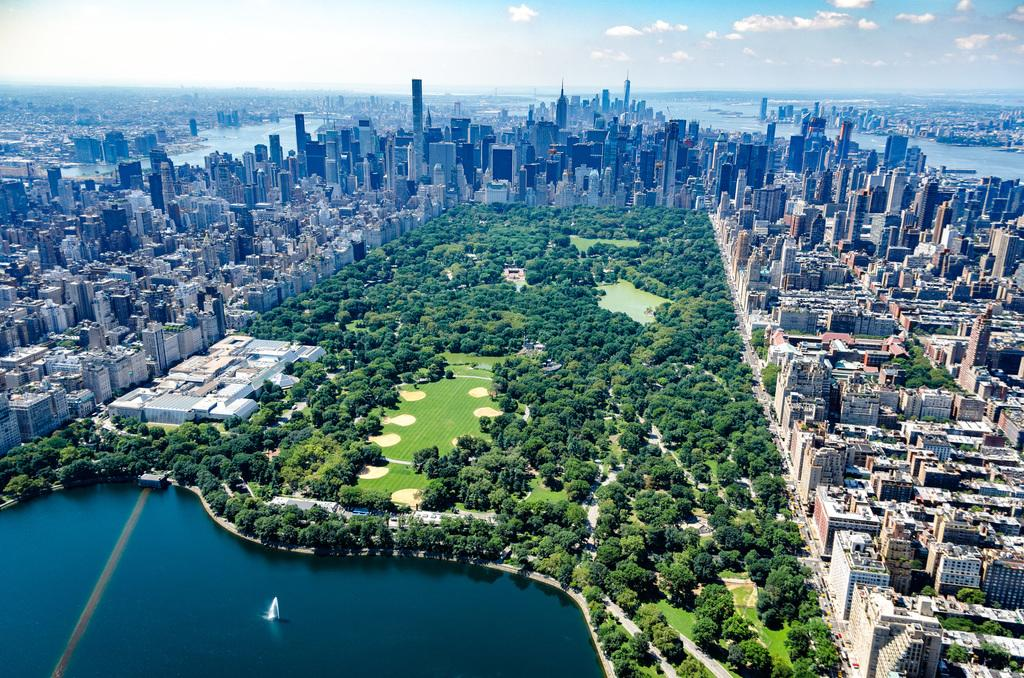
The museum (left foreground) is located in Central Park.

The Metropolitan Museum of Art Centennial was celebrated with exhibitions, symposia, concerts, lectures, the reopening of refurbished galleries, special tours, social events, and other programming for eighteen months from October 1969 through the spring of 1971. The centennial's events (including an open house, Centennial Ball, year-long art history course for the public, and various educational programming and traveling exhibitions) and publications drew on support from prominent New Yorkers, artists, writers, composers, interior designers, and art historians.

=== 21st century ===
In 2009 Michael Gross published The Secret History of the Moguls and the Money That Made the Metropolitan Museum, an unauthorized social history, and the museum bookstore declined to sell it.

In 2012, following the earlier appointment of Daniel Brodsky as chairman of the board at the Met, the by-laws of the museum were formally amended to recognize the office of the chairman as having authority over the assignment and review of both the offices of president and director of the museum. The office of chairman was first introduced relatively late in the museum's history in the 1960s in contemplation of the anticipated donation of the Lehman collection to the museum and has since that time, under Brodsky, become the most senior administrative position at the museum.

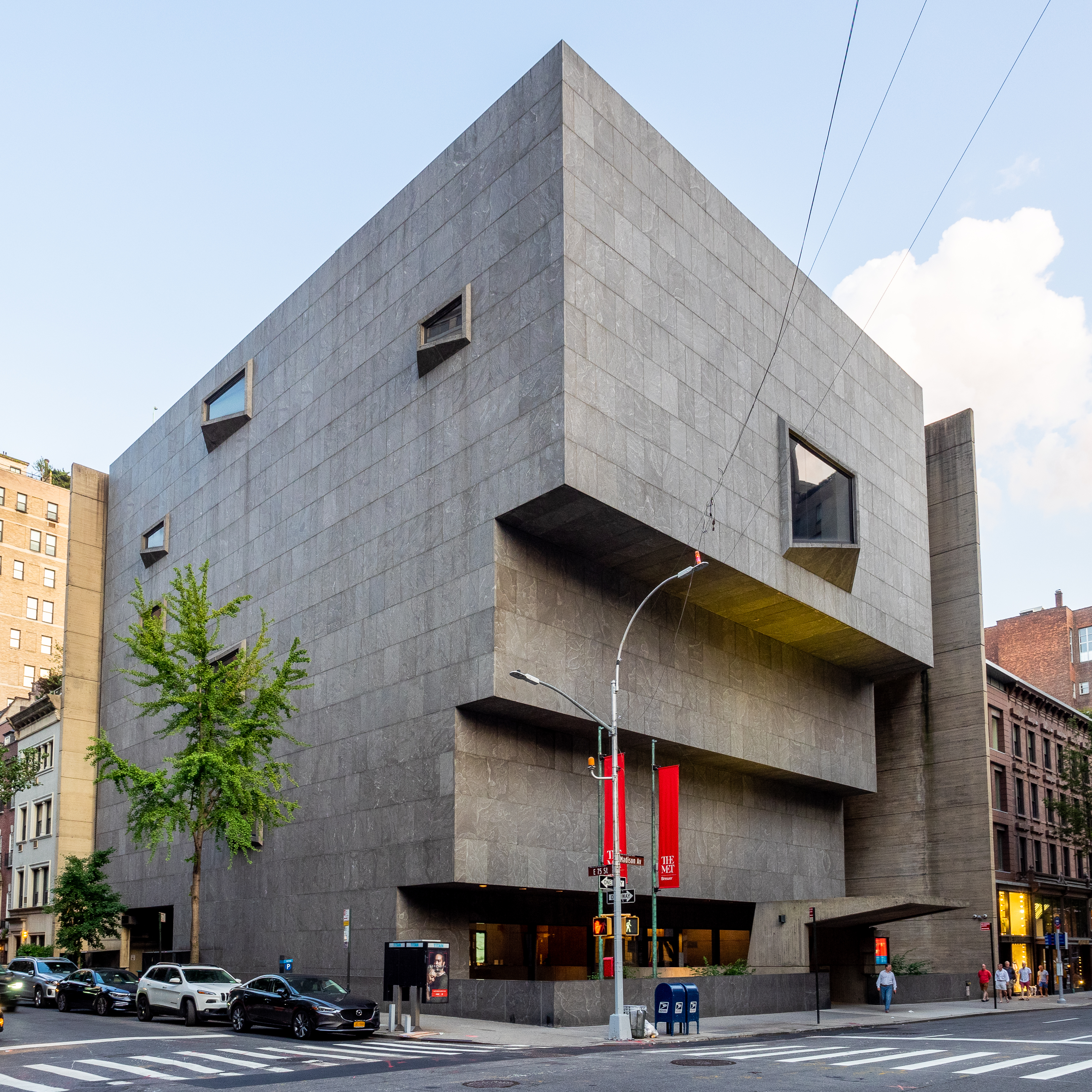
The Met Breuer building in 2019

From 2016 to 2020, the museum operated a modern and contemporary art gallery at 945 Madison Avenue, a Marcel Breuer-designed building at Madison Avenue and 75th Street in Manhattan's Upper East Side, the former Whitney Museum of American Art. It extends the museum's modern and contemporary art program. In September 2018, it was announced that the Met intended to vacate the Met Breuer three years early, in 2020; the Frick Collection began occupying the space while the main building underwent renovations.

In January 2018, museum president Daniel Weiss announced that the century-old policy of free admission would be replaced by a $25 charge to out-of-state and foreign visitors, effective March 2018. The museum temporarily closed in March 2020 during the COVID-19 pandemic in New York City, and reopened in late August; this was the first time in over a century that the Met was closed for more than three consecutive days.

In September 2020, following debates surrounding provenance holes and mismanagement of Indigenous art, the museum appointed Patricia Marroquin Norby (Purépecha/Nde descent) as the museum's inaugural Associate Curator of Native American Art. In May 2021, the museum installed a plaque on its Fifth Avenue facade in recognition of indigenous communities and of the fact that the museum is situated in what was historically Lenapehoking. That November, the Met received a $125 million donation from Oscar L. Tang and Agnes Hsu-Tang, the largest gift in the museum's history. In exchange, the Met named its modern and contemporary art galleries after the Tangs. The following February, the Met hired Moody Nolan to renovate the Ancient Near Eastern and Cypriot galleries. Mexican architect Frida Escobedo was hired in March 2022 to renovate the Tang Wing, and the Met had raised $550 million for the Tang Wing by 2024. Designs for the Tang Wing were announced that December.

In 2024, several protests targeted the Met during the Israel-Gaza war, citing board members' investments in RTX and a lack of public comment around destruction of cultural heritage during the war. Met workers issued an open letter to the director calling for a public statement and to showcase Palestinian art held in storage. In a March 24 protest, advocates for the Palestinian cause and ceasefire laid a quilt on the front steps.

The Michael C. Rockefeller Wing closed temporarily in 2021 for a renovation designed by Beyer Blinder Belle and WHY Architecture. The renovation was finished in May 2025. In January 2026, the museum's workers voted to form a union affiliated with the United Auto Workers. In 2026, the Condé M. Nast Galleries opened at the Met Fifth Avenue.

The museum announced in May 2026 that it would merge with the nearby Neue Galerie New York, a museum dedicated to early modern Austrian and German art founded by collector and philanthropist Ronald Lauder. The merger is set to take place in 2028 when the Metropolitan Museum will take ownership of the Neue Galerie's building and collection; the Neue Galerie will be renamed the Met Ronald S. Lauder Neue Galerie, or the Met Neue Galerie.

== Architecture ==
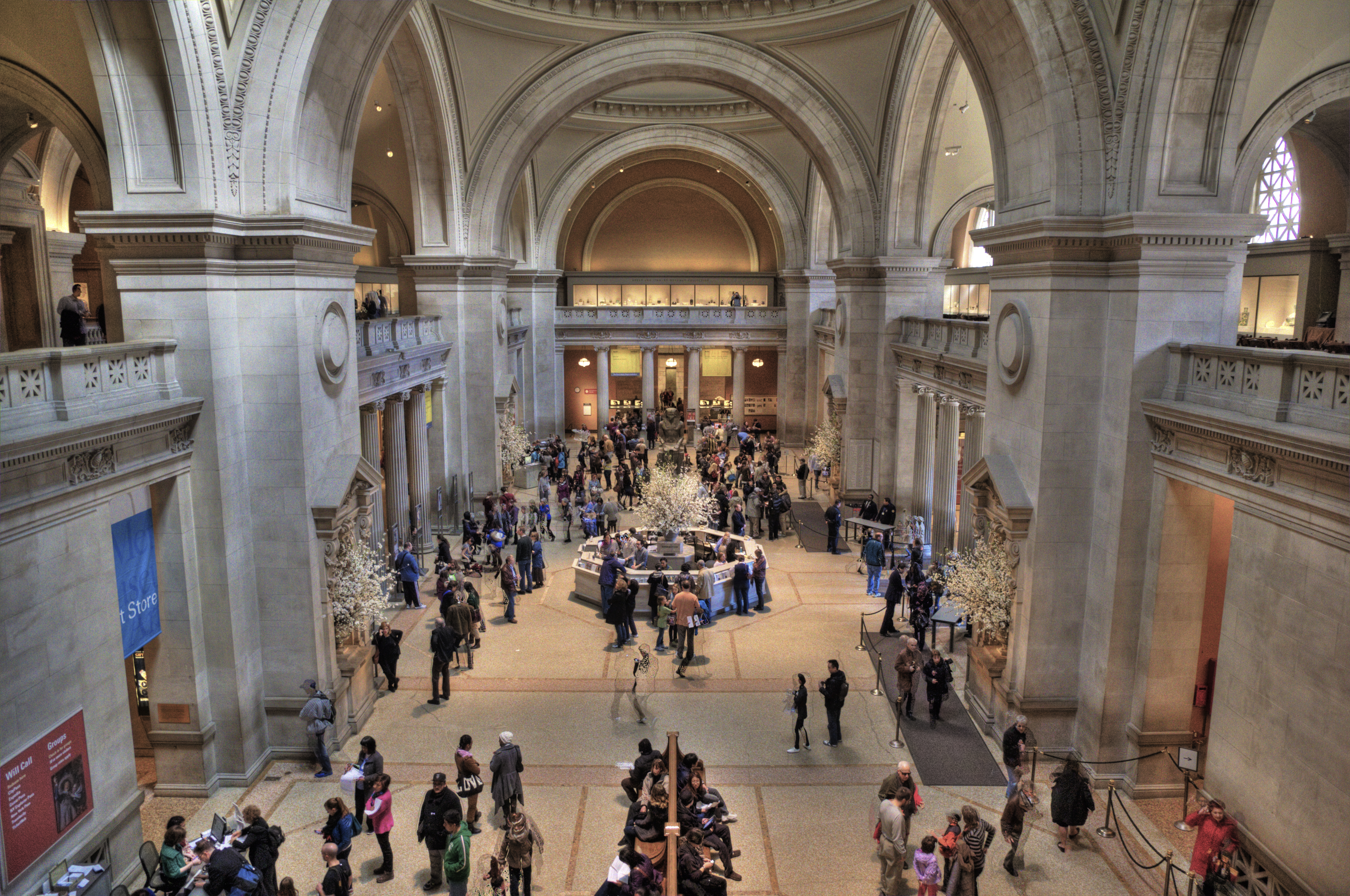
The Great Hall of the Met Fifth Avenue

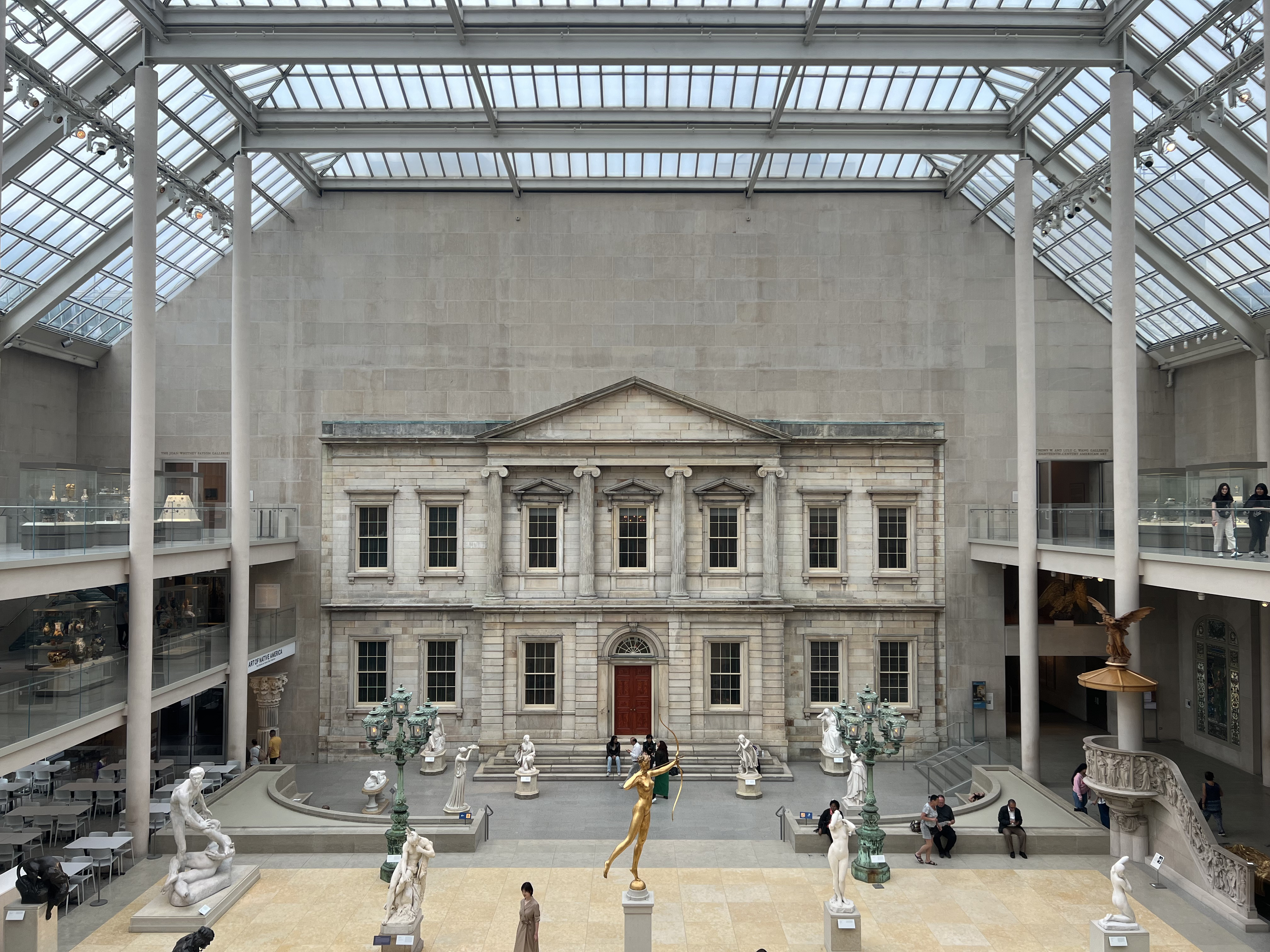
Charles Engelhard Court within the American Wing at the Met Fifth Avenue

After negotiations with the City of New York in 1871, the Met was granted the land between the East Park Drive, Fifth Avenue, and the 79th and 85th Street transverse roads in Central Park. The first part of the Met to be built was a red-brick and stone "mausoleum" designed by American architect Calvert Vaux and his collaborator Jacob Wrey Mould. The steel structure of the building was designed by London-born architects Edward C. and George K. Radford. Mould described Edward Radford as “an engineer of high scientific attainments to whom we entrusted the constructive portions of the iron work [i. e. the steel structure] of the building”. The Fifth Avenue facade, Great Hall, and Grand Stairway were designed in the Beaux-Arts style by Richard Morris Hunt and his son, Richard Howland Hunt, in the late 1890s and early 1900s. The firm of McKim, Mead & White completed the wings on the Fifth Avenue facade in 1910. The modernistic glass sides and rear of the museum are the work of Roche-Dinkeloo.

The Met Fifth Avenue measures almost 1/4-mile (400 m) long and with more than 2 million square feet (190,000 m^{2}) of floor space, more than 20 times the size of the original 1880 building. The museum building is an accretion of over 20 structures, most of which are not visible from the exterior. The City of New York owns the museum building and contributes utilities, heat, and some of the cost of guardianship. The Iris and B. Gerald Cantor Roof Garden is located on the roof near the southwestern corner of the museum. The museum's main building was designated a city landmark by the New York City Landmarks Preservation Commission in 1967, and its interior was separately recognized by the Landmarks Preservation Commission in 1977. The Met's main building was designated a National Historic Landmark in 1986, recognizing both its monumental architecture, and its importance as a cultural institution.

== Management ==
=== Governance ===
Daniel Weiss was the president and CEO of the Met, replacing Emily K. Rafferty, who served as president for a decade, and Thomas P. Campbell, CEO and director of the museum until resigning in 2017. In April 2018, Max Hollein was named director. The Met announced in August 2022 that Hollein would become CEO in July 2023.

==== Board ====
Although the City of New York owns the museum building and contributes utilities, heat, and some of the cost of guardianship, the collections are owned by a private corporation of fellows and benefactors which totals about 950 people. The museum is governed by a board of trustees of 41 elected members, several officials of the City of New York, and persons honored as trustees by the museum. The current co-chairs of the board, Candace Beinecke and Hamilton E. James, were elected in 2021. Other notable trustees include Anna Wintour, Richard Chilton, Candace Beinecke, Alejandro Santo Domingo. The New York City Mayor, City Council speaker, and New York City Comptroller serve as ex officio trustees, who appoint representatives to serve on the board without pay.

The activities of board of trustees are organized and based upon the activities of the individual trustees and their various committees as of 2016. The several committees of the board of trustees include the committees listed as Nominating, Executive, Acquisitions, Finance, Investment, Legal, Education, Audit, Employee Benefits, External Affairs, Merchandising, Membership, Building, Technology, and The Fund for the Met.

=== Finances ===
As of 2021, the museum's endowment as administered by the museum's investment officer Lauren Meserve is US$3.3 billion which provides much of the income for operations while admissions account for only 13 percent of revenue as of fiscal 2016. The 2009–10 operating budget was $221 million (~$322 million in 2025). The museum admission price as of March 2018 is $25 (~$32.00 in 2025) for out-of-state and foreign visitors, while New York state residents can pay what they wish to enter. Although subject to re-assessment, a 1970 agreement between the museum and the city of New York requires New York state visitors to pay at least a nominal amount; a penny is acceptable. The Met's finance committee is led by Hamilton E. James of The Blackstone Group, who is also one of the board members at the Met. The Met is reported to have an Aaa credit rating, the highest such rating possible. This was last affirmed by Moody's in 2015.

In 2019, museum president Daniel Weiss announced that the institution would review its policy for receiving financial donations, under pressure from activist group P.A.I.N. for the role that cultural institutions have played in whitewashing the Sackler family by receiving their donations. The museum announced it would remove the Sackler name from locations within the museum in December 2021.

==== 2015–2018 setbacks ====
In September 2016, The Wall Street Journal first reported financial set-backs at the museum related to servicing its outstanding debts and associated cut-backs in staffing at the museum, with the goal of trying to balance its budget by fiscal year 2018. According to the Met's annual tax filing for fiscal year 2016, several top executives had received disproportionately high compensation, often exceeding $1 million per annum with over $100,000 bonuses per annum.

In April 2017, The New York Times reported that the Met's annual debt was approaching $40 million, in addition to an outstanding museum bond for $250 million. This resulted in the indefinite postponement of a planned $600 million architectural expansion of the exhibition space for the museum's modern art collection as well as started a general discussion over the Met's human resources management. The chairman of the board at the Met elected in 2011, Daniel Brodsky, stated in response to the Times reports that he "looked forward to working with my administrative and board colleagues to support a climate of candor, transparency, accountability and mutual respect". In January 2018, Daniel Weiss as president of the museum stated that a downsized version of the original $600 million architectural expansion might be reconsidered as early as 2020 at a reduction to the $450 million level.

Brodsky, the chairman of the Met, stated that after the 2017 financial setbacks, the director position would be appointed separately from the position of CEO. Following a commissioned report from the Boston Consulting Group, the interim CEO, president, and COO of the Met, Daniel Weiss, said that the Met's 2015–2017 financial setbacks were caused by "slowing revenue, rising costs, and too many projects at once". Weiss was further reported as having hired Will Manzer, formerly an executive at Perry Ellis, to help re-invigorate recently declining revenues at the museum. On April 26, Weiss stated that the budget shortfall of $15 million might require a re-assessment and increase in the museum's current admission payment policy. Weiss added that there remained concerns for a sustainable fiscal model for the Met in which city officials "have a right to a clear understanding of how we would be engaging the public, how we balance access with sustainability". In May 2017, the Met filed formal proposal to attempt to charge admission fees to out-of-state visitors. Robin Pogrebin, writing for the Times, reported that the request for out-of-state admissions would call for the re-legislation of the New York State 1893 Act which requires that the museum's collections "shall be kept open and accessible to the public free of all charge throughout the year", and any unlegislated changes would be subject to challenge by the New York State attorney general, Eric Schneiderman, or one of the tristate counselors, Christopher Porrino or George Jepsen.

In January 2018, Pogrebin writing for The New York Times reported that amid-continuing reverberations from "a period of financial turbulence and leadership turmoil" that the museum president Daniel Weiss had announced that the museum would rescind its century-old policy of free admission to the museum and begin charging $25 for out-of-state visitors starting in March 2018. Pogrebin stated that although the museum had made progress in decreasing its deficit from $40 million to $10 million, that an adverse decision from the City of New York to curtail funding for the Met's operating costs by as much as $8 million "for security and building staff" caused Weiss to announce the change in admissions policy. Weiss indicated that the new policy would be estimated to increase revenue from the current $43 million it receives from admissions to an enhanced revenue stream as high as US$49 million.

=== Attendance ===
For the fiscal year 2017 which ended on June 30, the museum was reported as having 7 million visitors during the past year, where "37 percent of these were international visitors, while 30 percent came from New York's five boroughs." Previously in 2016, the museum set a record for attendance, attracting 6.7 million visitors—the highest number since the museum began tracking admissions. Forty percent of the Met's visitors in fiscal year 2016 came from New York City and the tristate area; 41 percent from 190 countries besides the United States. In 2017, the attendance figures indicated seven million annual visitors with 63% of the visitors arriving from outside of New York State.

Roberta Smith writing for The New York Times in September 2017 voiced growing public concern that proposed increases in admissions costs would have an adverse effect upon attendance statistics at the museum. Smith referred to the public perception that such costs would appear "greedy and inappropriate" because "The museum already gets around $39 million a year from its gate—equal to the entire annual budget of the Brooklyn Museum." Smith's article continued to report the negative response of local communities in the tristate area surrounding the museum which was previously introduced in a series of articles by Robin Pogrebin written during the 2016–2017 fiscal year at the museum which criticized speculative suggestions among current administrators at the museum that an added revenue stream could be pursued by the museum by rescinding existing museum policy since 1893 allowing for free public access to the museum. In January 2018, museum president Daniel Weiss announced that the century-old policy of free museum admission would be replaced. Effective March 2018, most visitors who do not live in New York state or are not a student from New York, New Jersey, or Connecticut have to pay $25 (~$32.00 in 2025) to enter the museum. The City of New York has reduced funding at the Metropolitan as part of Mayor De Blasio's political effort to increase artistic diversity. They made an agreement to allow the fees in exchange for less funding which the city pledged to use at alternate facilities and promote diversity.

Holland Carter and Roberta Smith of The New York Times argued in response to Weiss's decision to rescind the previous free admission policy as lacking in responsible fiscal planning. They stated that a recent $65 million expenditure for renovating fountains seemed to be a poor allocation of the limited available funding. Smith added, "Those new awful Darth Vaderish fountains take huge hunks out of the plaza and disrupt movement" as an indication of the misuse of funds. Further criticism of Weiss's proposal was voiced internationally when The Guardian summarized the backlash from the Weiss proposal for raising the admissions fees. It stated, "Some critics are outraged. The past week has seen a New York Times piece titled "The New Pay Policy Is a Mistake", while Jezebel's Aimée Lutkin claimed "The Met Should Be Fucking Free". The New York Post writes that the museum has never had the right to charge admission and Alexandra Schwartz in the New Yorker says the new policy diminishes New York City".

=== Impact of the COVID-19 pandemic (2020–2021) ===
In early 2020, the COVID-19 pandemic greatly impacted the Met's operations and led to the museum's first long-term shutdown on March 13. The Met gradually partially reopened in stages. By 2021, the public could visit the Met five days a week, with reduced hours of operation, and visitors were required to wear masks and practice social distancing. Several special exhibits were opened to the public during the reduced hours. There were 6,479,548 visitors in 2019, compared to 1,124,759 in 2020. However, in 2021, the museum attracted 1,958,000 visitors, ranking fourth on the list of most-visited art museums in the world.

Other services such as the research libraries were almost completely closed except for off-site digital access. As a result, 20 percent of staff positions were eliminated, and Met director Max Hollein indicated that the Met might deaccession and sell off some of its collection to make up financial shortfalls. At least some of the museum's large art holding was placed in storage in order to make-up for losses in revenue causes by responses to the pandemic.

== Deaccessioning works of art ==
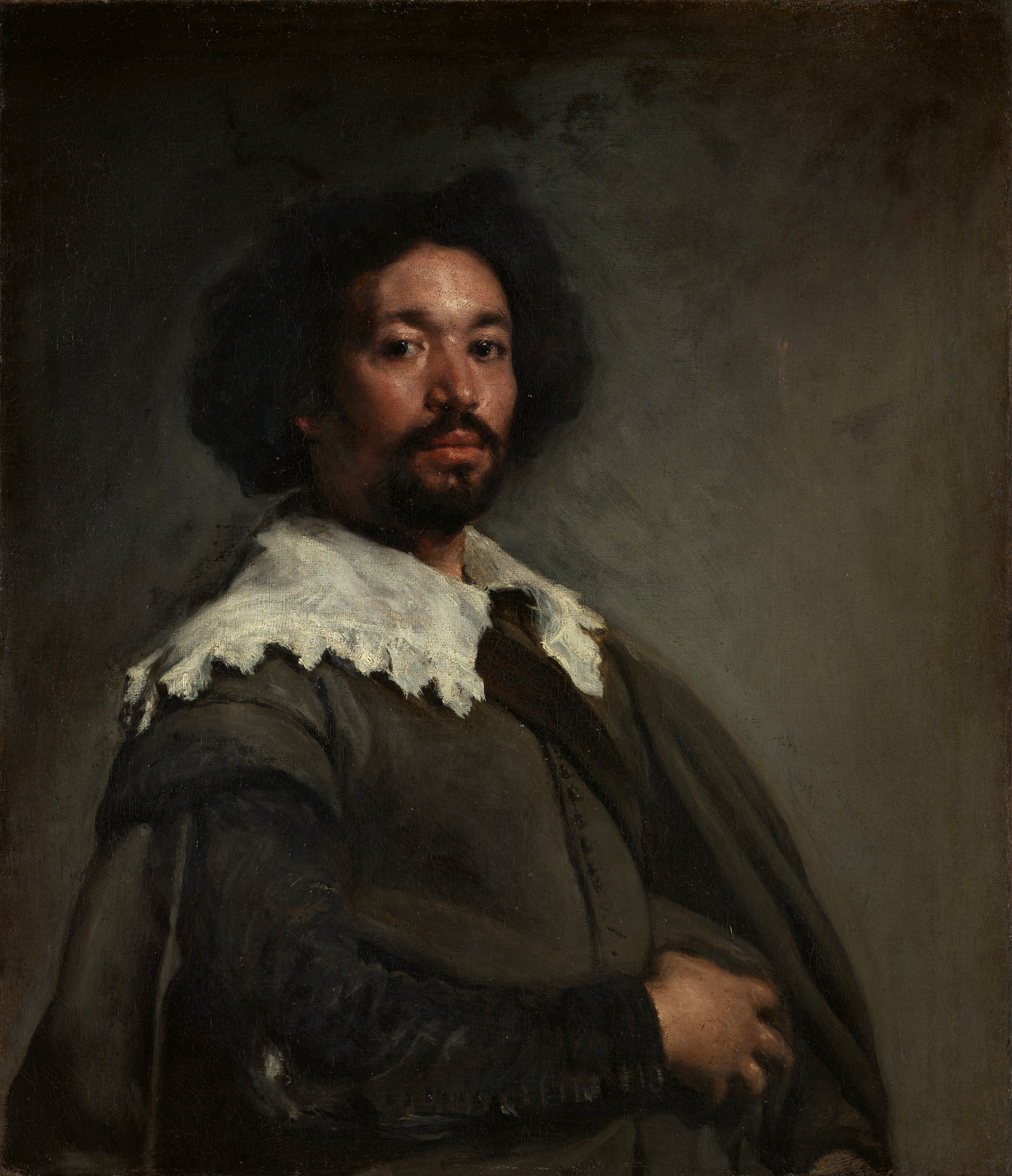
Diego Velázquez, Portrait of Juan de Pareja, 1650

The Met has always deaccessioned works to improve the collection by using the proceeds to purchase better or more appropriate works. As noted above, it has deaccessioned nearly two-thirds of the founding purchase of Old Master paintings made in 1871. As early as 1887, it sold 5,000 Cypriot objects in order to purchase Egyptian antiquities, and over the years it sold many thousands more works from Cyprus. 15,000 Egyptian objects were sold in the museum's shop in 1955, and nearly 10,000 works from other departments were earmarked that year for sale at auction.

The Metropolitan Museum of Art spent $39 million to acquire art for the fiscal year ending in June 2012. In 2020, it spent $29,824,000 (with $6,747,000 coming from insurance and the sale of art). In 2021, it spent $36,402,000 (with $4,007,000 coming from insurance and the sale of art). In 2022, it spent $74,432,000 (with $9,488,000 coming from insurance and the sale of art); in 2023 it spent $52,401,000 (with $7,444,000 coming from insurance and the sale of art).

In the early 1970s, under the directorship of Thomas Hoving, the Met revised its deaccessioning policy. It sought to acquire "world-class" pieces, including through the sale of mid- to high-value items from its collection. Though the Met had always sold duplicate or minor items from its collection to fund the acquisition of new pieces, the Met's new policy allowed the sale of important items with high values, objects regarded as part of the museum's core collection. Hoving's deaccessioning practices, including secretive non-public sales that violated donor wishes, was exposed by John L. Hess in a series of articles in the New York Times. These exposés provoked widespread criticism when they came to light, and they were compounded by deceitful and misleading statements made by Hoving, who was censured by the College Art Association and the Art Dealers Association of America. This resulted in an investigation of the museum by the New York State Attorney General Louis J. Lefkowitz, who held public hearings in 1972. As a result of these hearings, the museum agreed to list in its annual report the total cash proceeds from art sales each year, and to itemize any deaccessioned objects valued at more than $50,000 each. It also agreed to sell those pieces at public auction and provide advance public notice of a work being sold if it had been on view in the last ten years. Known as the "Hoving Affair", the deaccessioning scandal has been written about by Calvin Tomkins, in Merchants and Masterpieces (1970; rev. ed. 1989), Michael Gross in Rogues' Gallery (2009), and Martin Gammon, Deaccessioning and its Discontents: A Critical History (2018), though the most comprehensive account remains Hess's 1974 book, The Grand Acquisitors.

Two of the objects purchased with funds generated by Hoving's deaccessions were highlights of the Met's collection. Diego Velázquez's 1650 Portrait of Juan de Pareja (bought in part through deaccessioned works) and a classical Greek vase, the Euphronios Krater, which depicted the death of Sarpedon (funded by the sale of the museum's classical coin collection). The latter, which proved to be looted, was repatriated to Italy in 2006. The Met has sold such valuable pieces as Edward Steichen's 1904 photograph The Pond-Moonlight (which it regarded as a duplicate, since another copy was already in the Met's collection) for a record price of $2.9 million.

Hoving was criticized for selling important works from the museum to fund his acquisitions, including a Henri Rousseau and a Van Gogh, and he planned to sell many more, including 14 Monet paintings he characterized as "routine". During the tenure of director Philippe de Montebello, the sale of a single Monet (together with the construction of purpose-built galleries) eventually led to the acquisition of two collections totaling 220 paintings, which established the museum's remarkable plein-air paintings collection.

Another deaccessioning controversy broke out in 2021, when the Association of Art Museum Directors temporarily relaxed its guidelines due to hardships suffered by museums during the COVID pandemic. Previously, funds from deaccessioned works were only to be used to purchase other works for the permanent collection. The temporary guidelines, however, permitted these monies to be used for the "care" of the collection. The Met decided to use funds from deaccessions for collection care (to pay salaries). It was roundly criticized for this decision by the Met's former director Thomas P. Campbell (Montebello's successor), by cultural critic Lee Rosenbaum, and by Pulitzer Prize winning journalist Christopher Knight, among others. They argued that the practice set a bad example for other museums and that the Met did not truly need these monies.

== Looted art ==
One of the most serious and daunting challenges to the Metropolitan Museum's respectable reputation has been a series of allegations and lawsuits about its known status as an institutional buyer of looted and stolen antiquities. Since the 1990s the Met has been the subject of countless investigative reports and books critical of the Met's laissez-faire attitude to acquisition. The Met has lost several major lawsuits, notably against the governments of Italy and Turkey, which successfully sought the repatriation of hundreds of ancient Mediterranean and Middle Eastern antiquities, with a total value in the hundreds of millions of dollars. In August 2022, it was reported that the Cambodian government was pressuring the museum to return Khmer artifacts that were allegedly looted during the civil war and the tumultuous period following. In September 2022, New York law enforcement, across three separate search warrants, seized 27 artifacts highlighting ancient Rome, Greece, and Egypt, with the intention of returning them to Italy and Egypt. These 27 objects were worth an aggregate total of $13 million. The items were seized due to their discovered link to known antiquities traffickers. This comes along with an international recalculation of what belongs in the museums of the world. Similar cases of repatriation conversations include the Elgin Marbles, the Benin Bronzes, and El Penacho. Along with the conversation about returning art, the art community is calling upon museological institutions to hold themselves to a higher standard of Social Justice, equity, and ethics. On March 22, 2023, Manhattan prosecutors seized 15 allegedly stolen antiquities tied to Subhash Kapoor. In December 2023, the museum announced it will return 14 Khmer sculptures to Cambodia and 2 to Thailand after determining they were stolen and linked to art dealer Douglas Latchford.

=== Looted Indigenous American art and NAGPRA violations ===
Since 1993, Charles and Valerie Diker have donated 139 Indigenous objects to the museum, many of which are funerary. Most of these objects have ownership histories with 200–2,000 year gaps in known owners. The display of Native American funerary objects is problematic, not just because of its unethical spotlighting of private ceremonial objects, but also due to its violation of NAGPRA. NAGPRA, the Native American Graves Protection and Repatriation Act, established in 1990, states that institutions that receive federal funding must work to repatriate Native American human remains, funerary objects, and other ceremonially important objects. This was done to ensure that the respect and dignity deserved by all humans was given to Native Americans. Part of the goal of enacting NAGPRA was to begin a dialogue between American museum institutions and Indigenous groups. Written into NAGPRA is an acknowledgement of museums as the preservers of history. The Met has been able to avoid the repatriation of valuable objects that fall under the grasp of NAGPRA because they have not formally owned them. Objects that are on permanent or semi-permanent loan to a museum do not legally necessitate the initiation of the repatriation process. As the Diker collection is slowly incorporated into the Met's permanent collection, the objects will become illegal possessions, as the Met is a publicly funded institution.

In April 2023, ProPublica published a report detailing the Indigenous American collections of the Met Museum. The report exposed the loophole of loan vs. own that the Met was using to retain objects that they had an ethical and legal responsibility to repatriate. The report came to the conclusion that the Native American art held by the Met could only have come into the possession of the Diker's through violence, looting, and dispossession. Additionally, the report exposed that only 15% of the 193 objects donated to the Met by the Diker collection have known provenance. In response to the report and earlier claims, the Met claimed that they were in contact with tribal governments about creating appropriate displays of Native American art and funerary objects, but did not specify which tribes.

=== Head of a Griffin ===
In February 2025, the Metropolitan Museum of Art in New York announced the return of a 2,700-year-old bronze griffin head to Greece. The artifact, dating to the 7th century B.C., had been in the museum's collection since 1950. An internal investigation, prompted by new information from Greek authorities and independent researchers, confirmed that the piece had been looted from an archaeological site before reaching the museum through a private collector.

==== Collecting practices ====
In response to many controversies, the museum issued a statement on collecting practices. The statement encompasses all 1.5 million works of art held by the Met. Referencing research, transparency, and collaboration, this statement is a clear redefining of the Met's outlook on looted art and artwork with unknown histories. "As a pre-eminent voice in the global art community, it is incumbent upon the Met to engage more intensively and proactively in examining certain areas of our collection," stated Max Hollein, the director of the museum. The Met hired a manager of provenance research with a team of three staff to assist the already-employed curators and historians.

== Selected objects ==
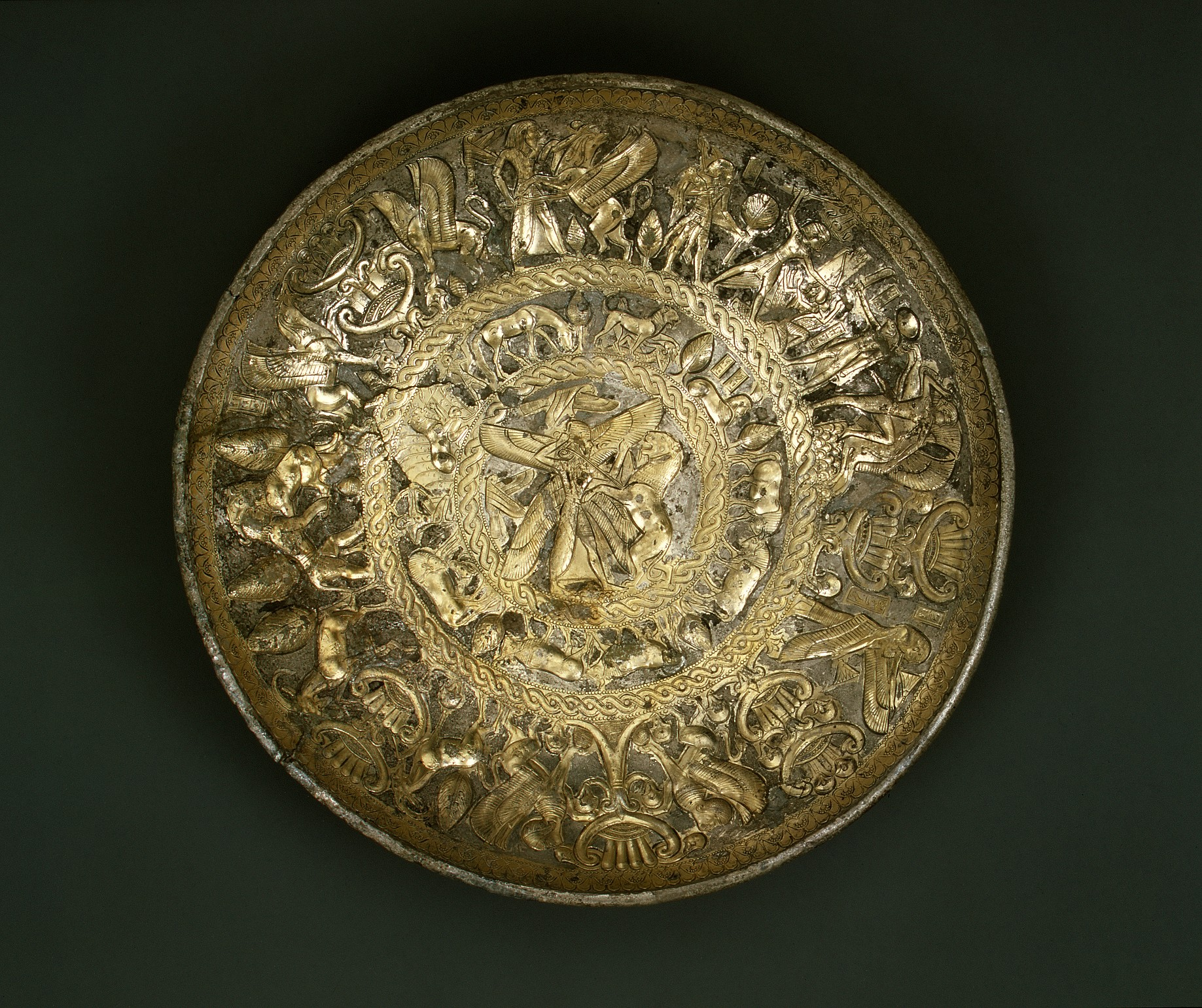
Phoenician metal bowl from 725 to 675 BCE

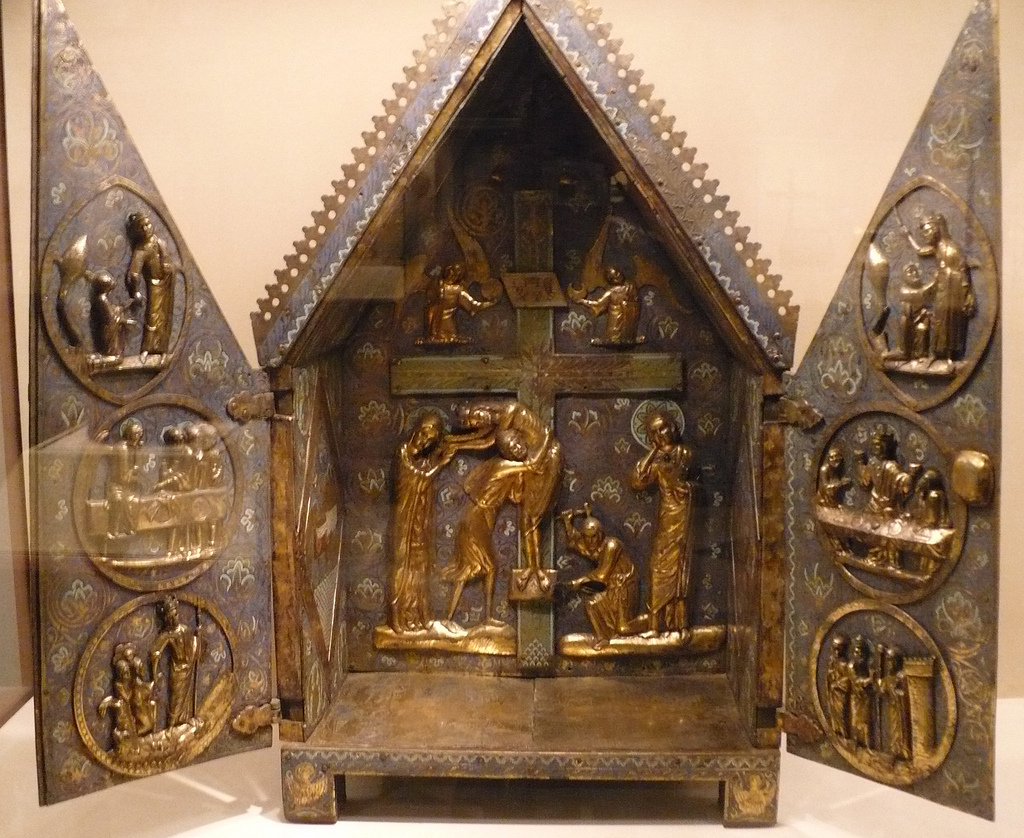
Tabernacle of Cherves, c. 1220–30

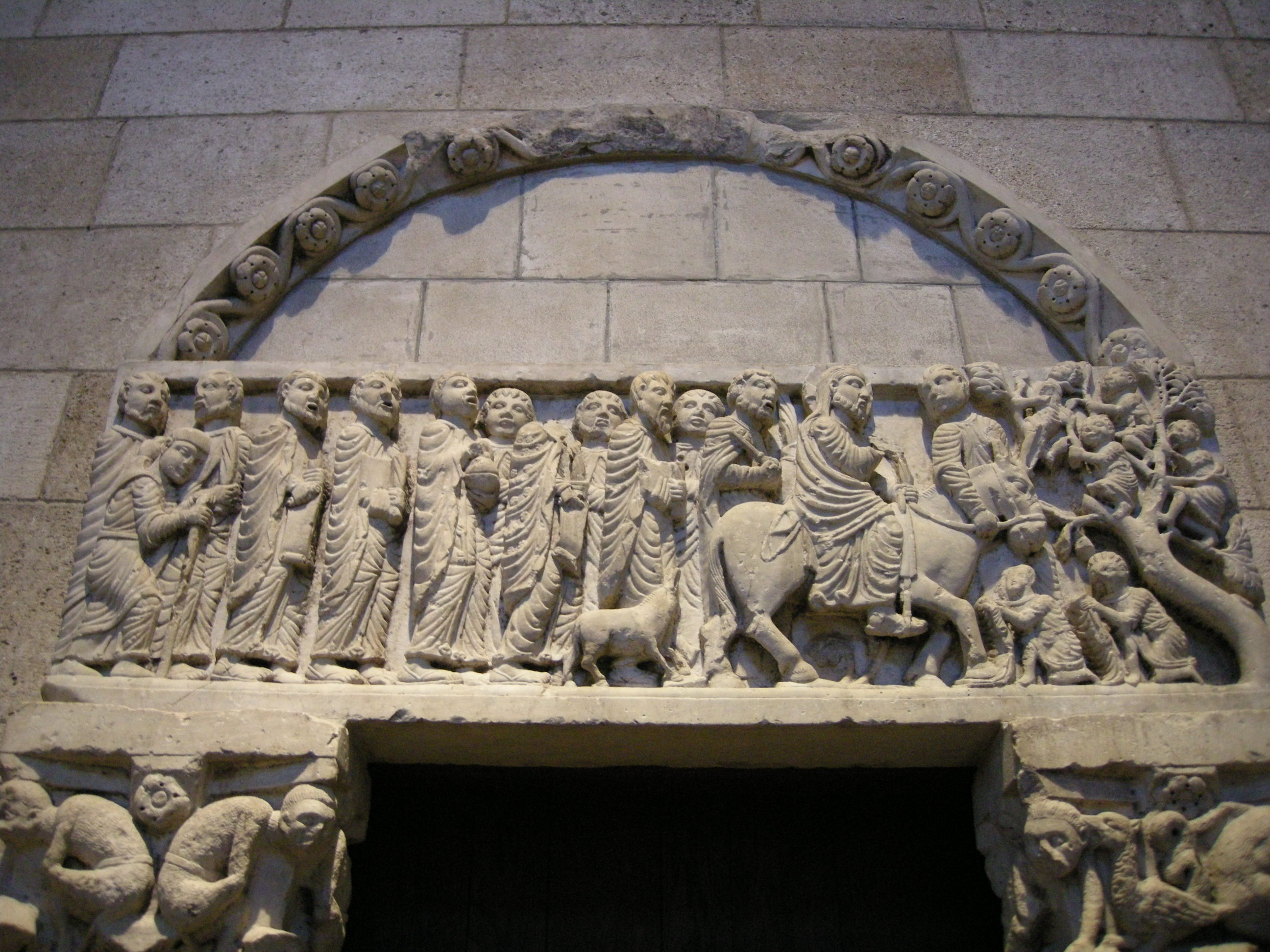
Workshop of Biduinus, portal from the Church of San Leonardo al Frigido in Massa, c. 1170–80

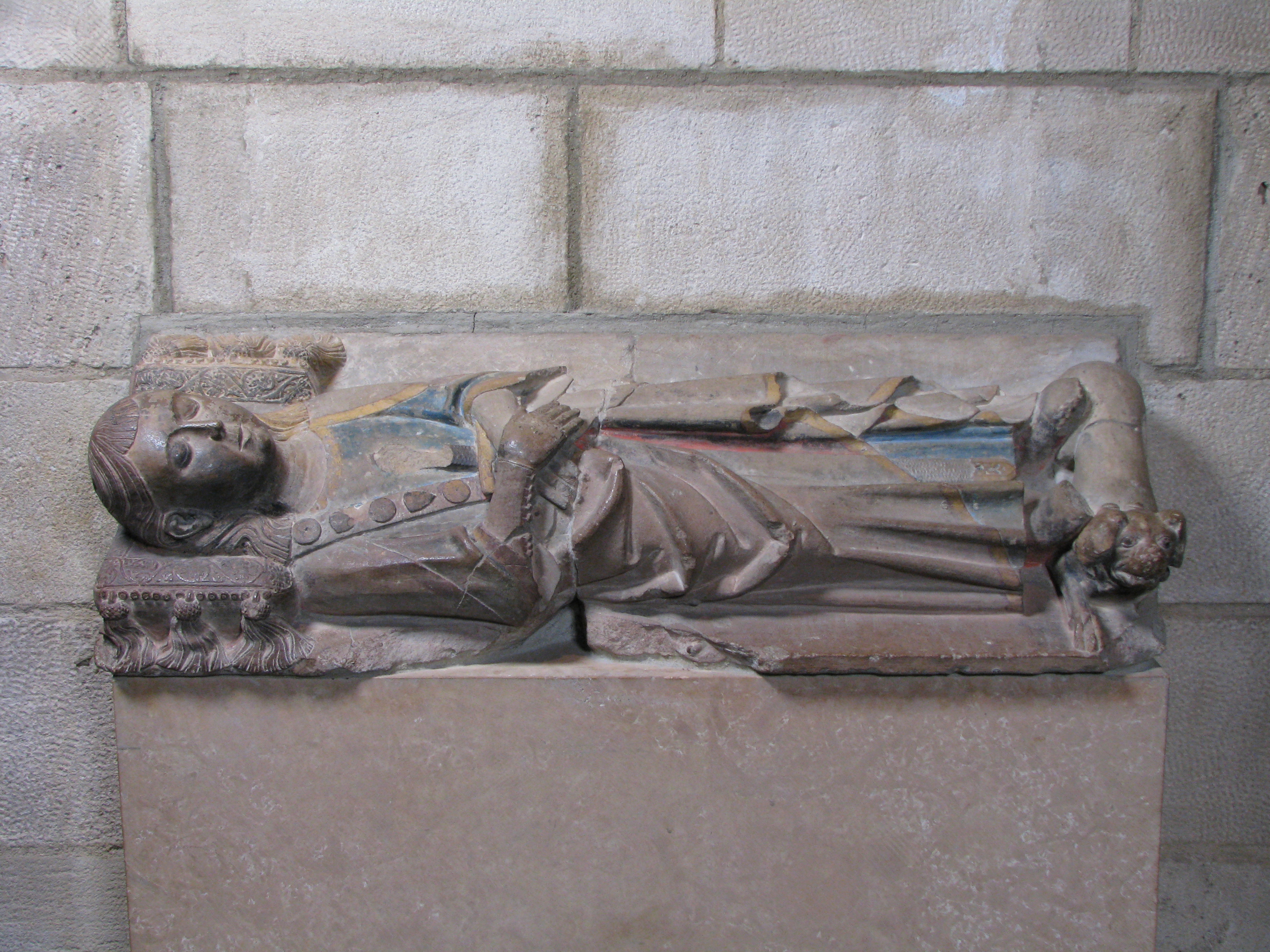
Tomb of Ermengol IX of Urgell (died 1243)

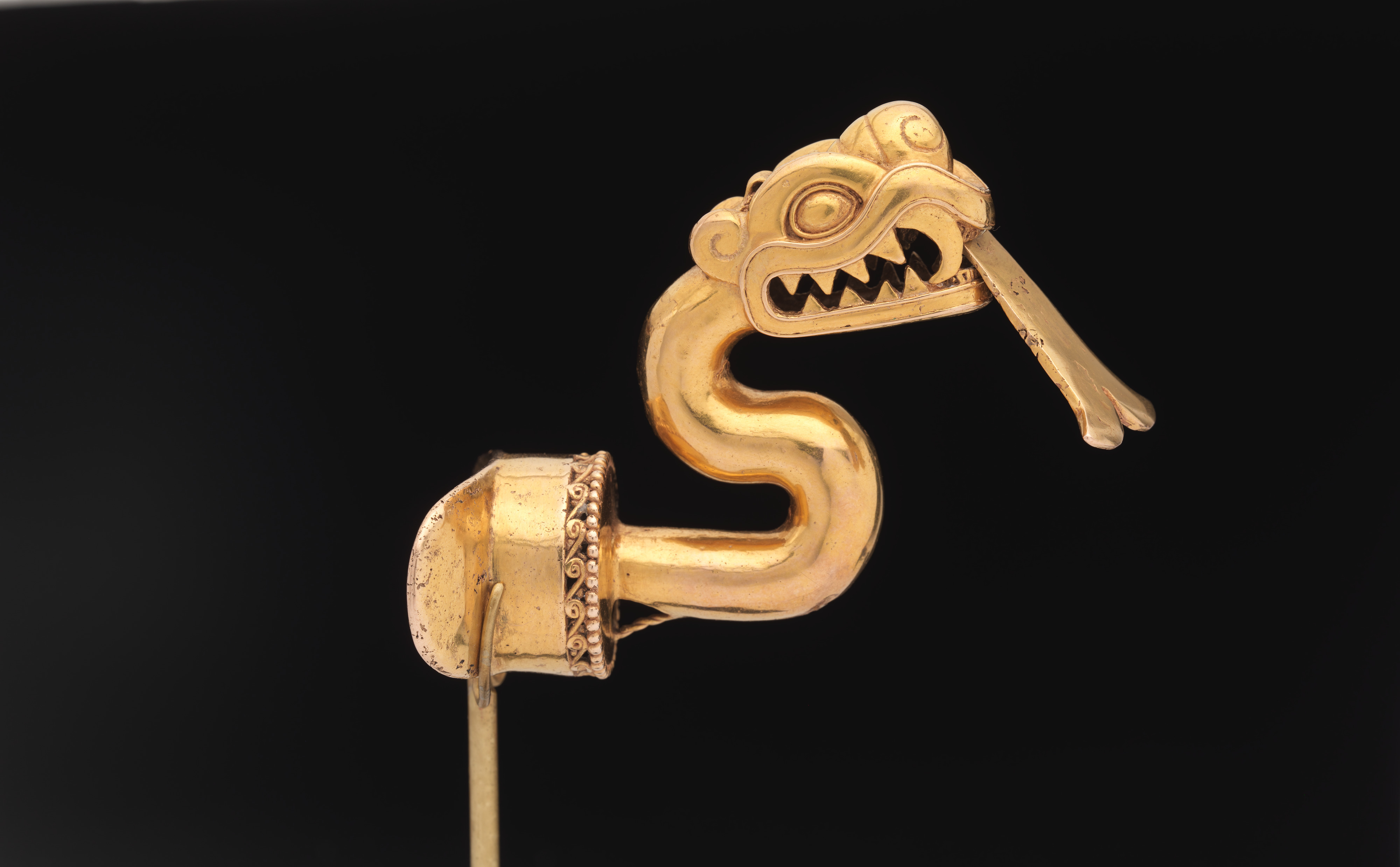
Serpent labret with articulated tongue, c. 1300–1521, Aztec

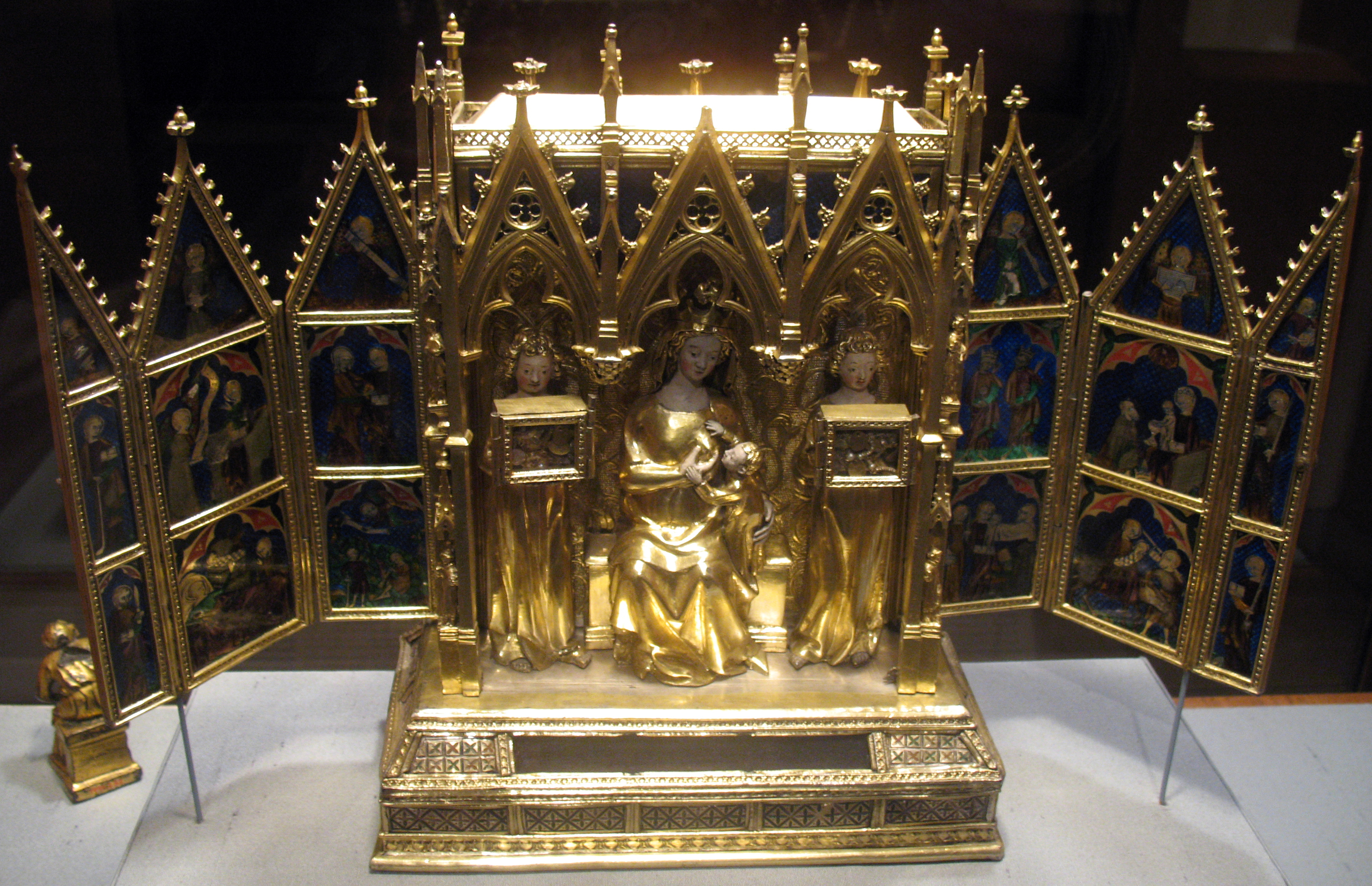
Attributed to Jean de Touyl (French, died 1349), Reliquary Shrine from the convent of the Poor Clares at Buda

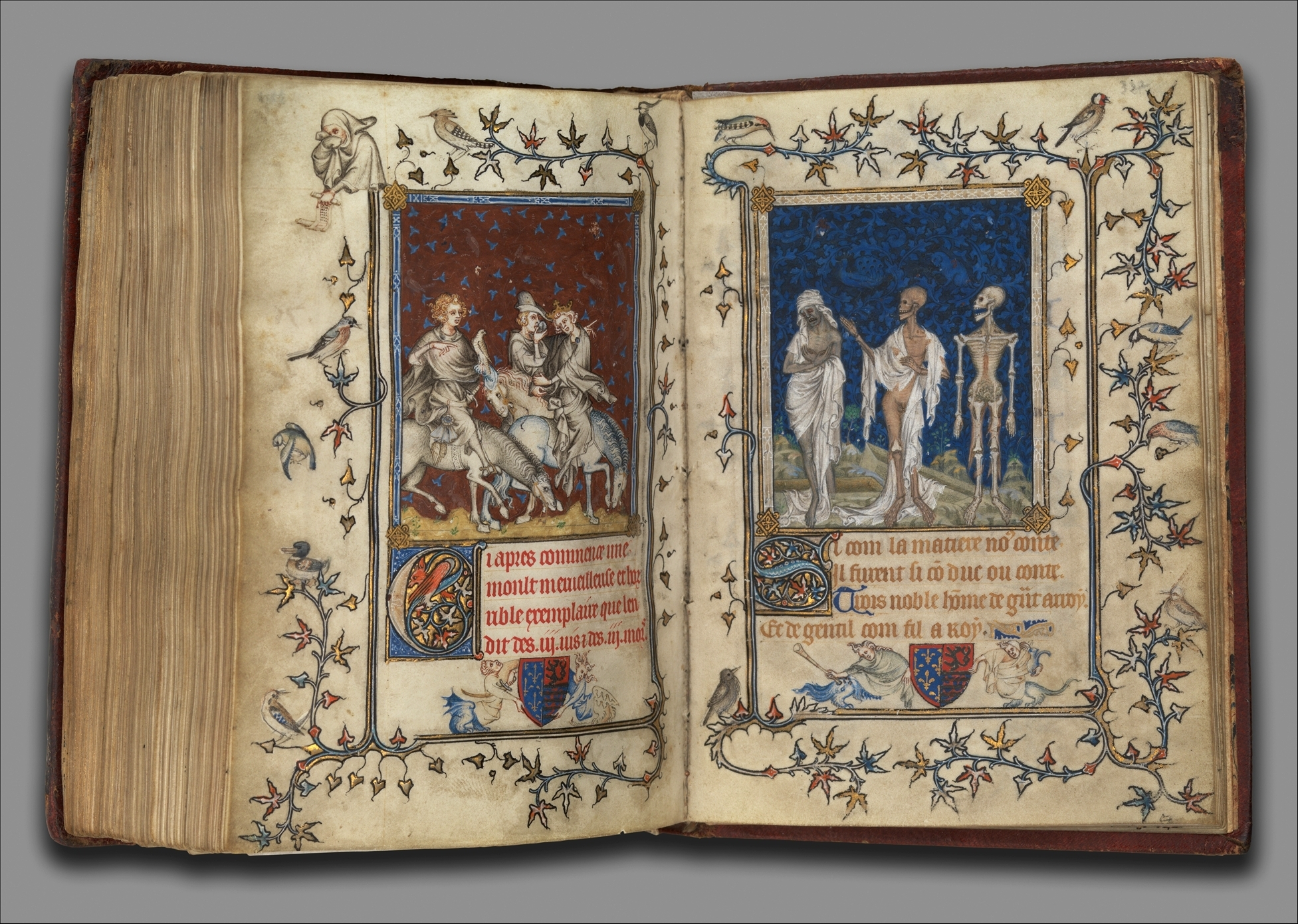
Attributed to Jean Le Noir, Psalter of Bonne de Luxembourg, 14th cen. illuminated manuscript

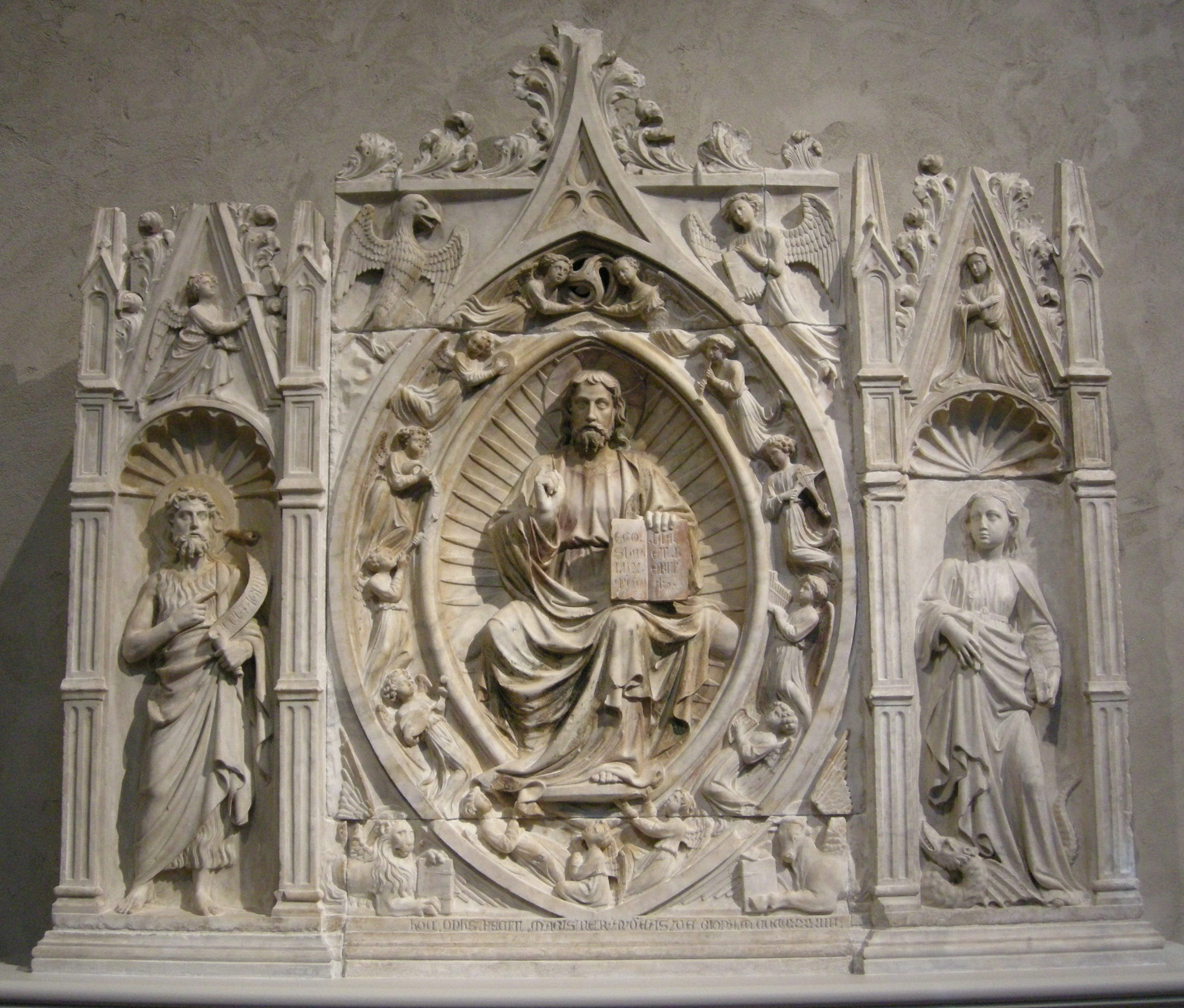
Andrea da Giona, Altarpiece with Christ in Majesty, c. 1434

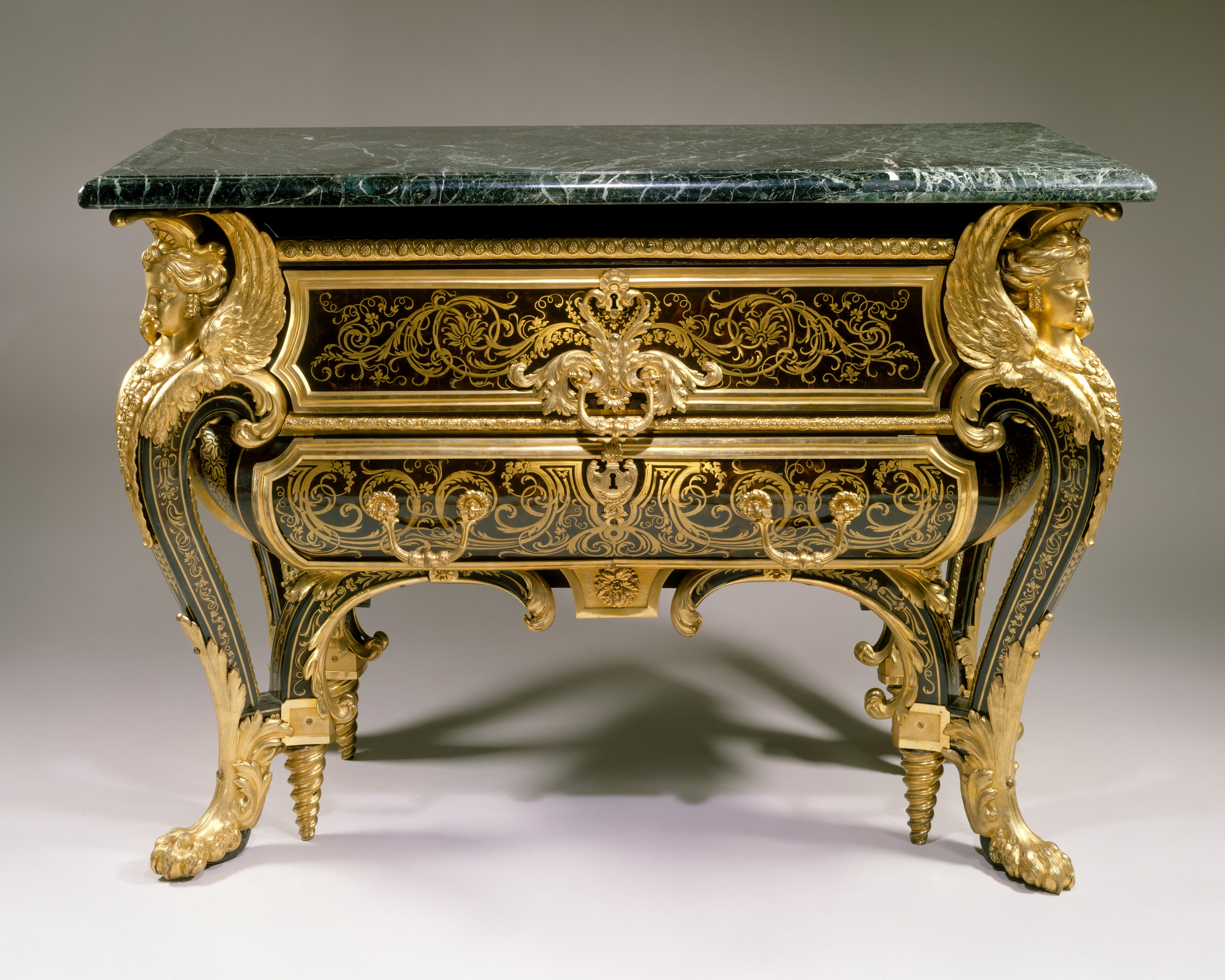
Andre-Charles Boulle (1642–1732) – Commode

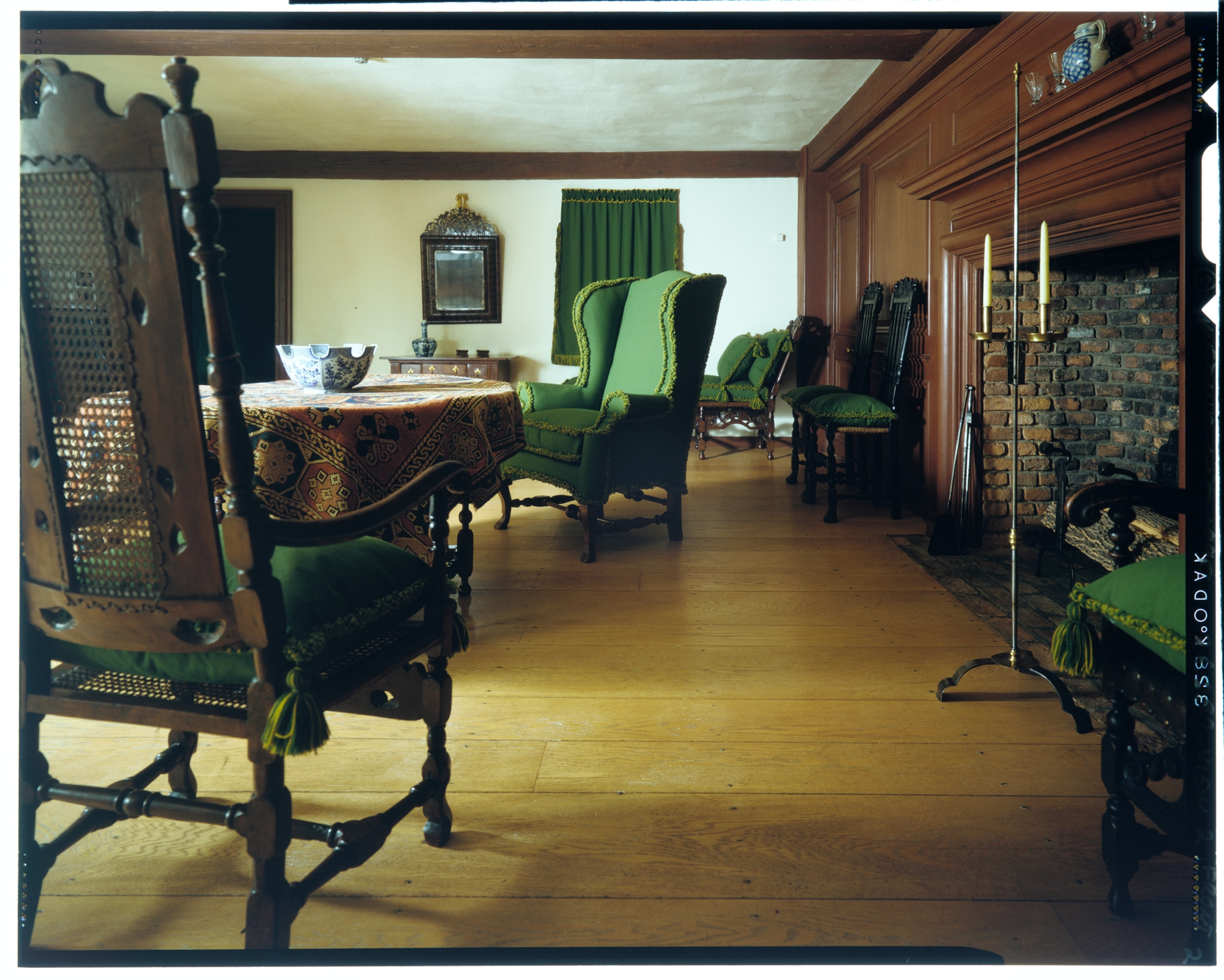
Interior of the early colonial home of John Wentworth, lieutenant governor of New Hampshire
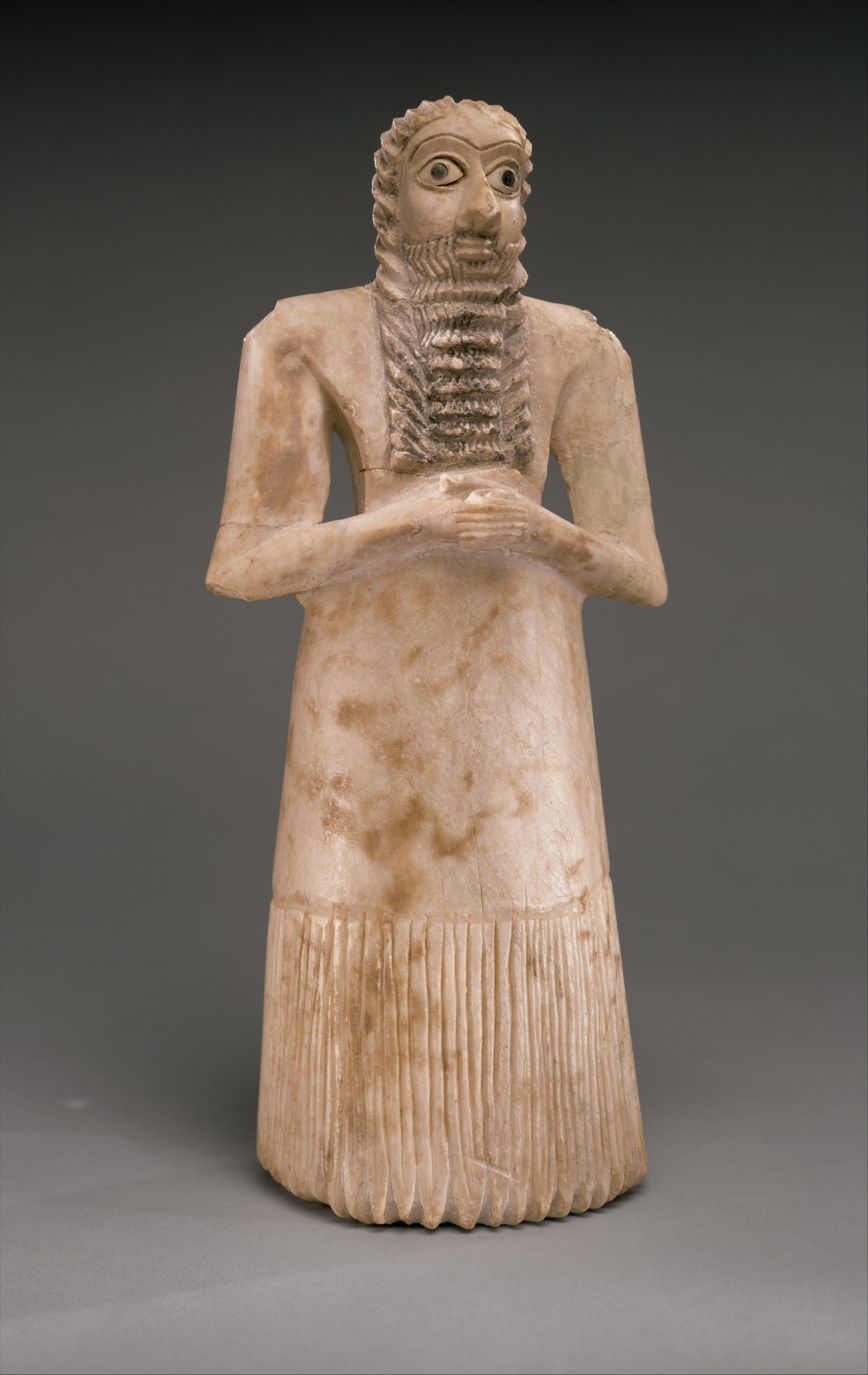
Standing male worshiper, Mesopotamian, 2750–2600 BCE(?)

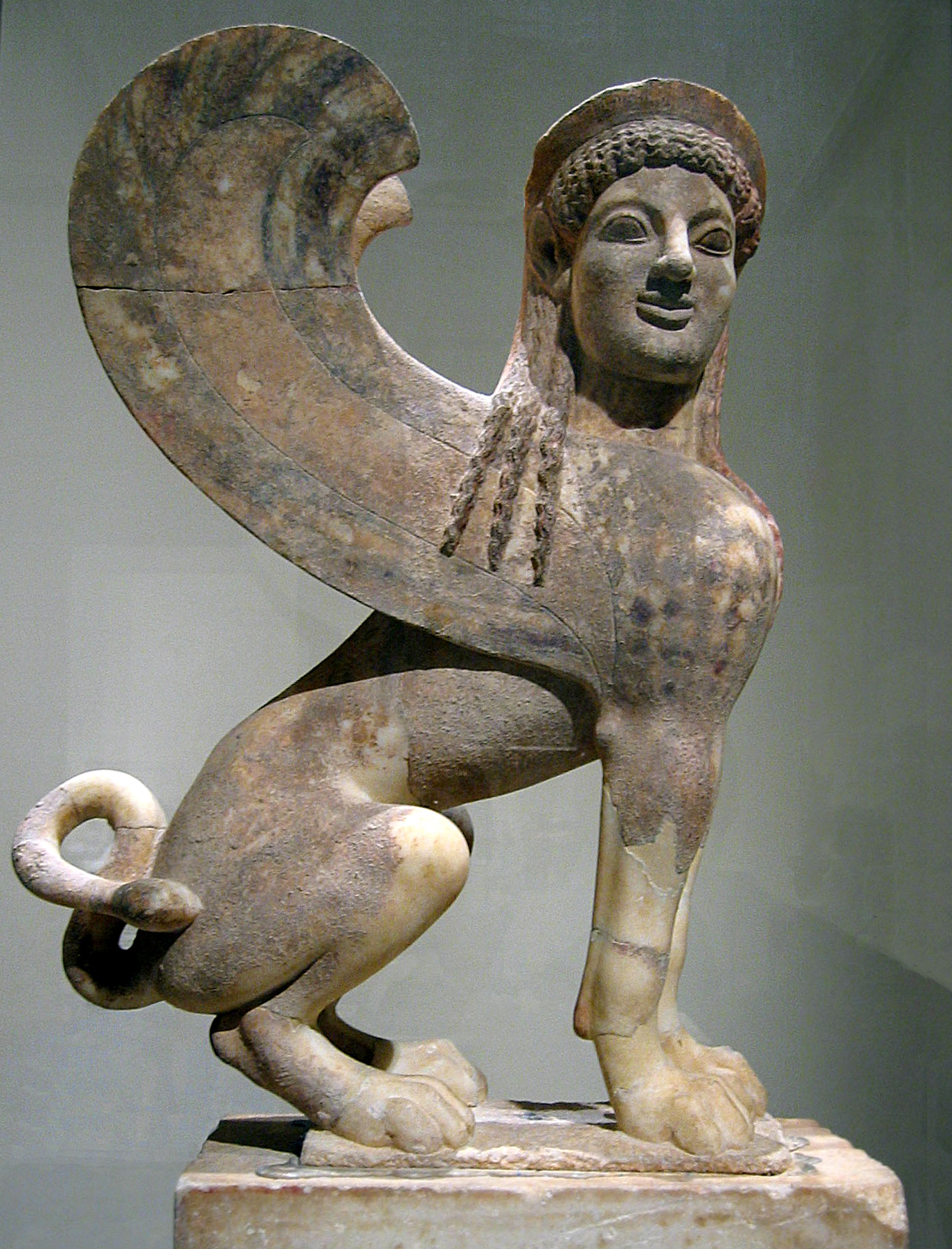
Sphinx, Greece, c. 530 BCE

Busto de Anicia Iuliana, Roman

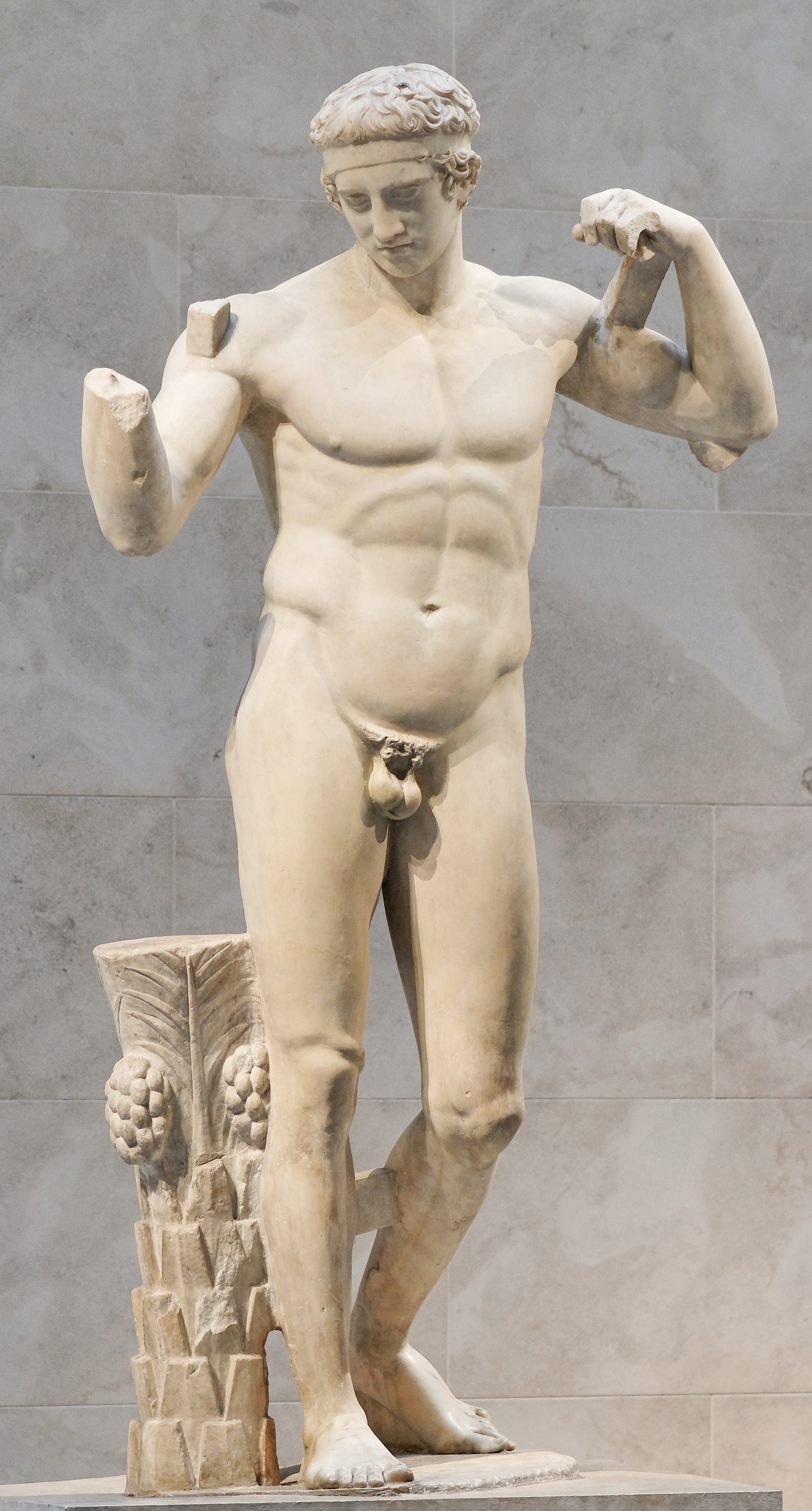
Roman, c. 430

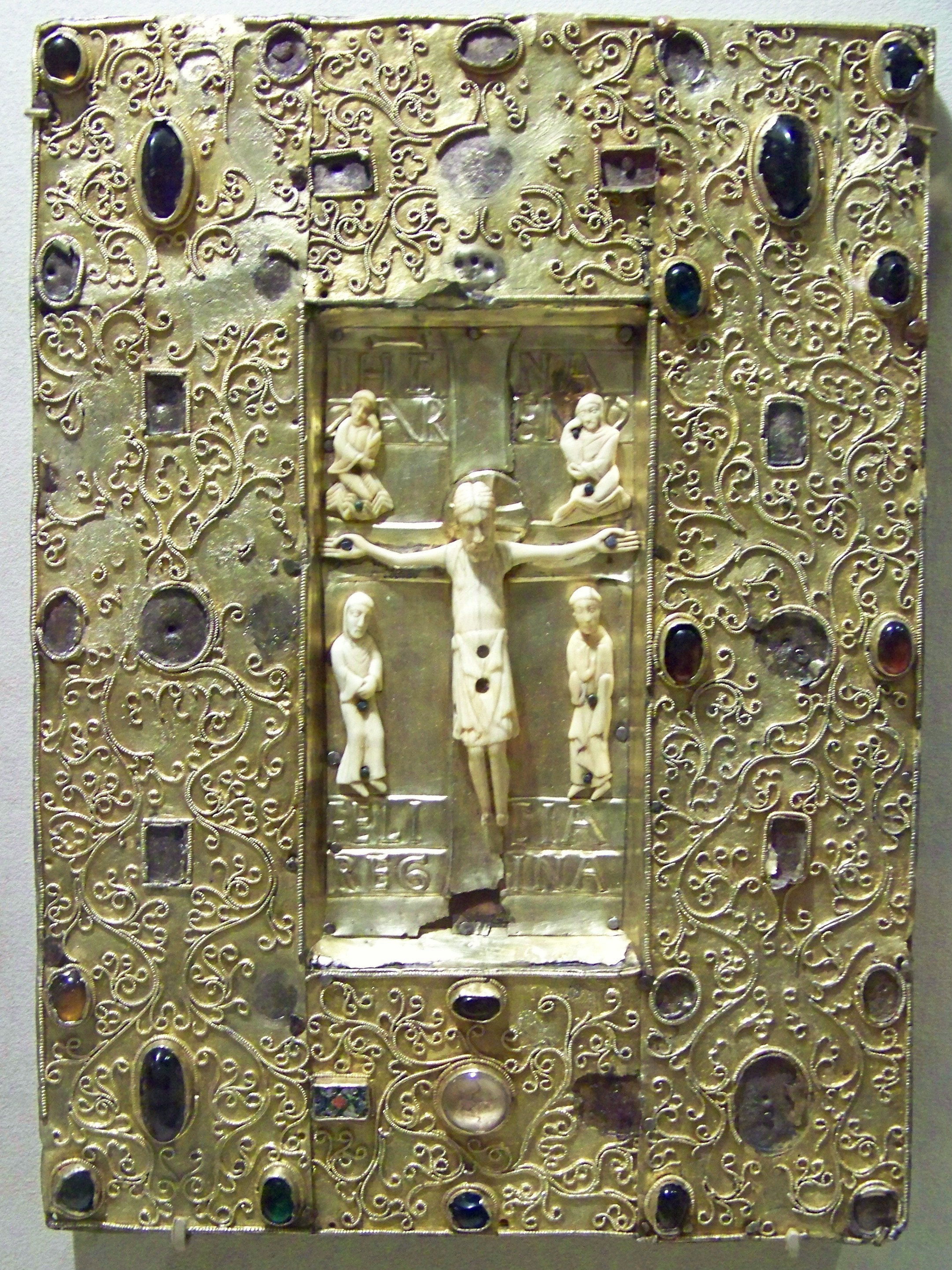
Book Cover with Byzantine Icon of the Crucifixion, before 1085

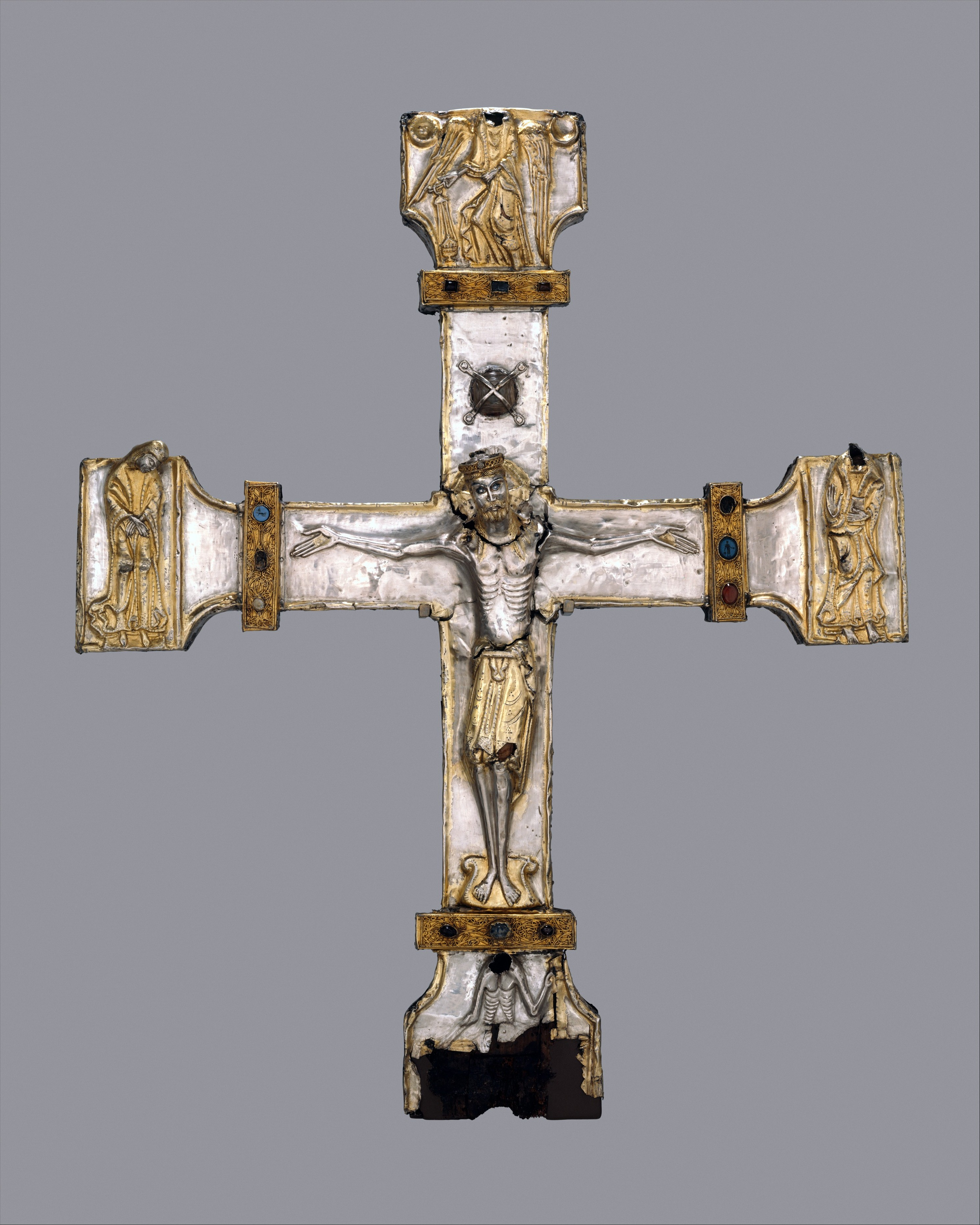
Cross of San Salvador de Fuentes, late 11th – early 12th century, Asturias, Spain

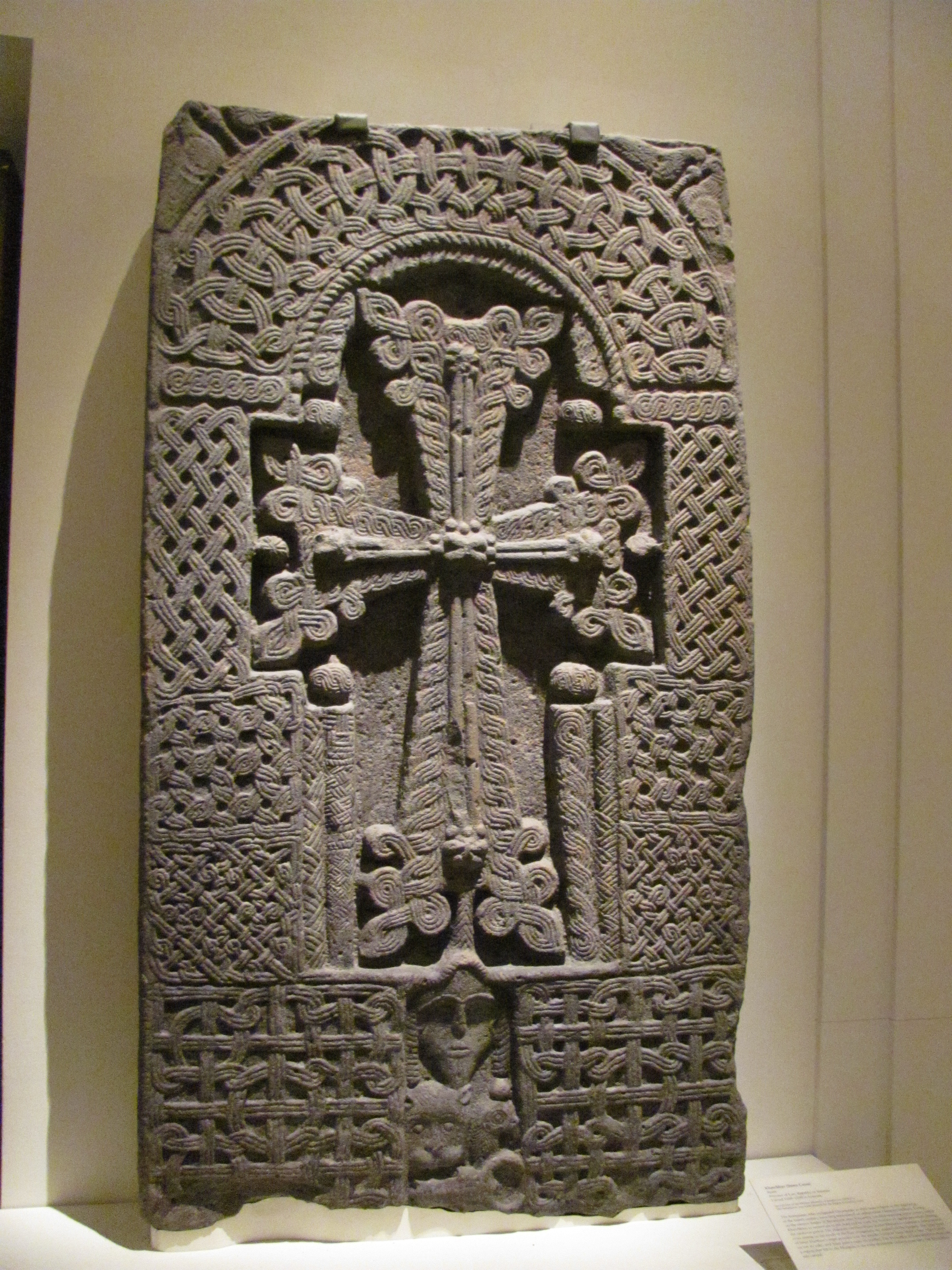
12th-century Khatchkar, Lori Province, Armenia

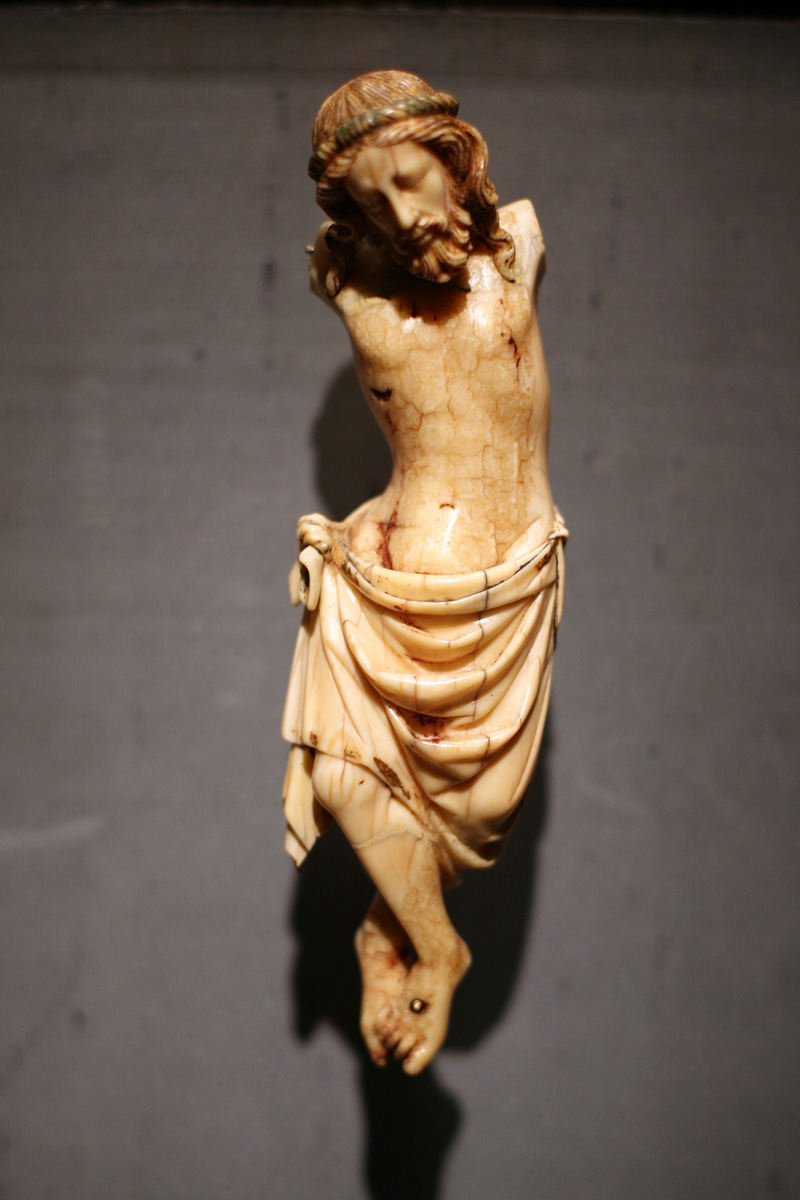
The Crucified Christ, c. 1300, Northern Europe

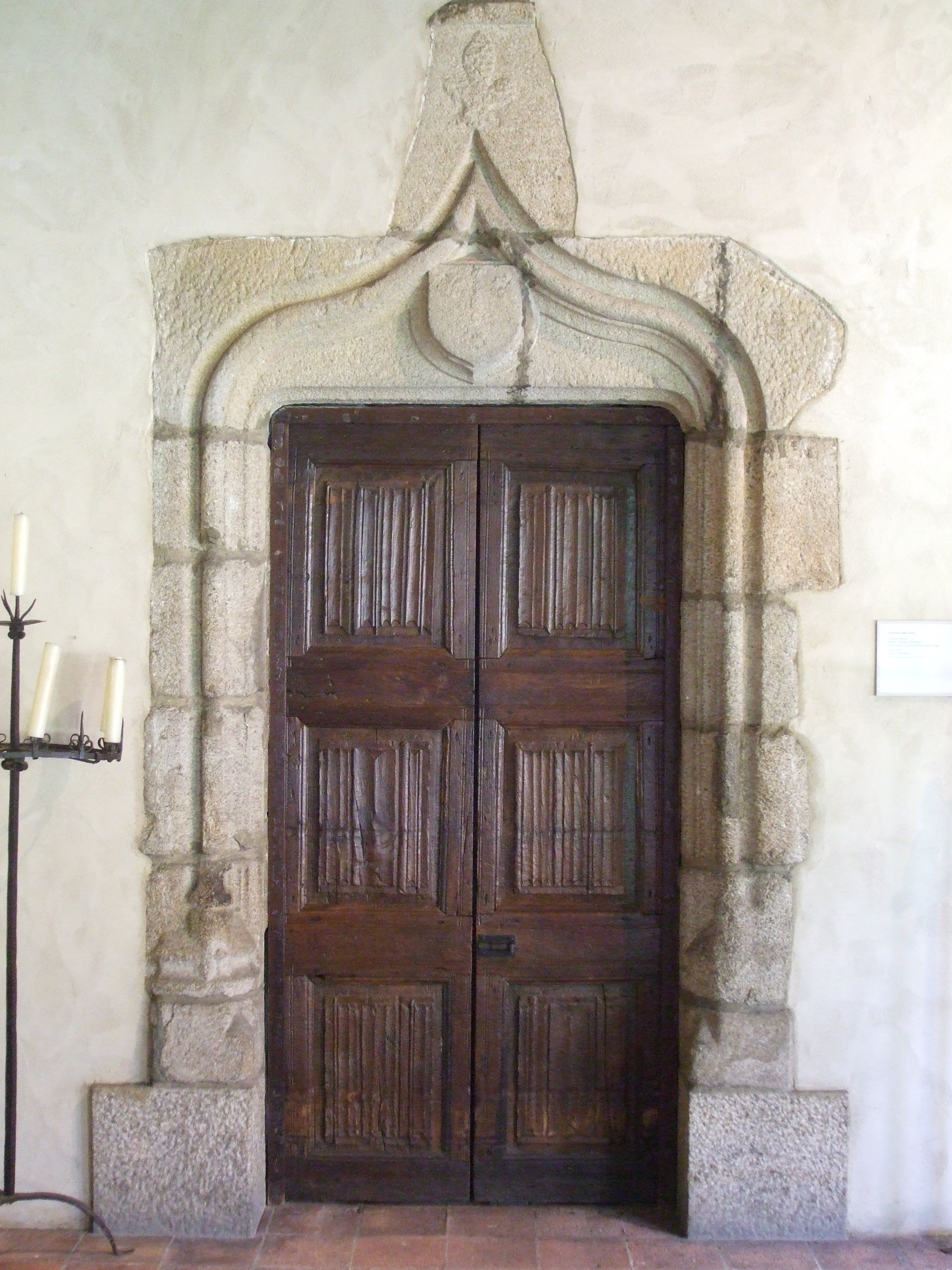
Doorway in granite, in oak, France, Limousin, 15th c., Aixe sur Vienne

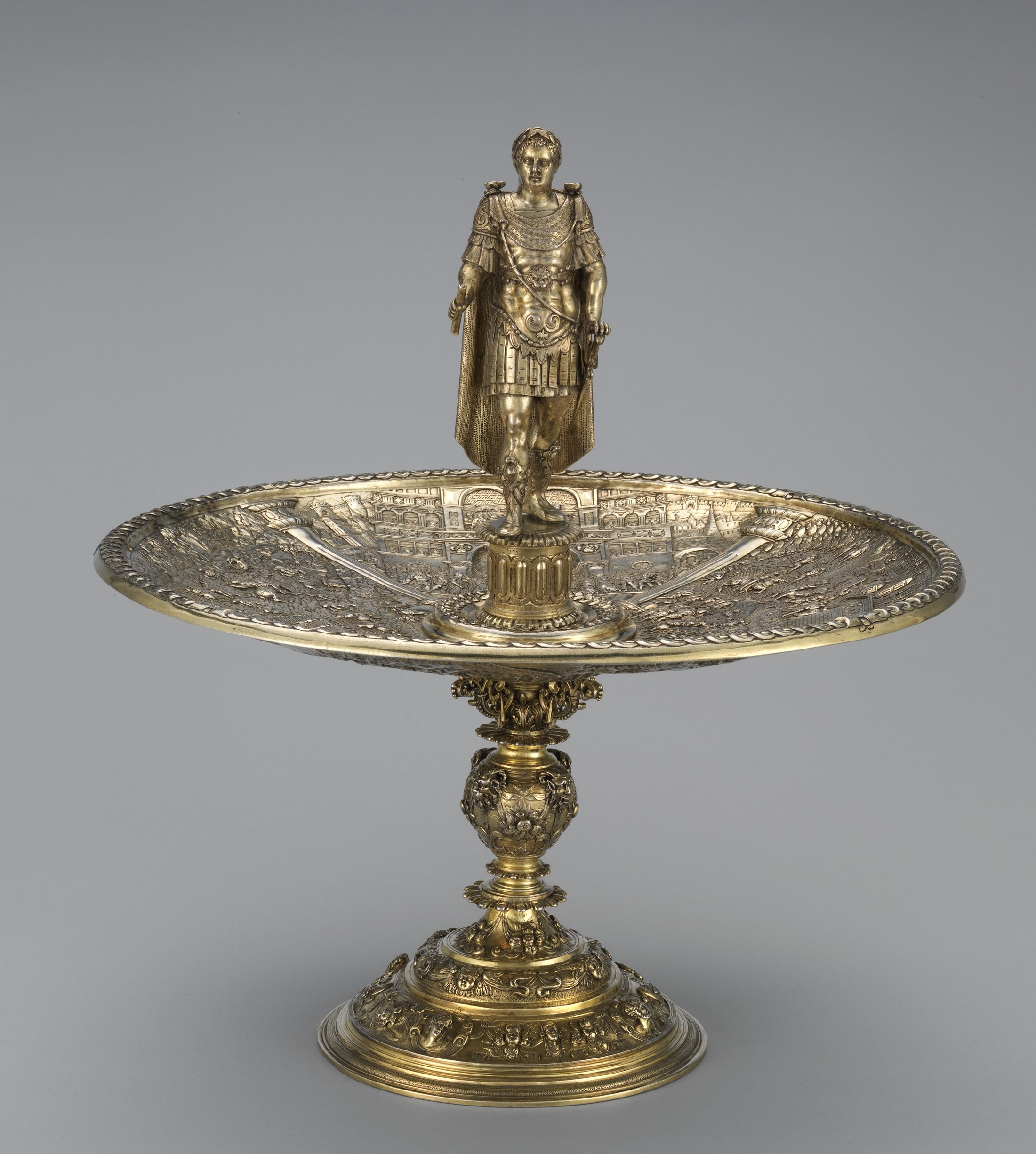
Aldobrandini Tazza of the Roman emperor Vitellius, c. 1590s

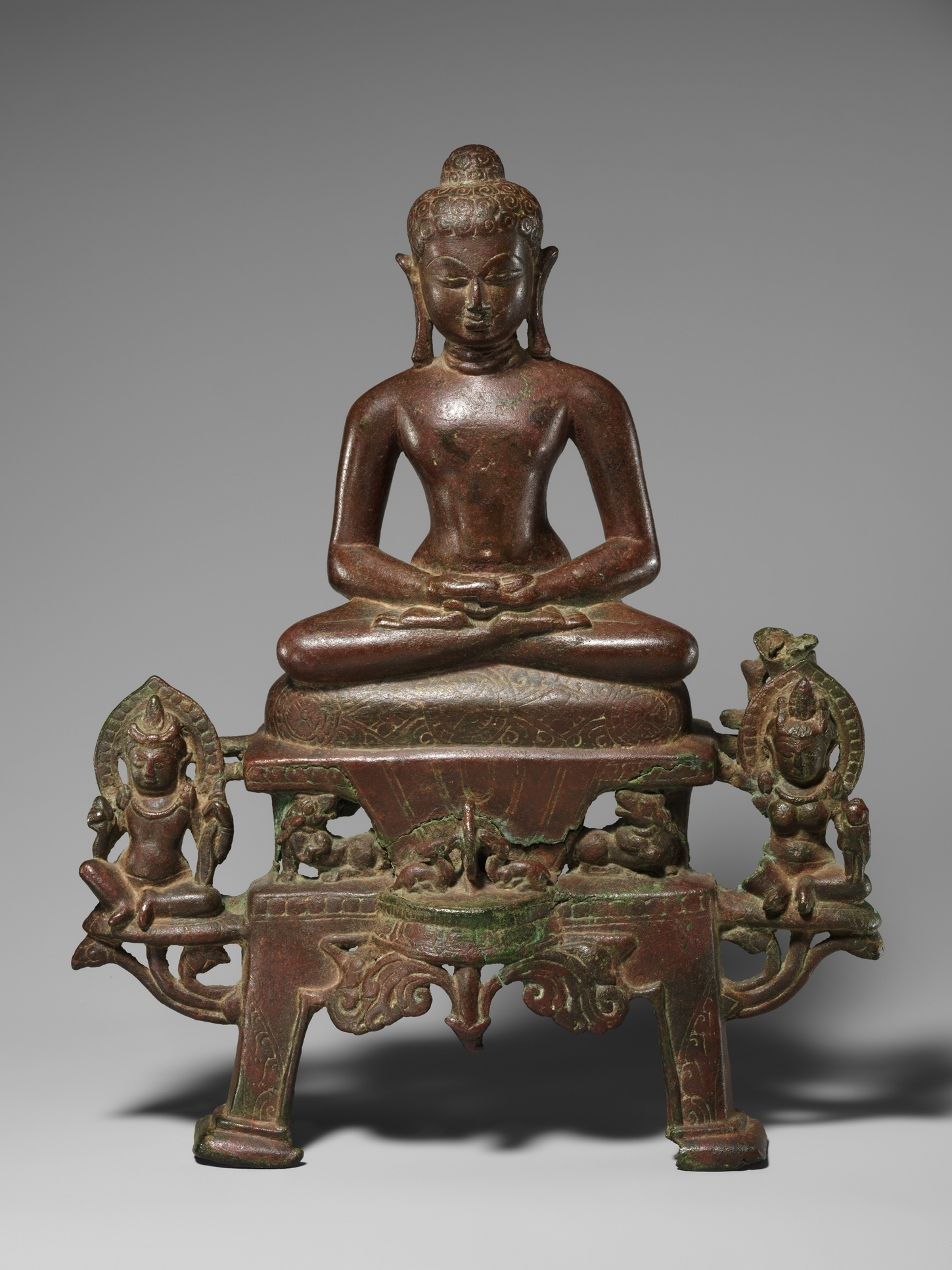
Neminatha, Akota Bronzes (7th century CE)

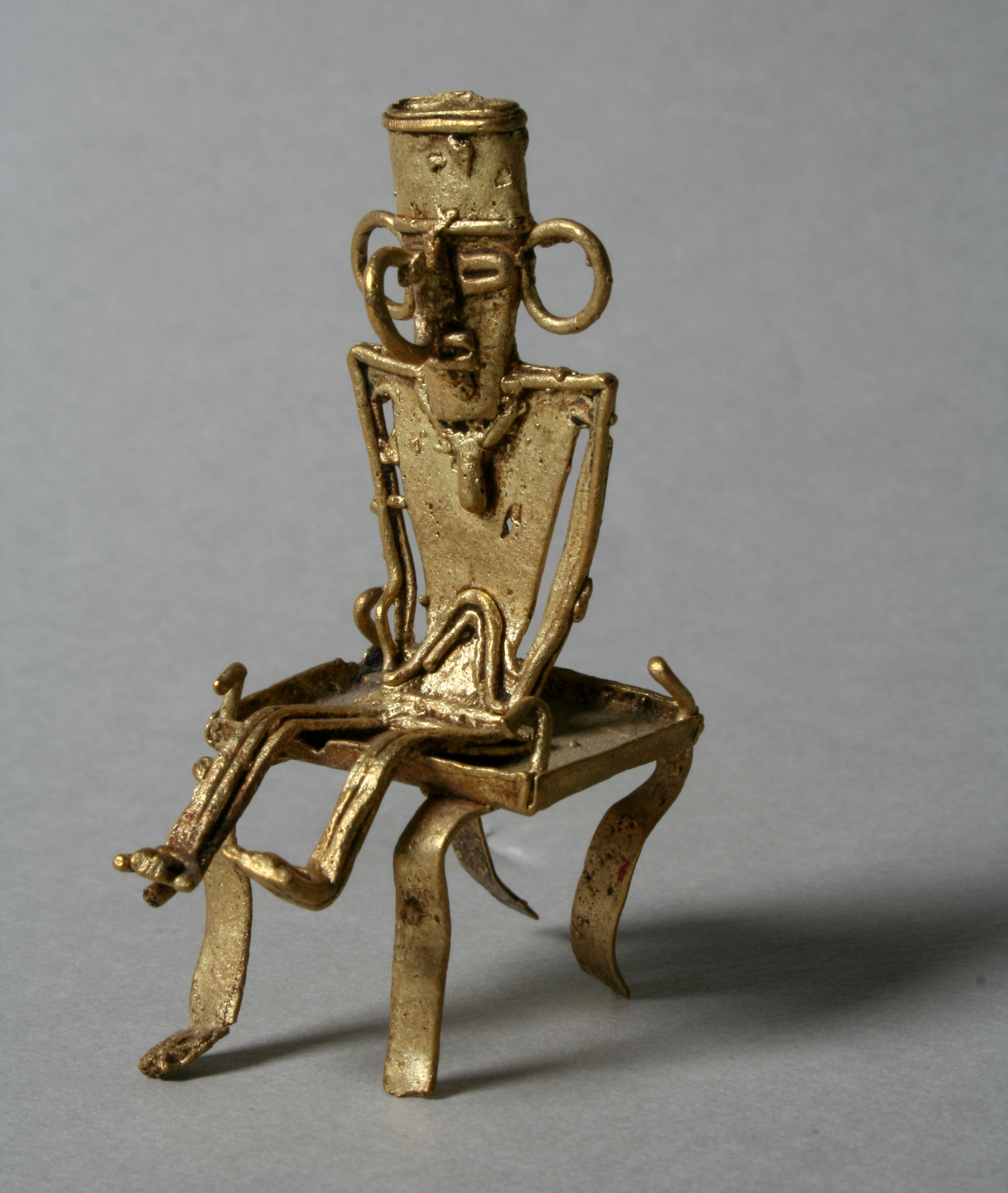
Muisca tunjo on stool, c. 10th–16th century, Lake Guatavita region, Altiplano Cundiboyacense

== Selected paintings ==
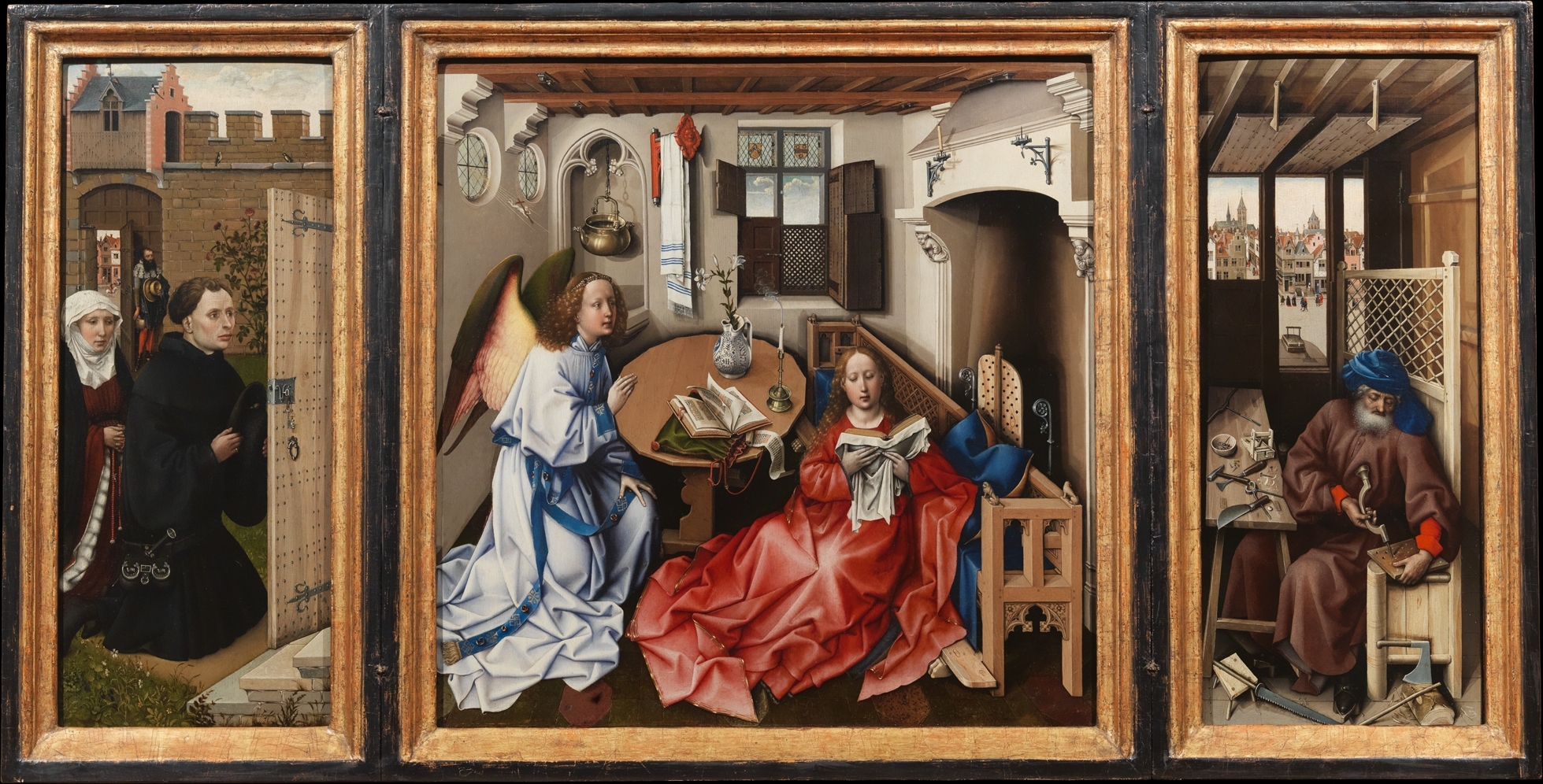
Robert Campin, the Mérode Altarpiece, c. 1425–1428

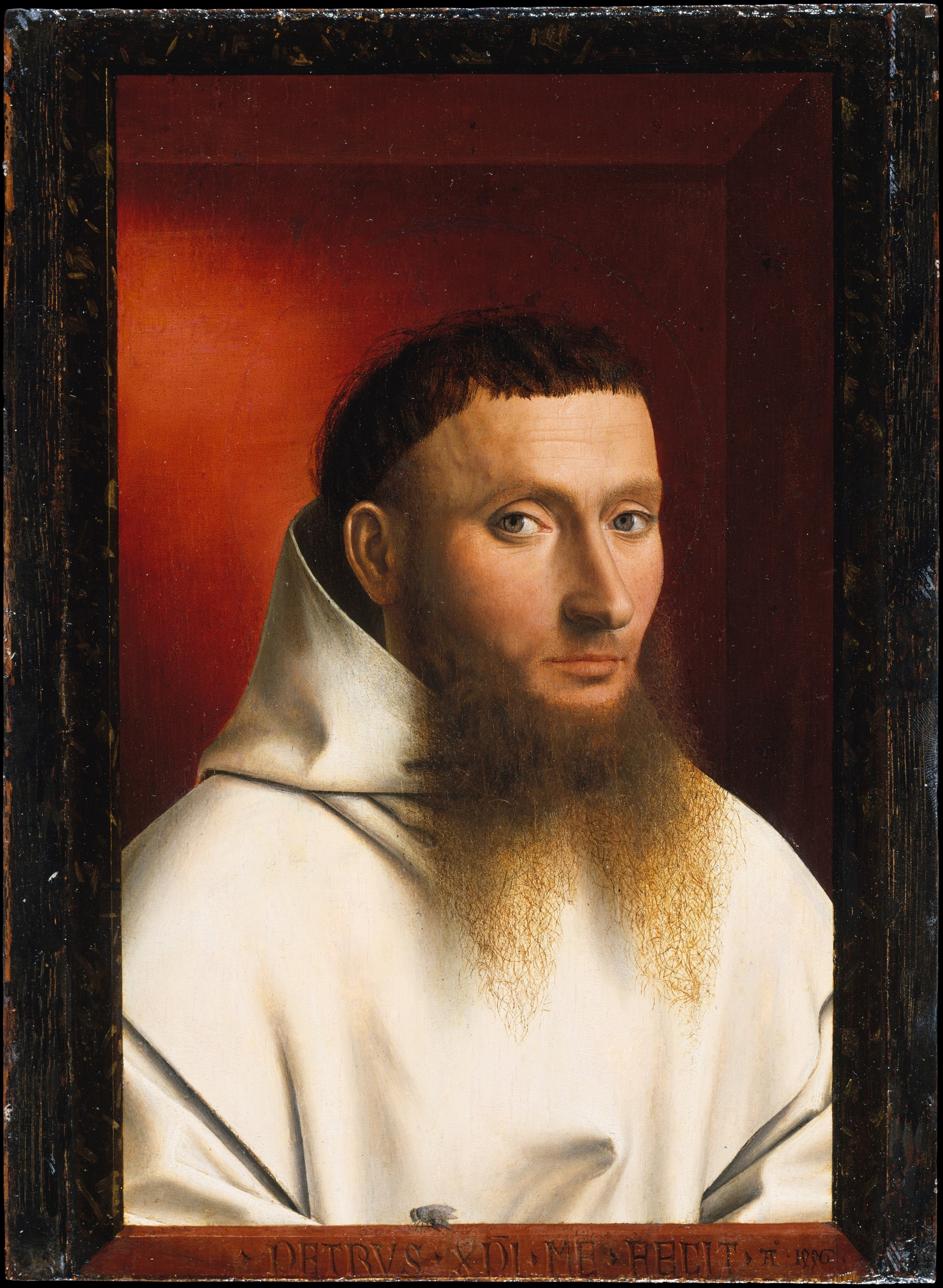
Petrus Christus, Portrait of a Carthusian, c. 1446

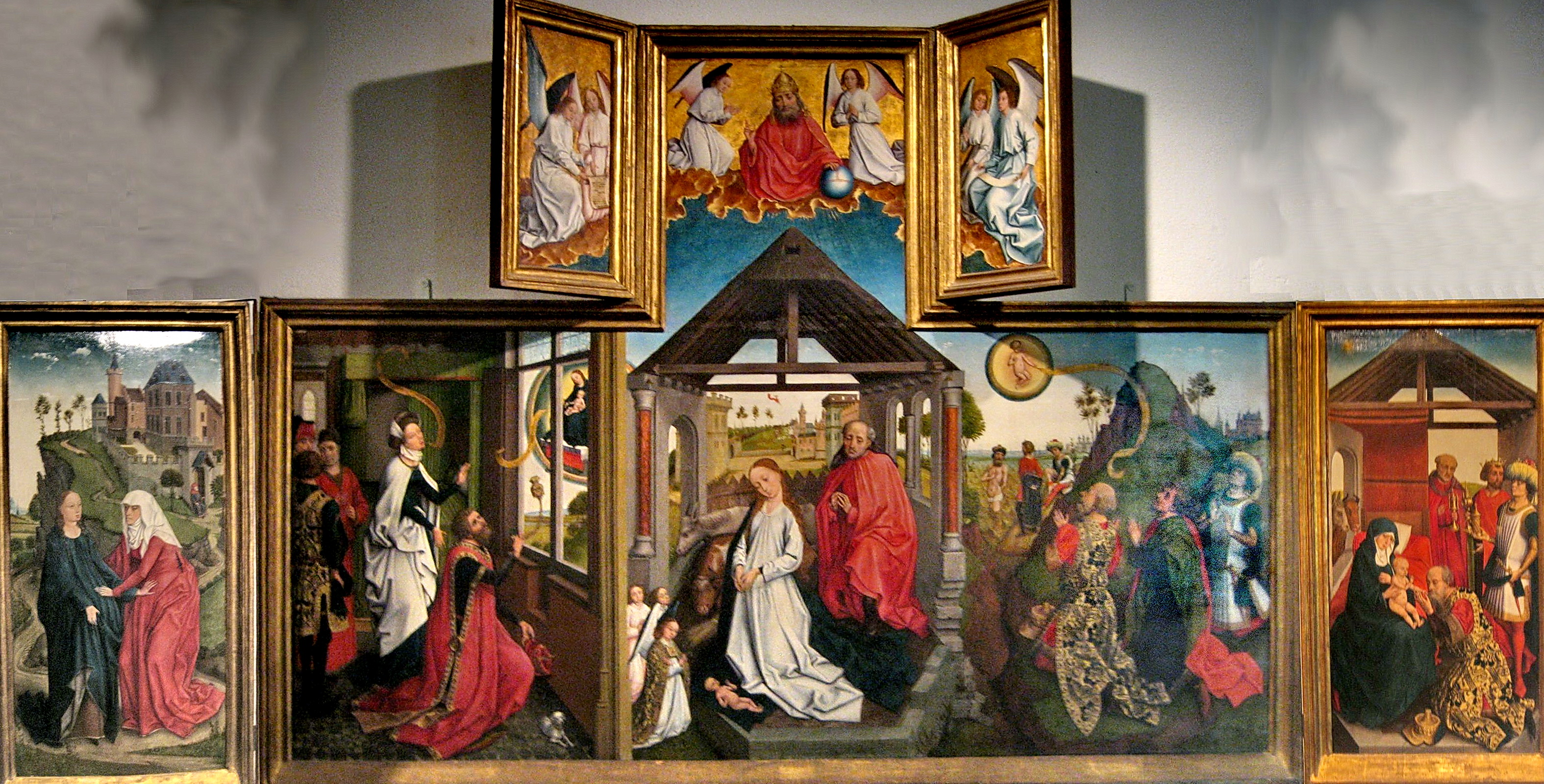
Rogier van der Weyden, Polyptych with the Nativity, c. 1450

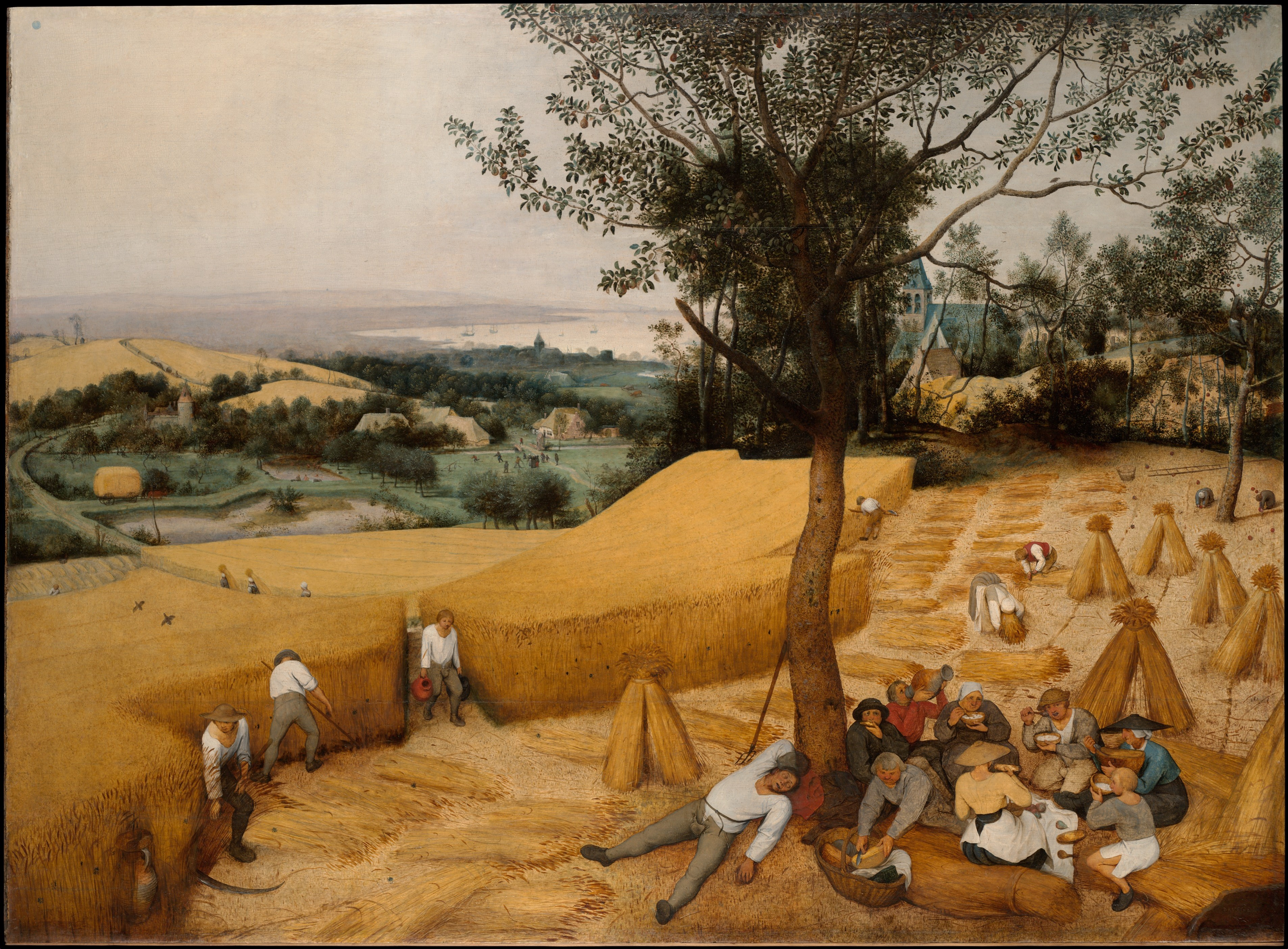
Pieter Bruegel the Elder, The Harvesters, 1565

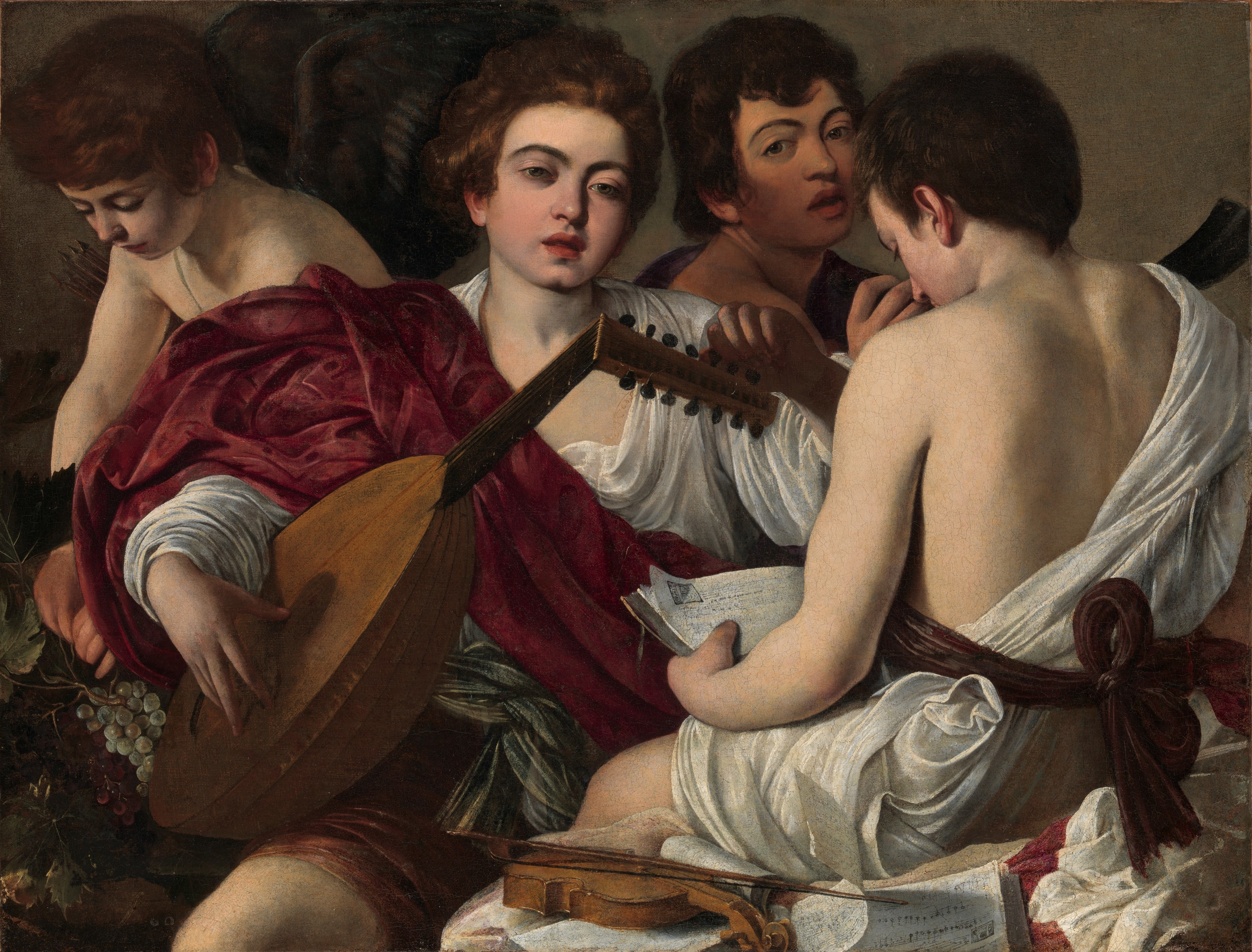
Caravaggio, The Musicians, 1595

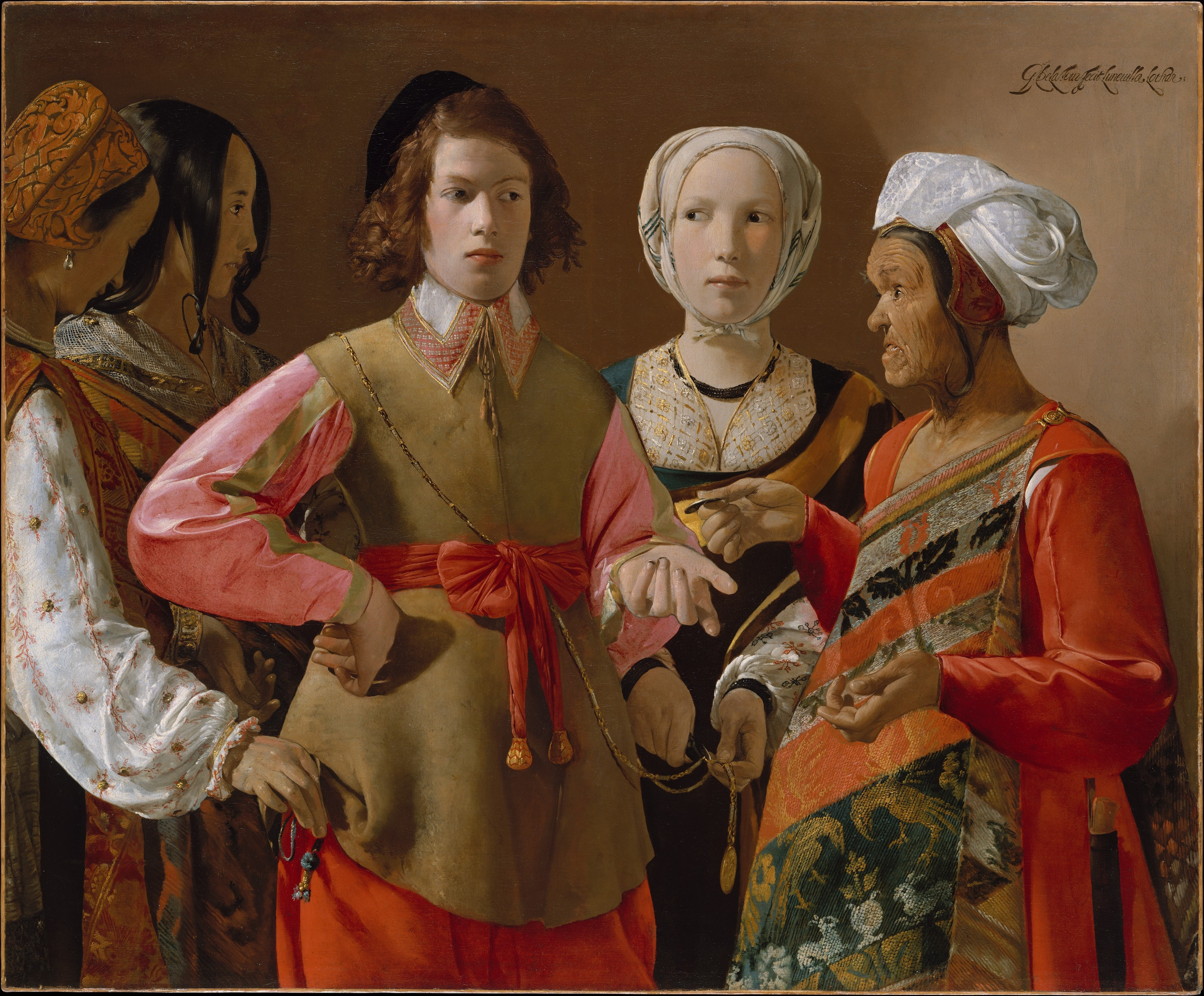
Georges de La Tour, The Fortune Teller, c. 1630

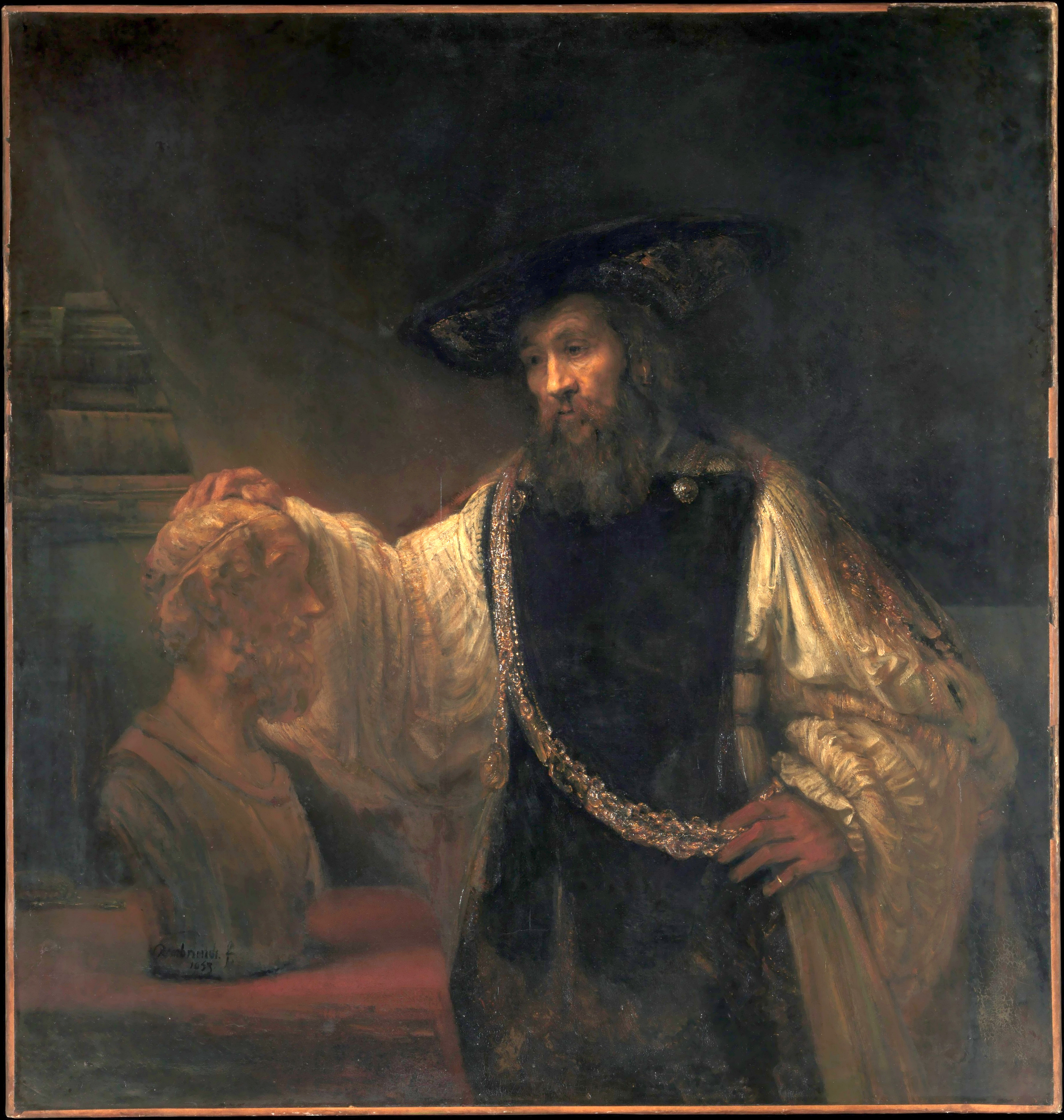
Rembrandt, Aristotle Contemplating the Bust of Homer, 1653

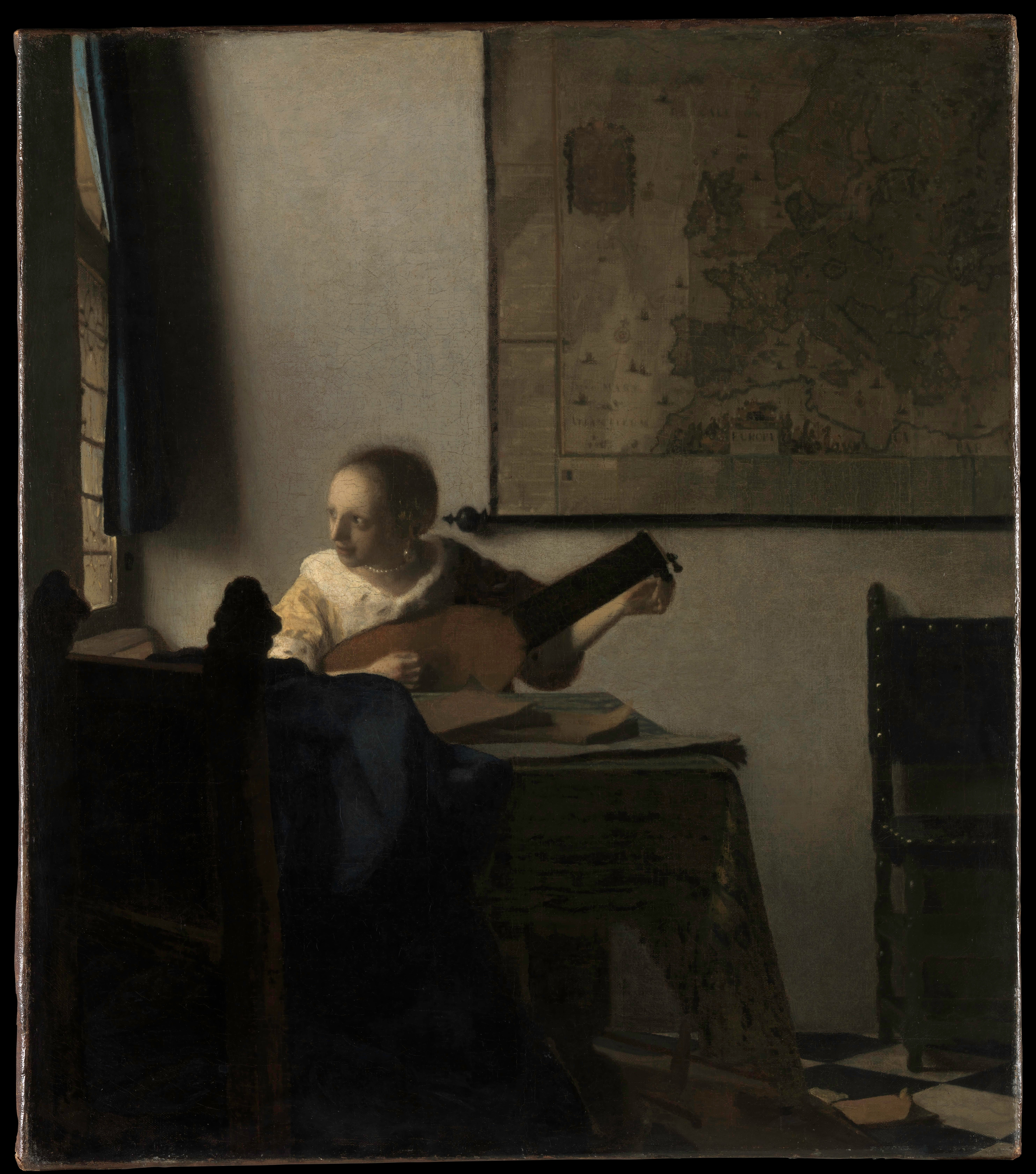
Johannes Vermeer, Woman with a Lute, 1662

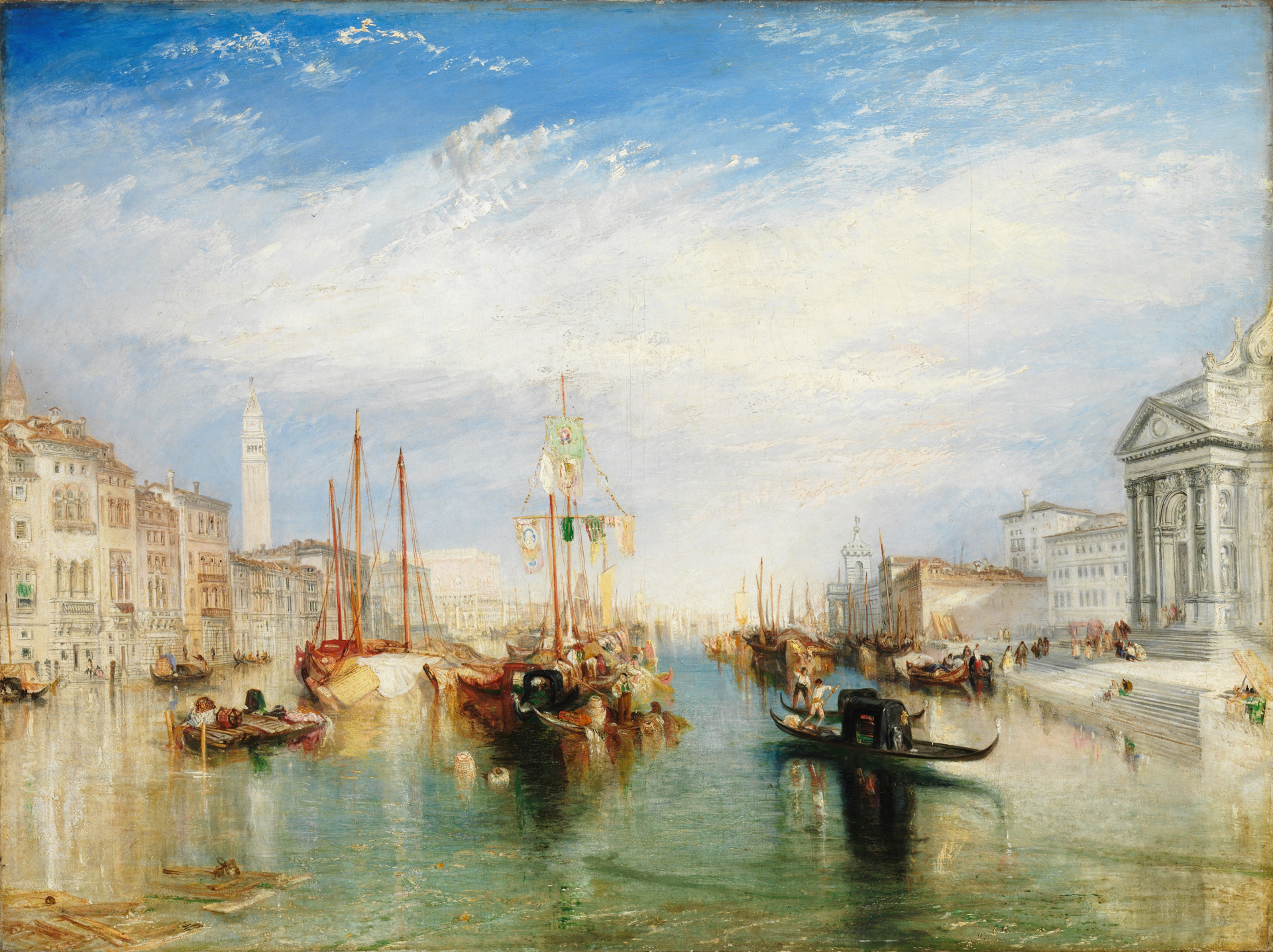
J. M. W. Turner, The Grand Canal, 1835

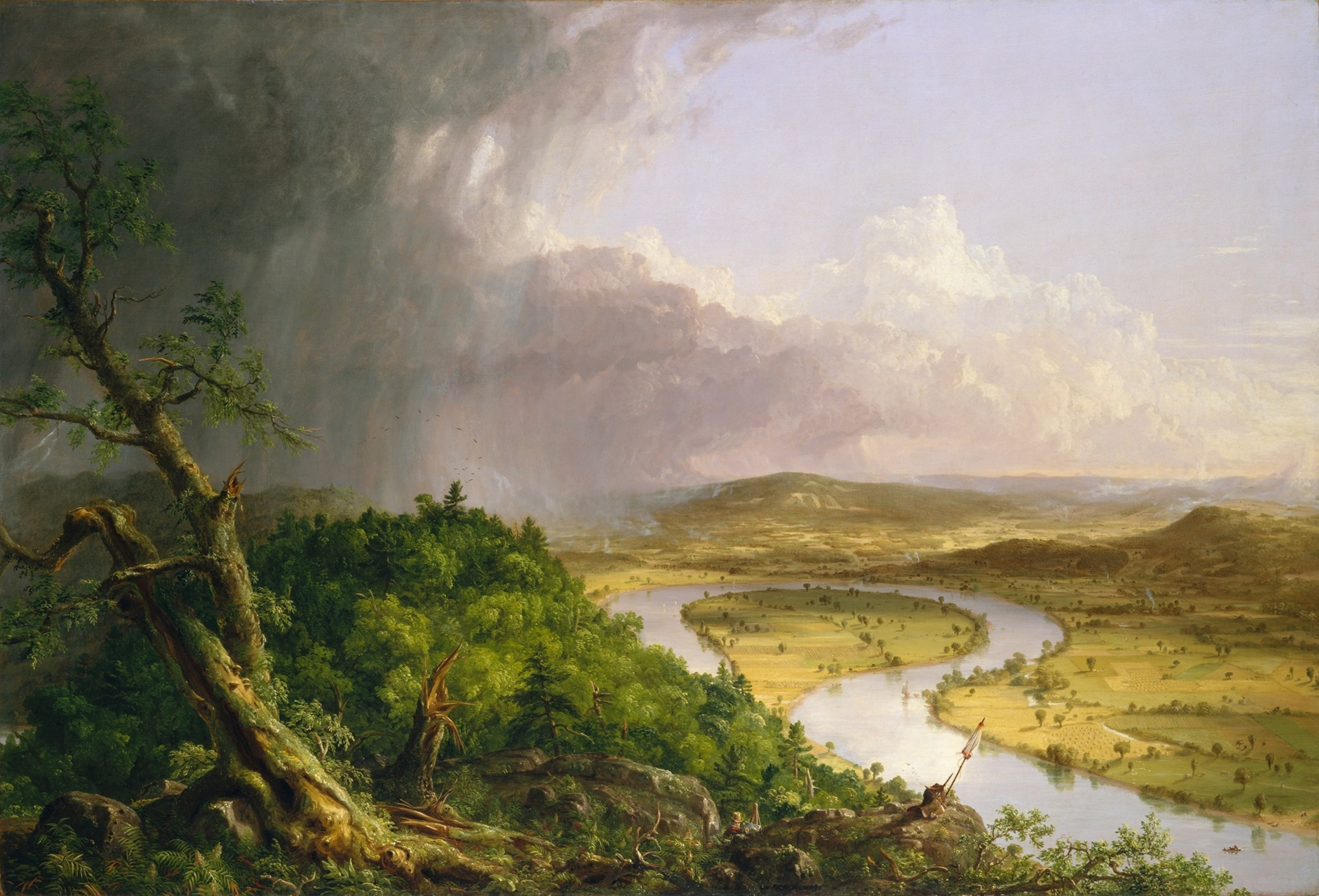
Thomas Cole, The Oxbow, 1836

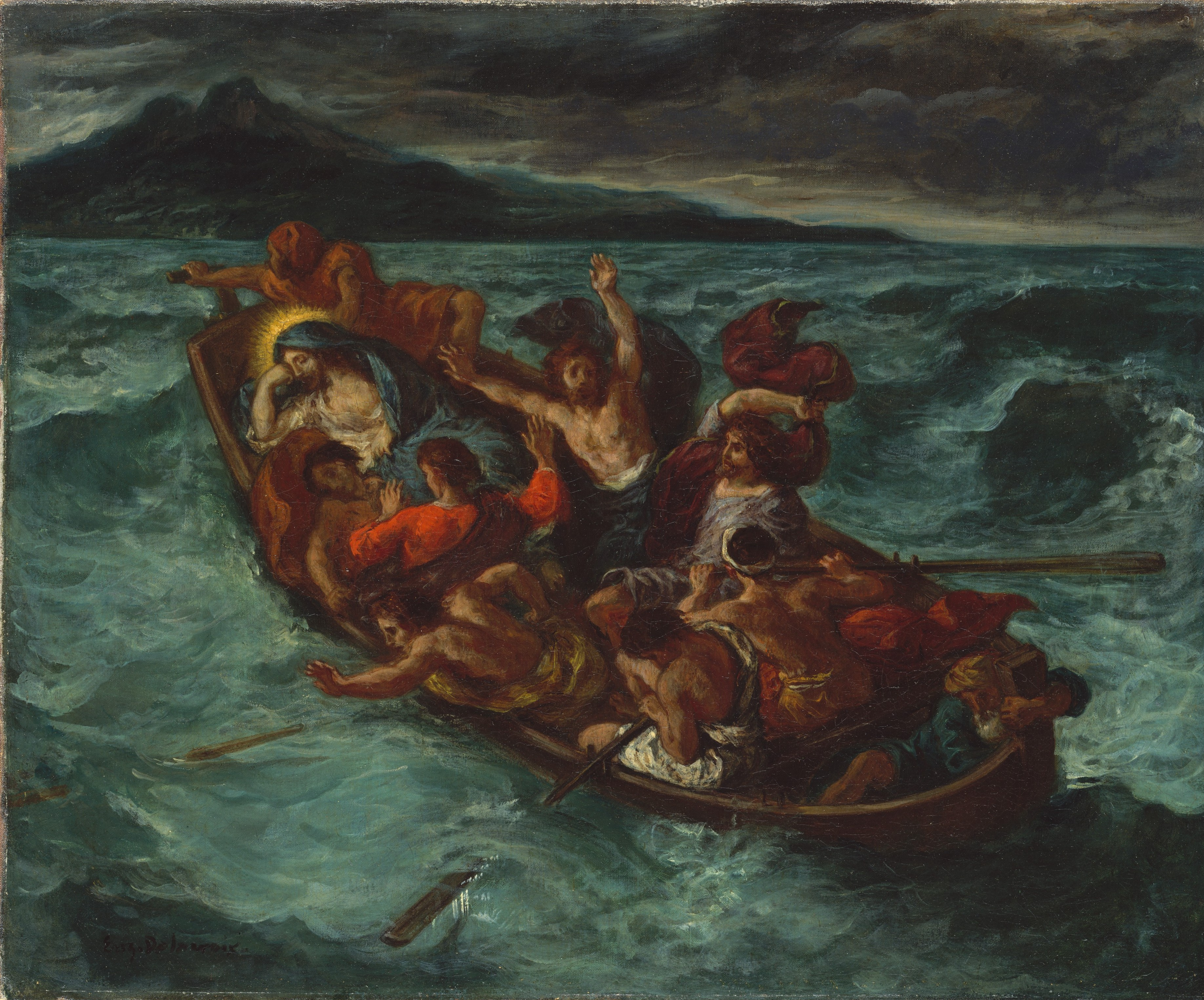
Eugène Delacroix, Christ Asleep during the Tempest, 1853

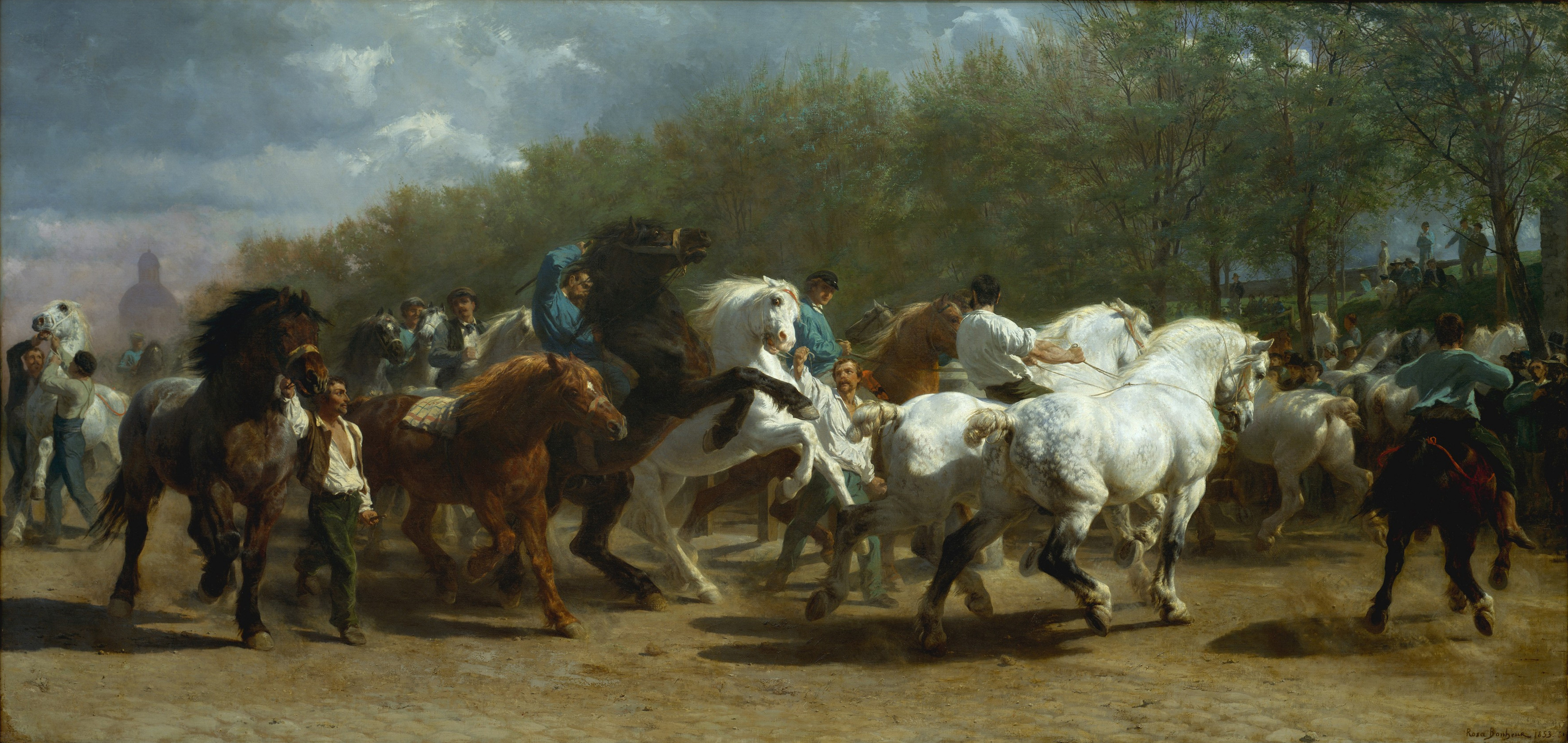
Rosa Bonheur, The Horse Fair, 1853–1855

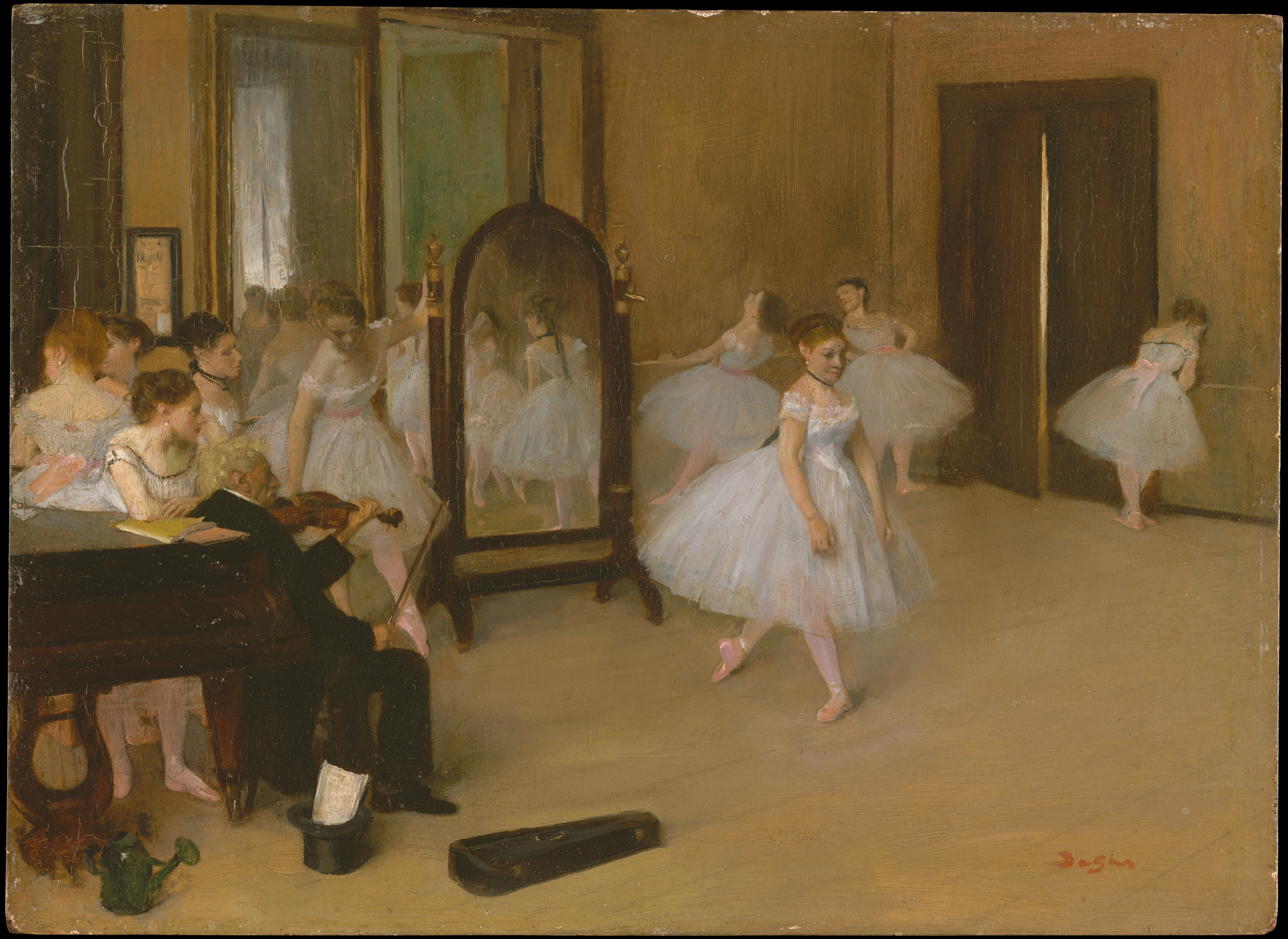
Edgar Degas, The Dancing Class, 1872

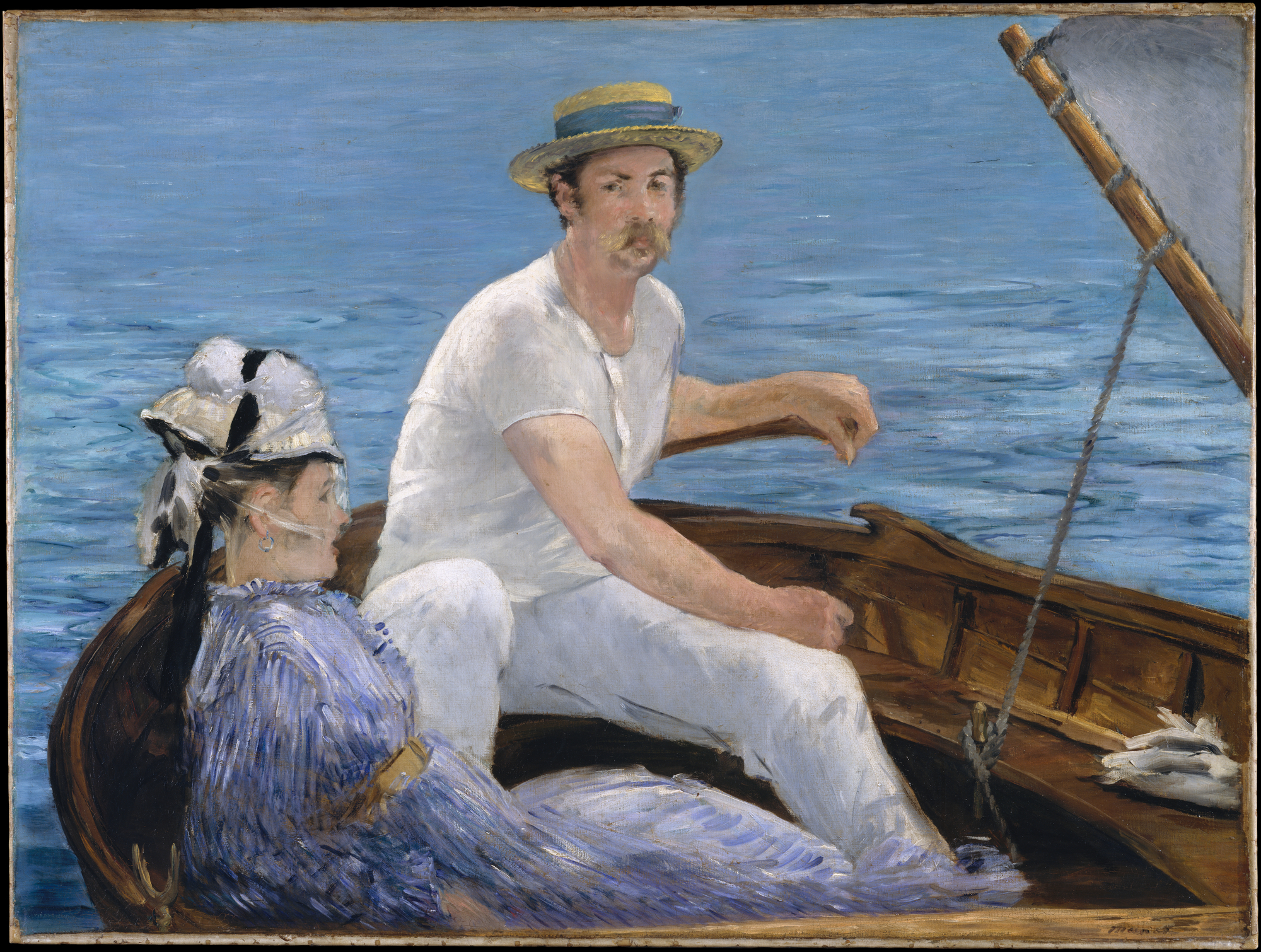
Édouard Manet, Boating, 1874

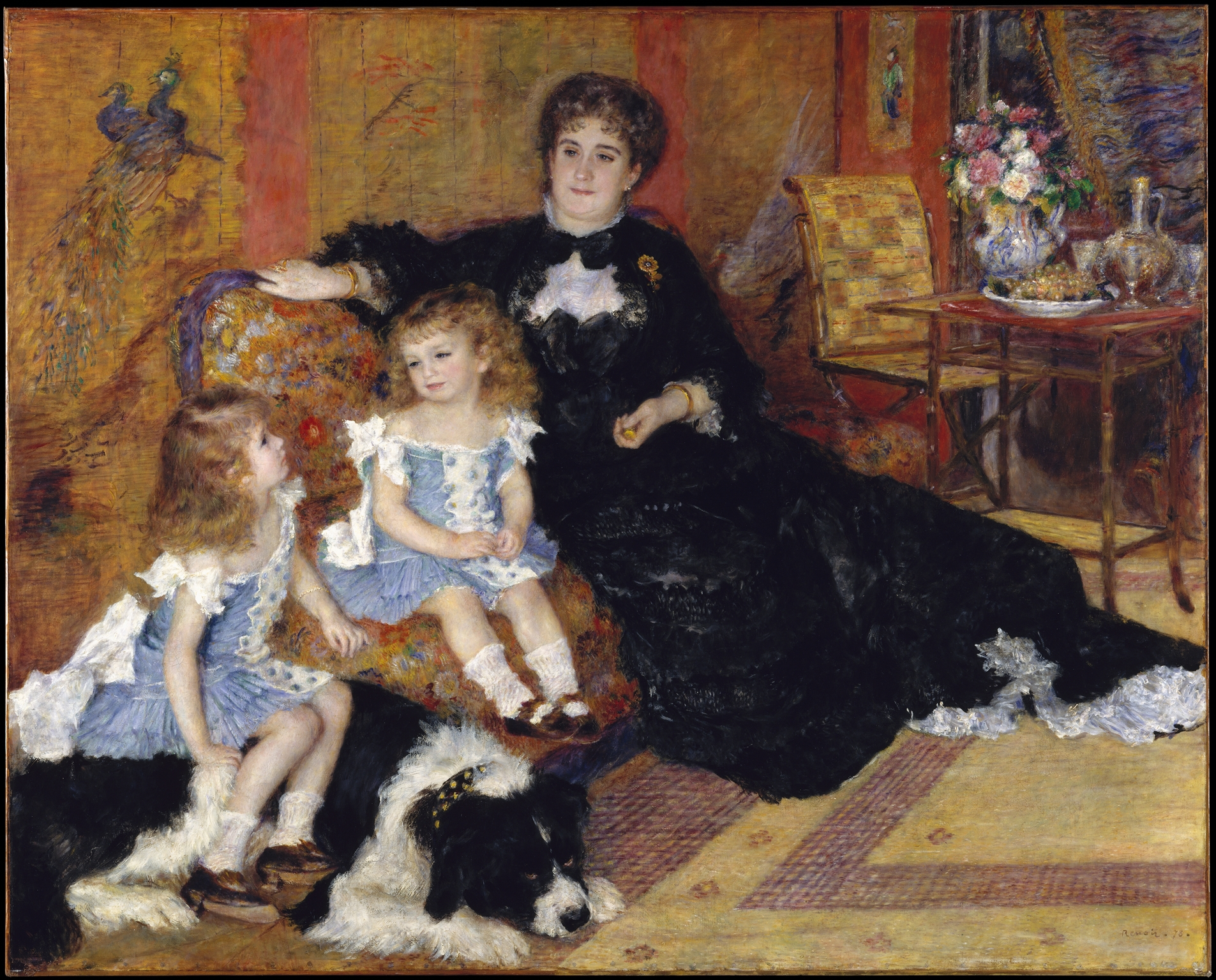
Pierre-Auguste Renoir, Mme. Charpentier and Her Children, 1878

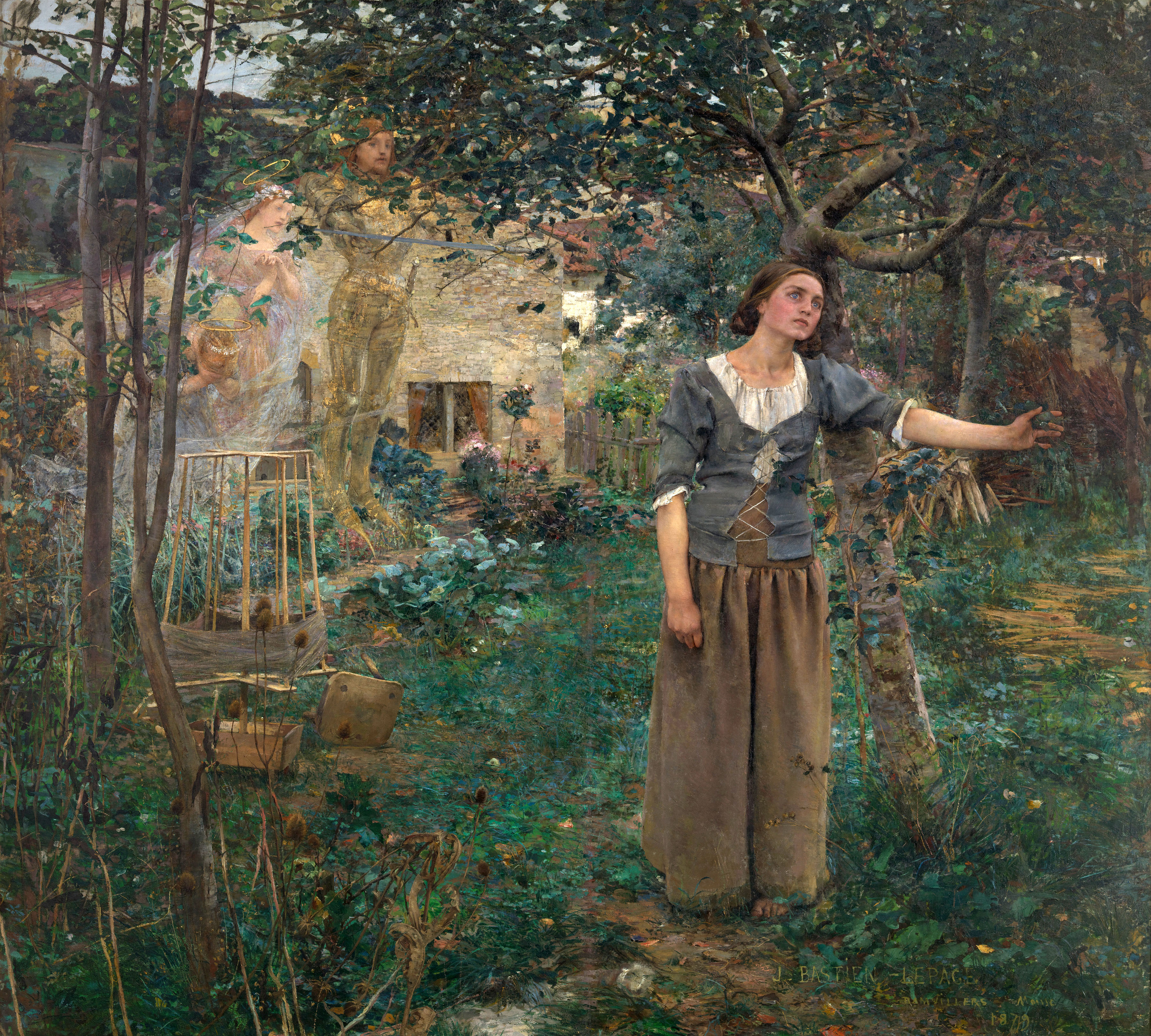
Jules Bastien-Lepage, Jeanne d'Arc (Joan of Arc), 1879

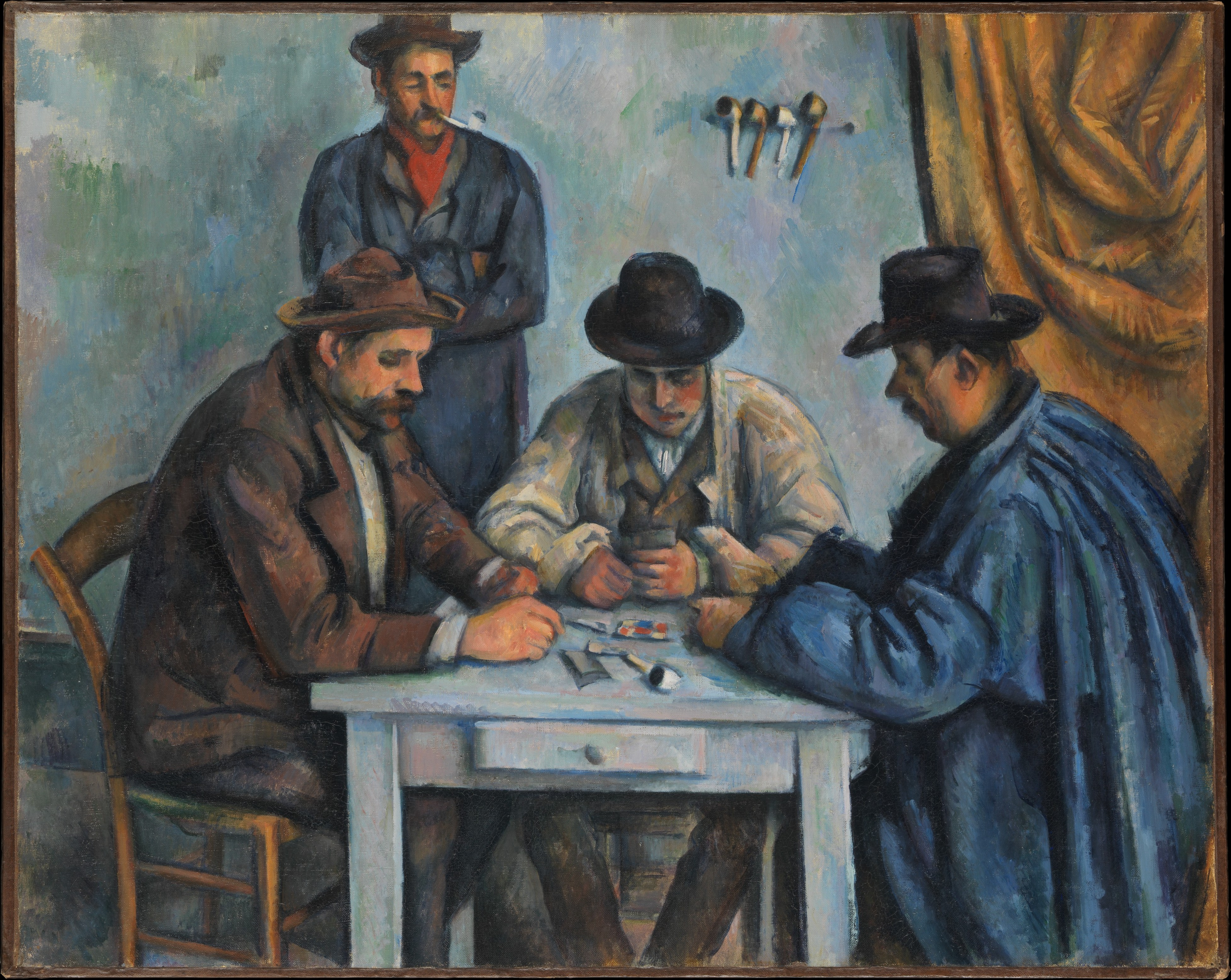
Paul Cézanne, The Card Players, 1890–1892

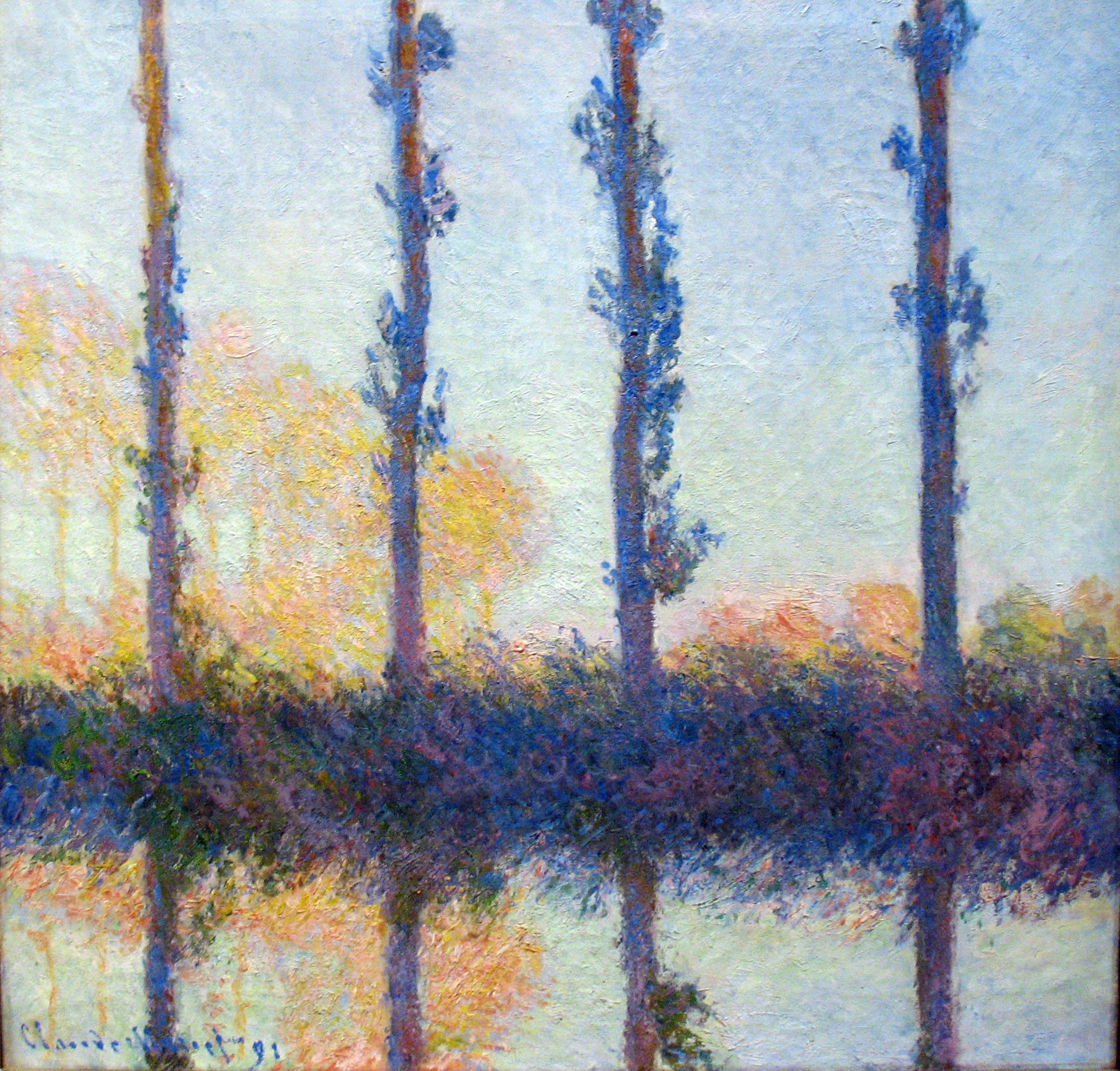
Claude Monet, The Four Trees, (Four Poplars on the Banks of the Epte River near Giverny), 1891

Paul Gauguin, The Siesta, 1894

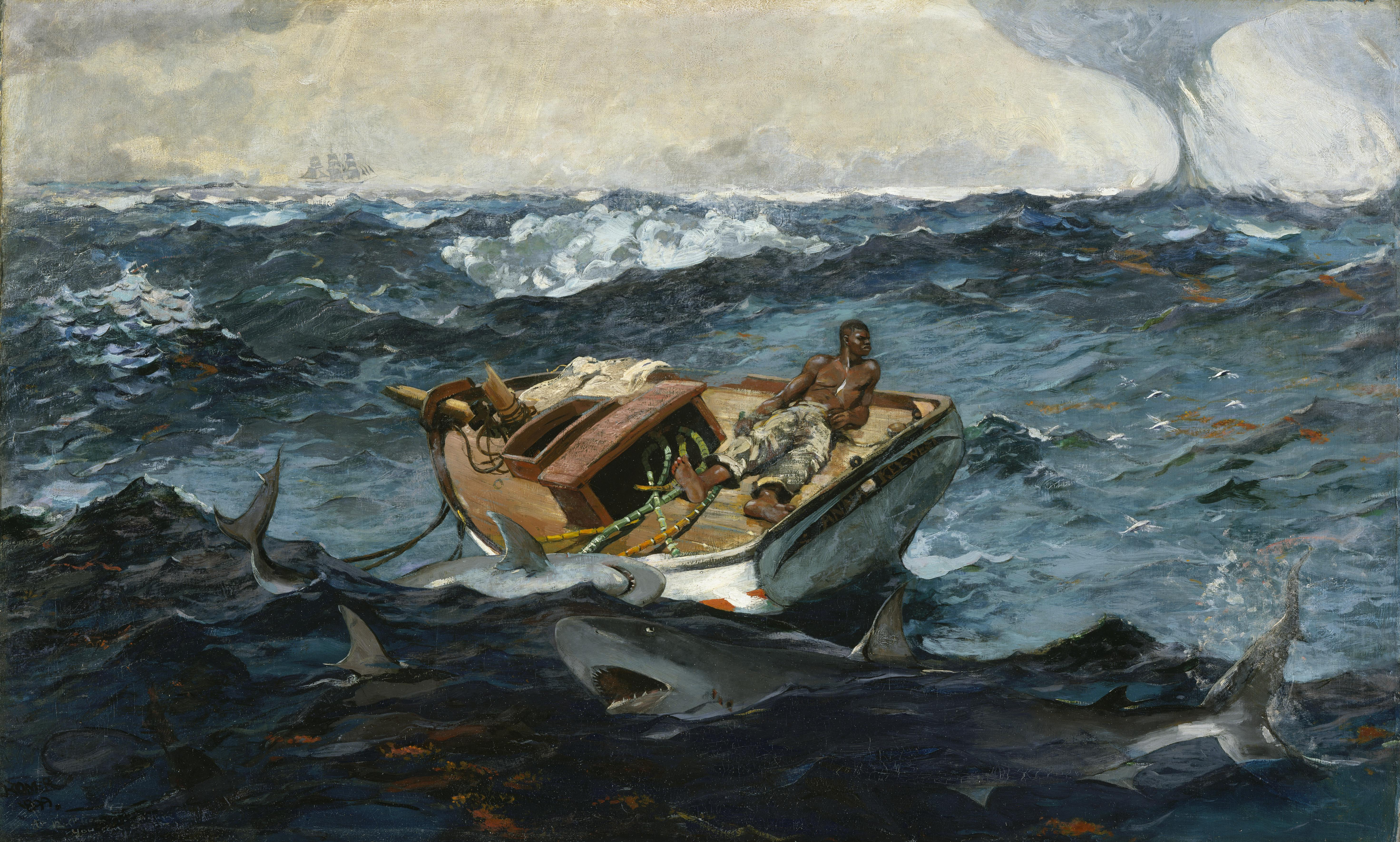
Winslow Homer, The Gulf Stream, 1899

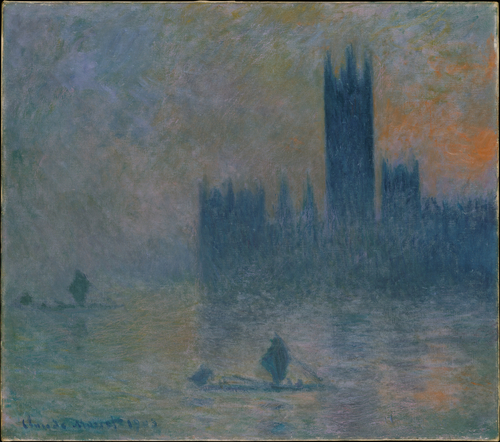
Claude Monet, The Houses of Parliament (Effect of Fog), 1903–1904

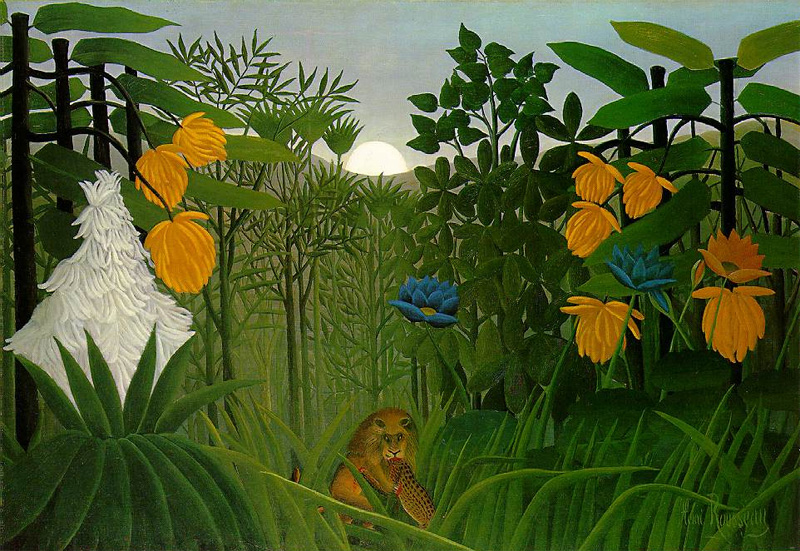
Henri Rousseau, The Repast of the Lion, c. 1907

Pablo Picasso, The Oil Mill (Moulin à huile), 1909

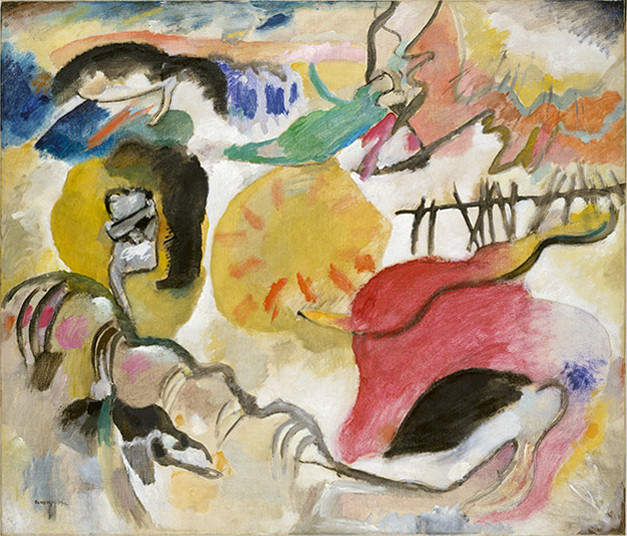
Wassily Kandinsky, Improvisation 27, Garden of Love II, 1912 (exhibited at the 1913 Armory Show)

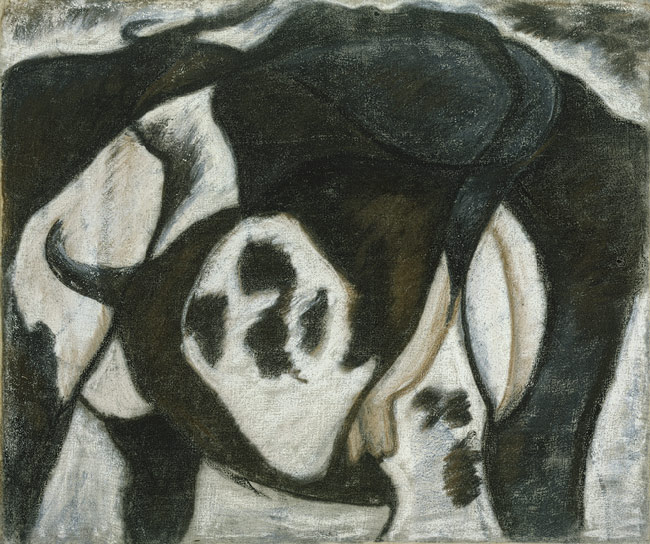
Arthur Dove, Cow, 1914
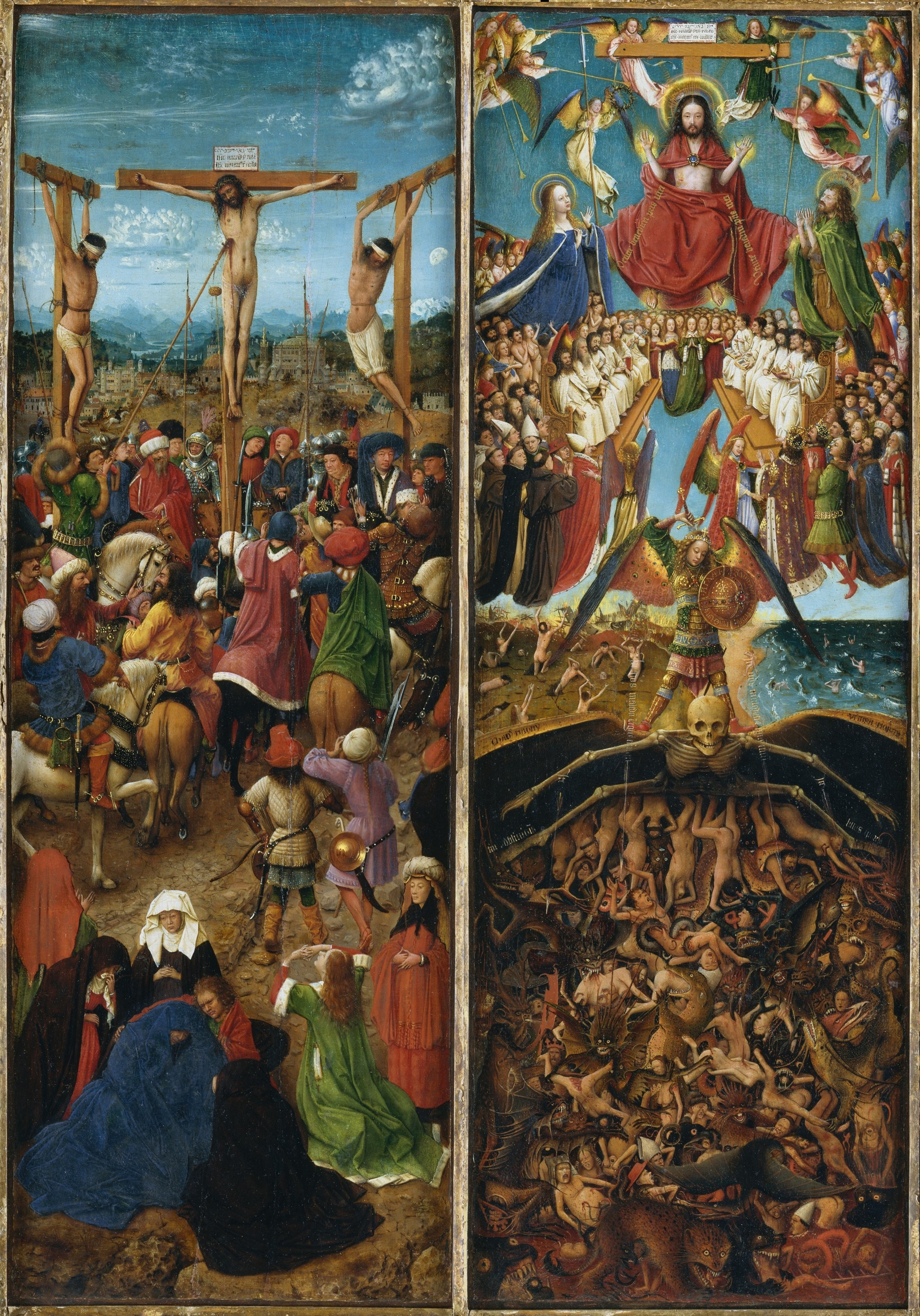
Jan van Eyck, Crucifixion and Last Judgement diptych, c. 1430–1440

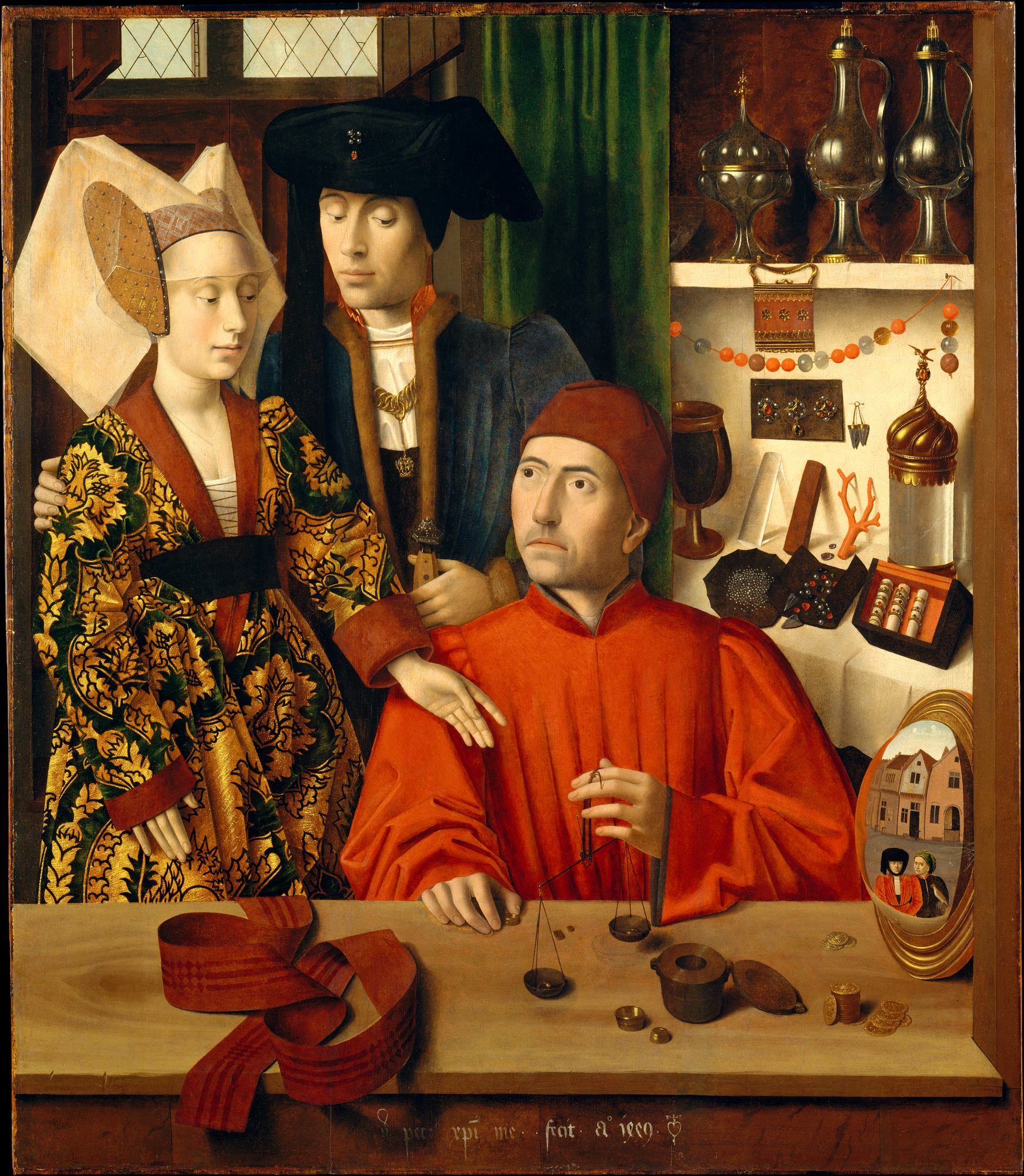
Petrus Christus, A Goldsmith in His Shop, Possibly Saint Eligius, 1449

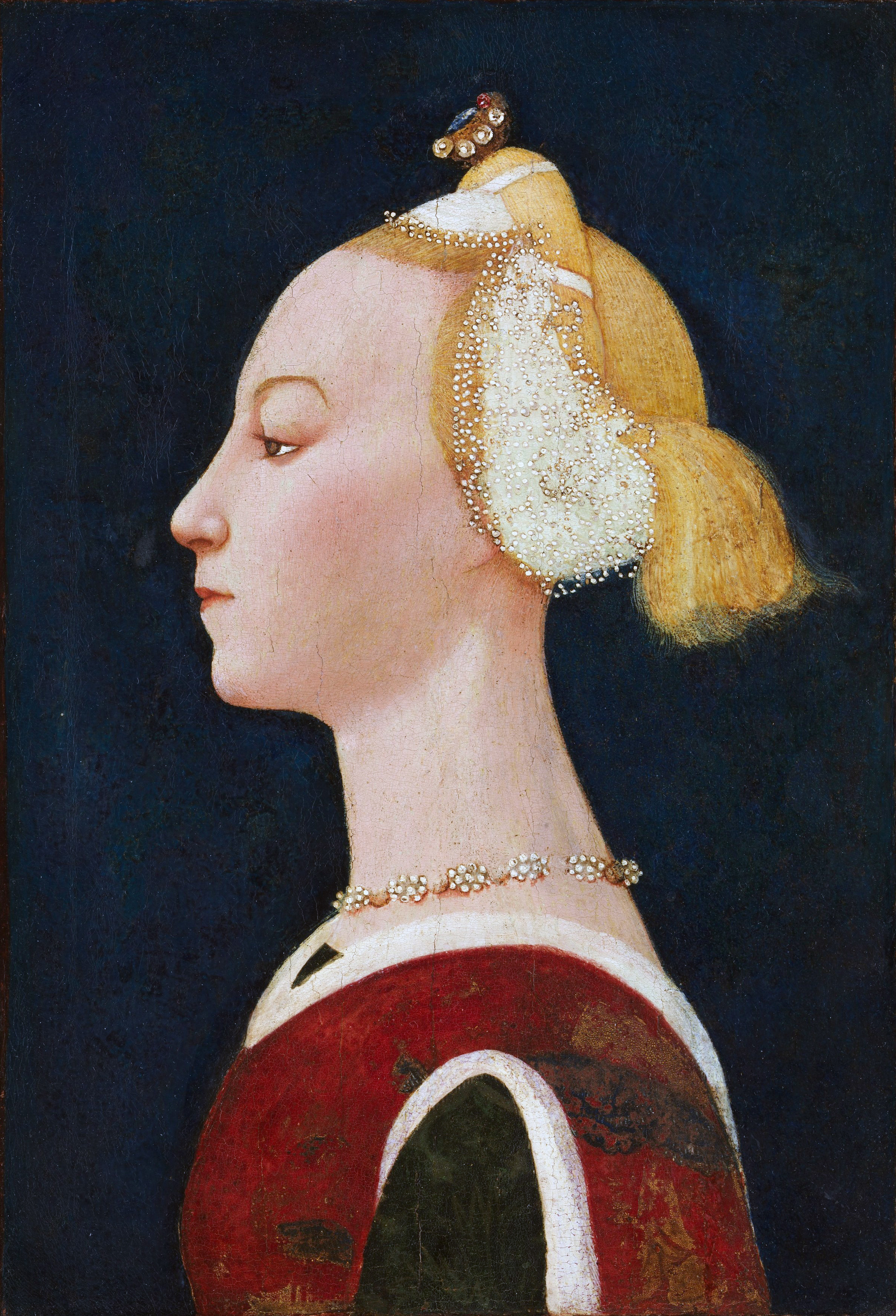
Paolo Uccello, Portrait of a Lady, c. 1450, Florence

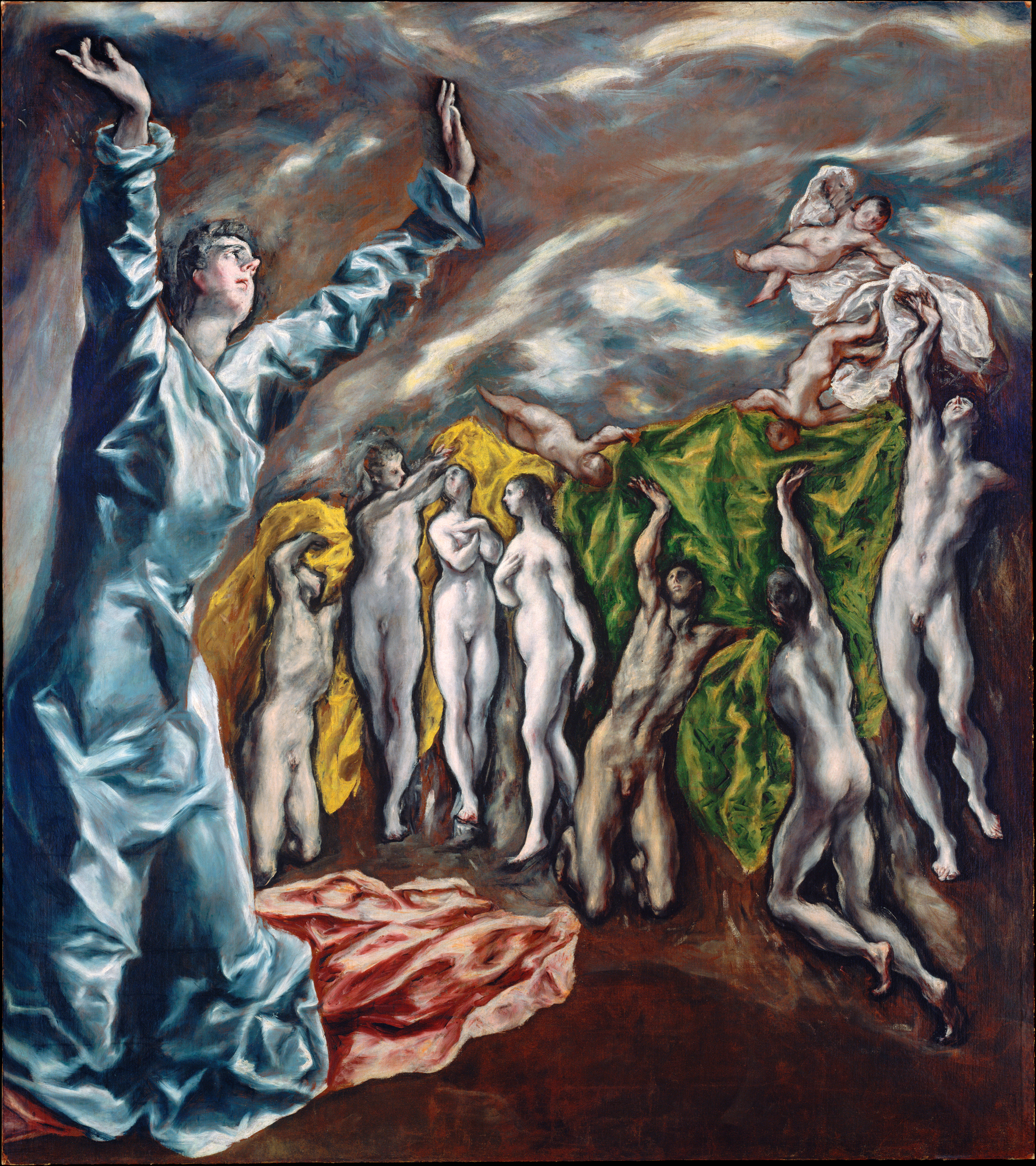
El Greco, Opening of the Fifth Seal, 1608–1614

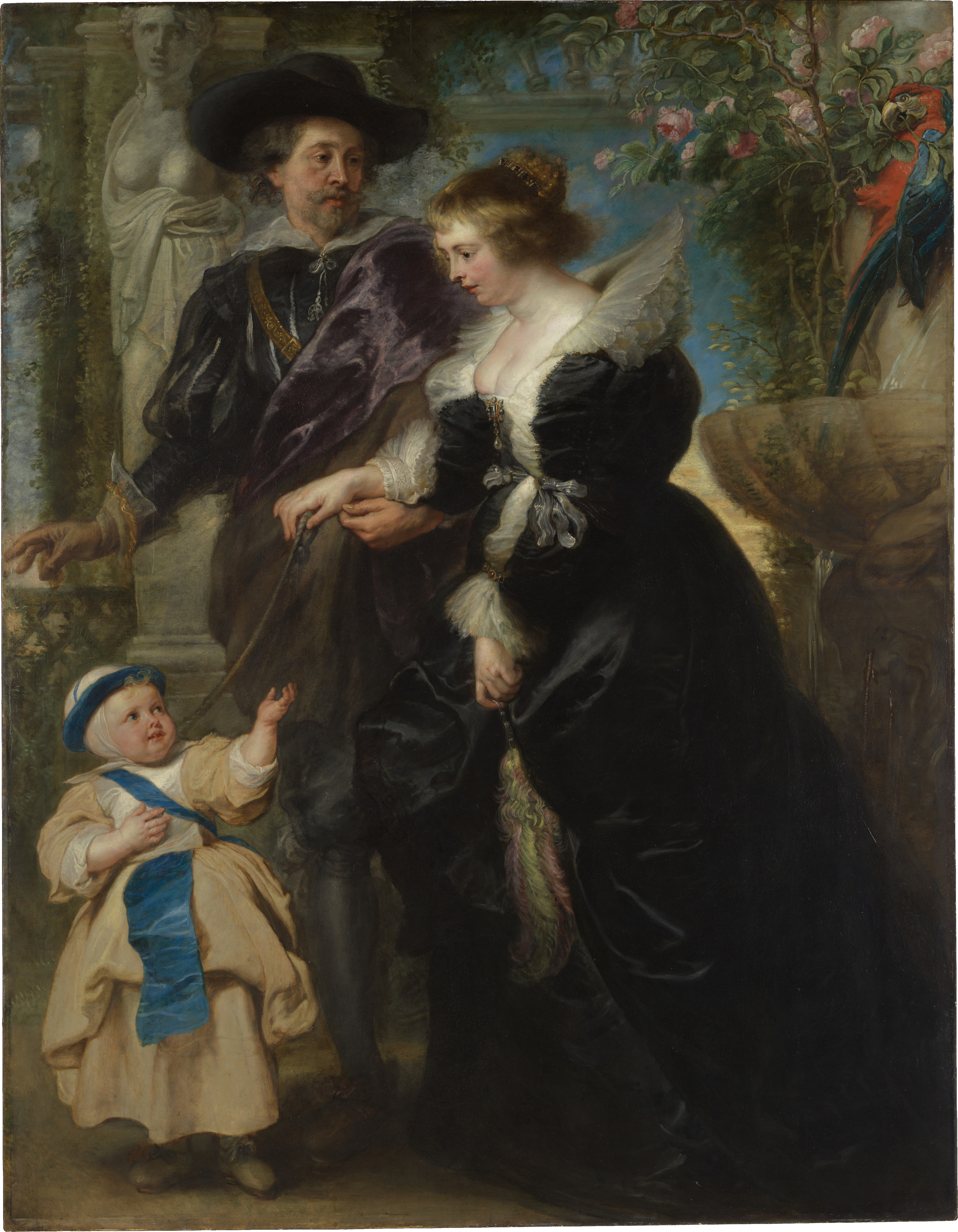
Peter Paul Rubens, Rubens, Helena Fourment, and Their Son Frans, ca. 1635

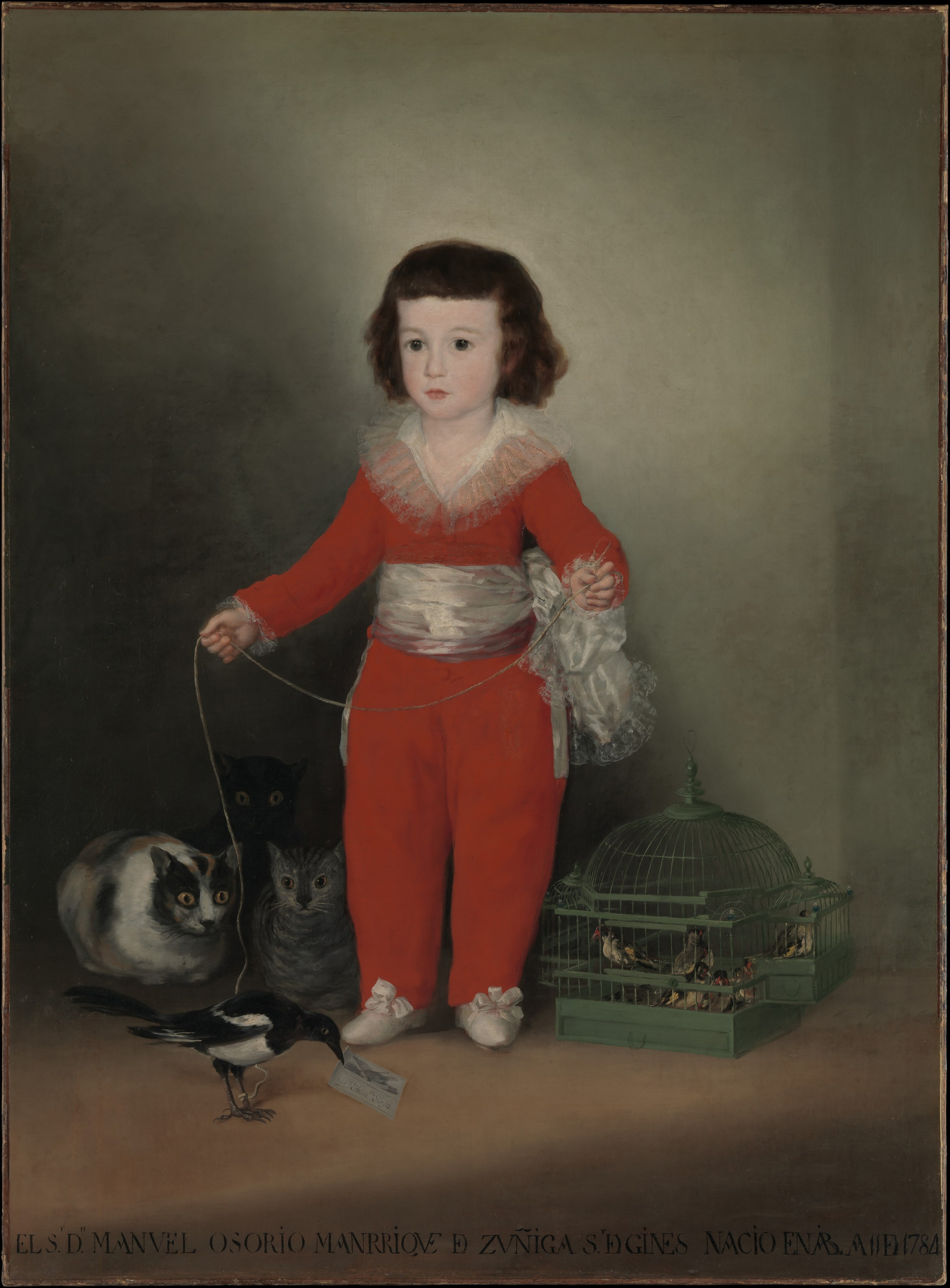
Francisco Goya, Manuel Osorio Manrique de Zúñiga, 1777–1778

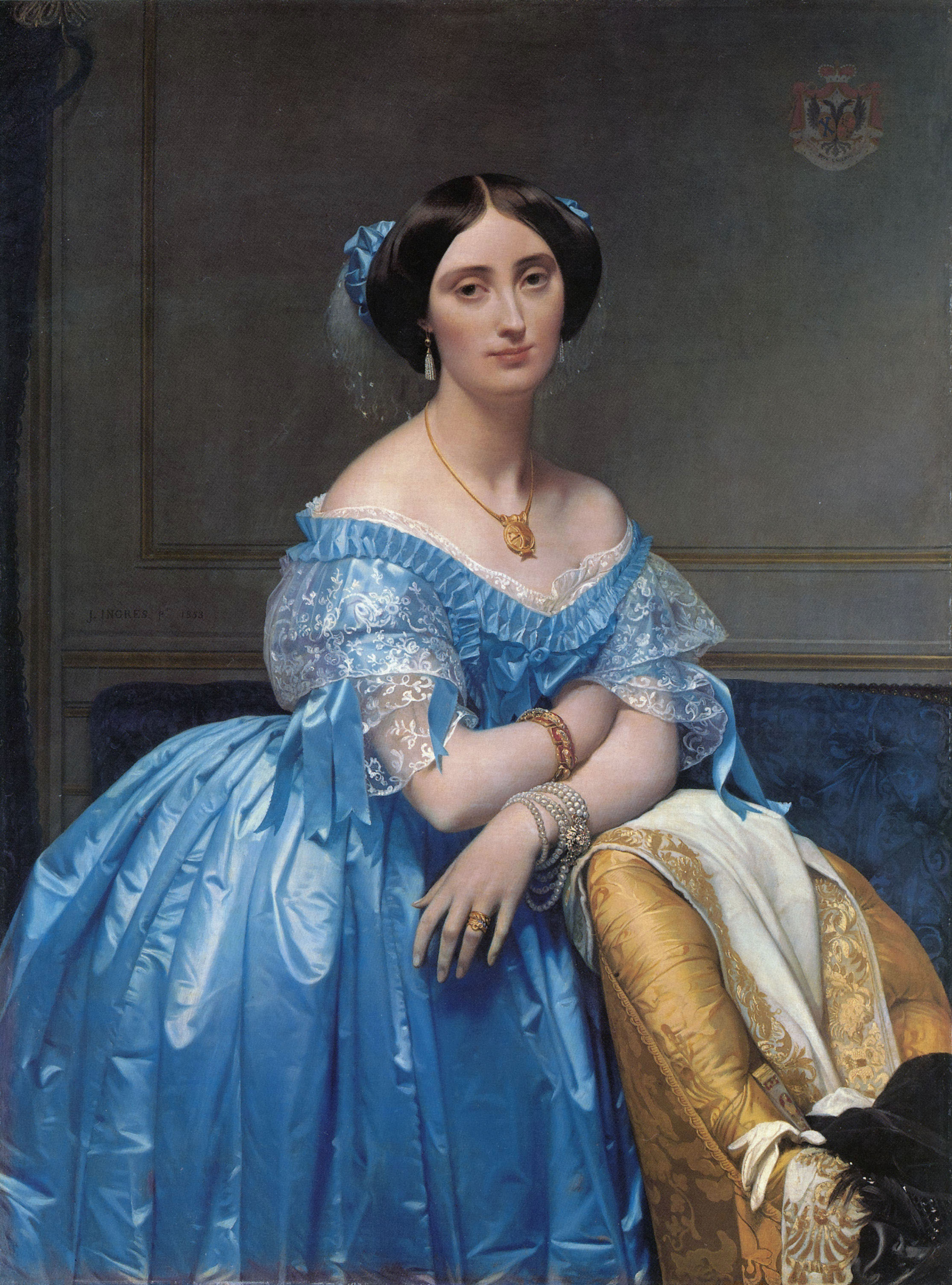
Jean-Auguste-Dominique Ingres, The Princesse de Broglie, 1851–1853

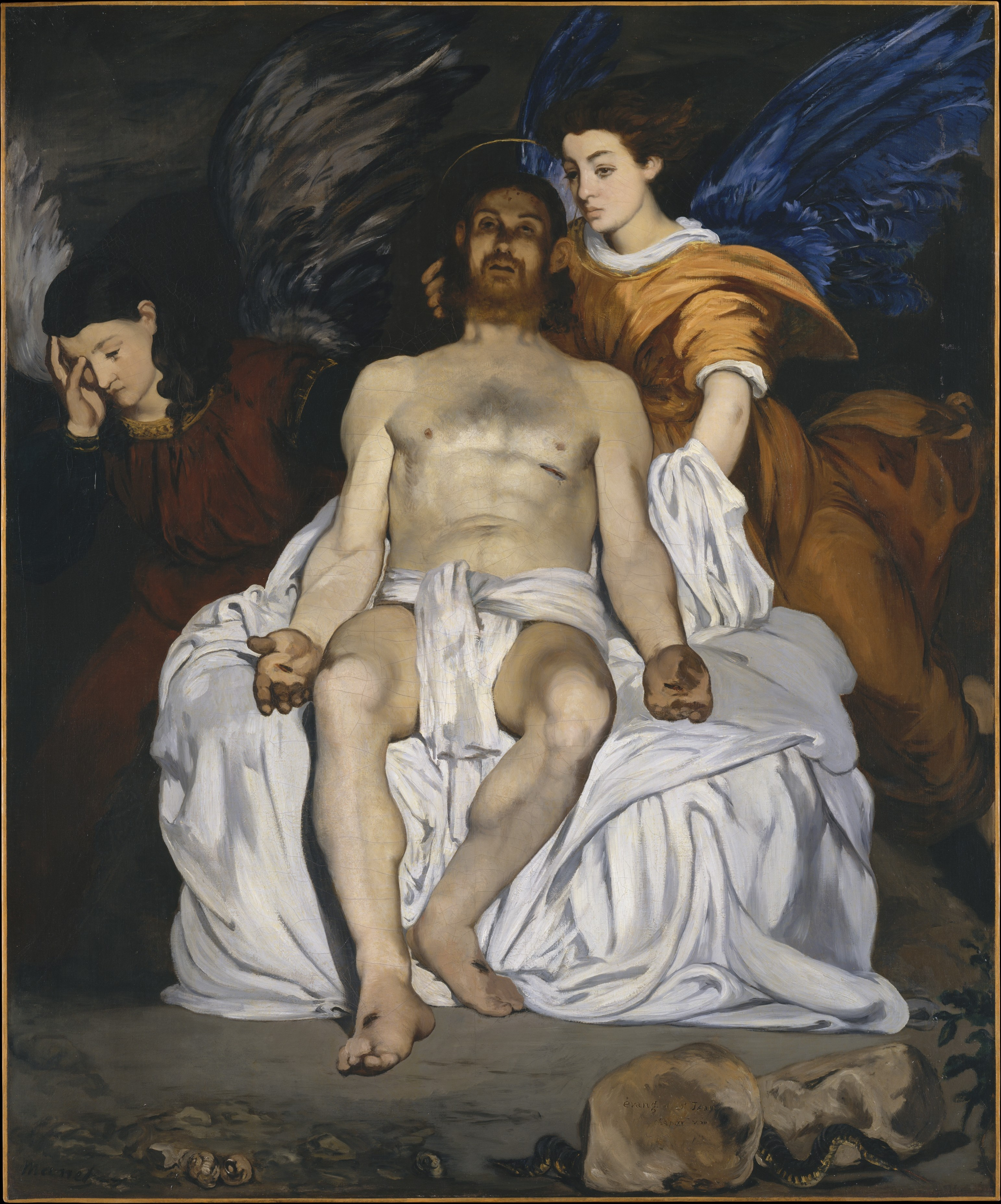
Édouard Manet, The Dead Christ with Angels, 1864

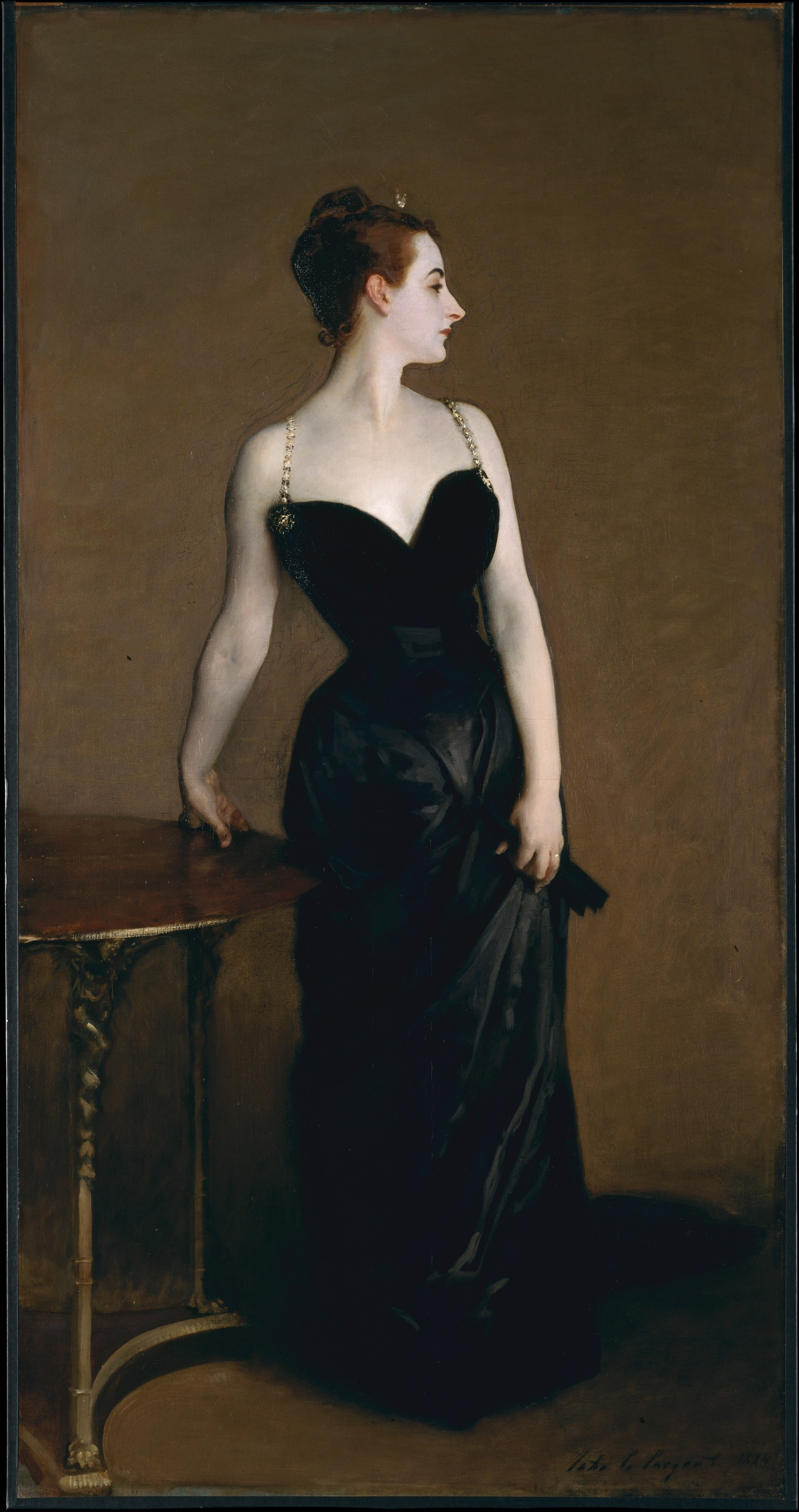
John Singer Sargent, Portrait of Madame X, 1884

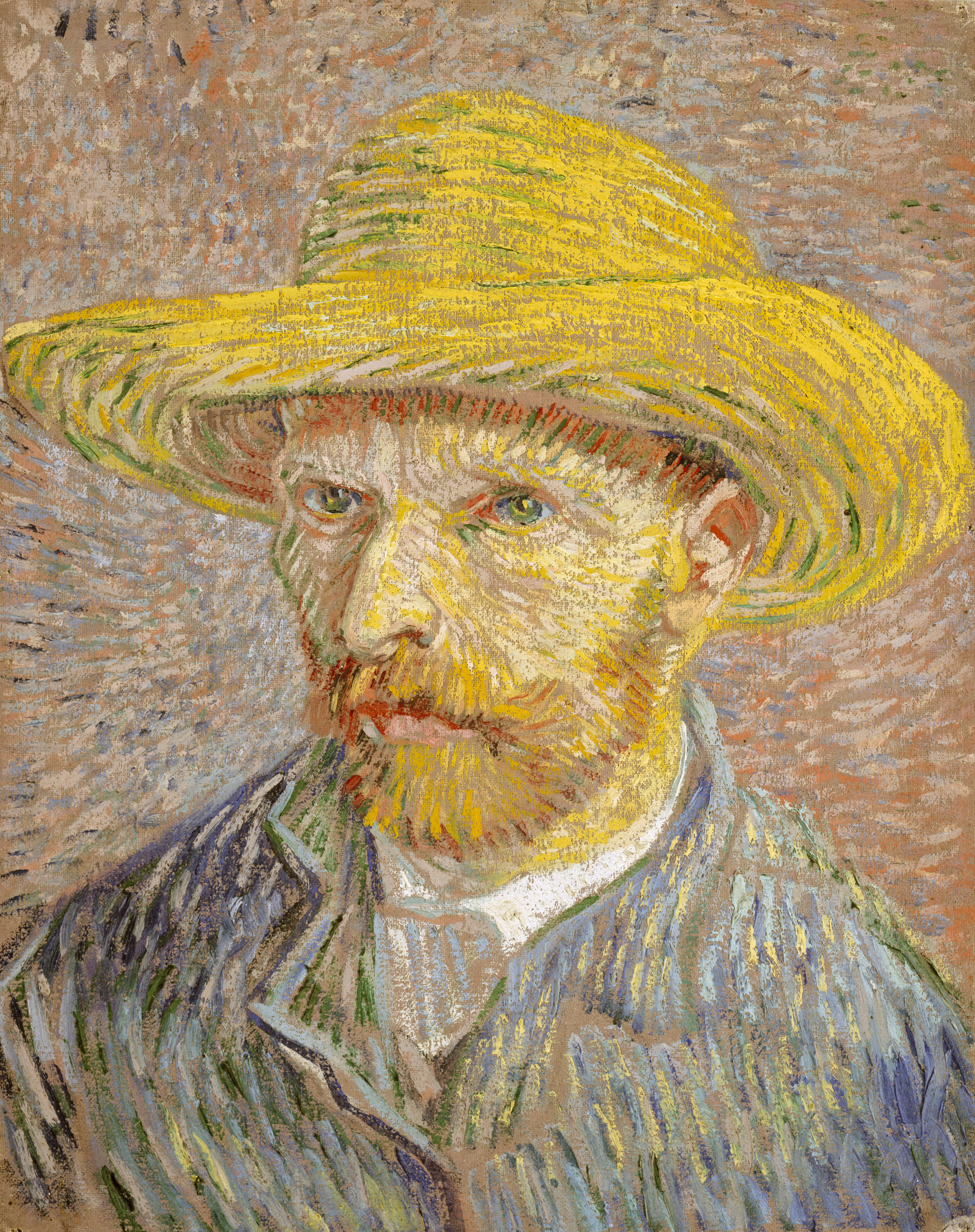
Vincent van Gogh, Self-portrait with Straw Hat, 1887

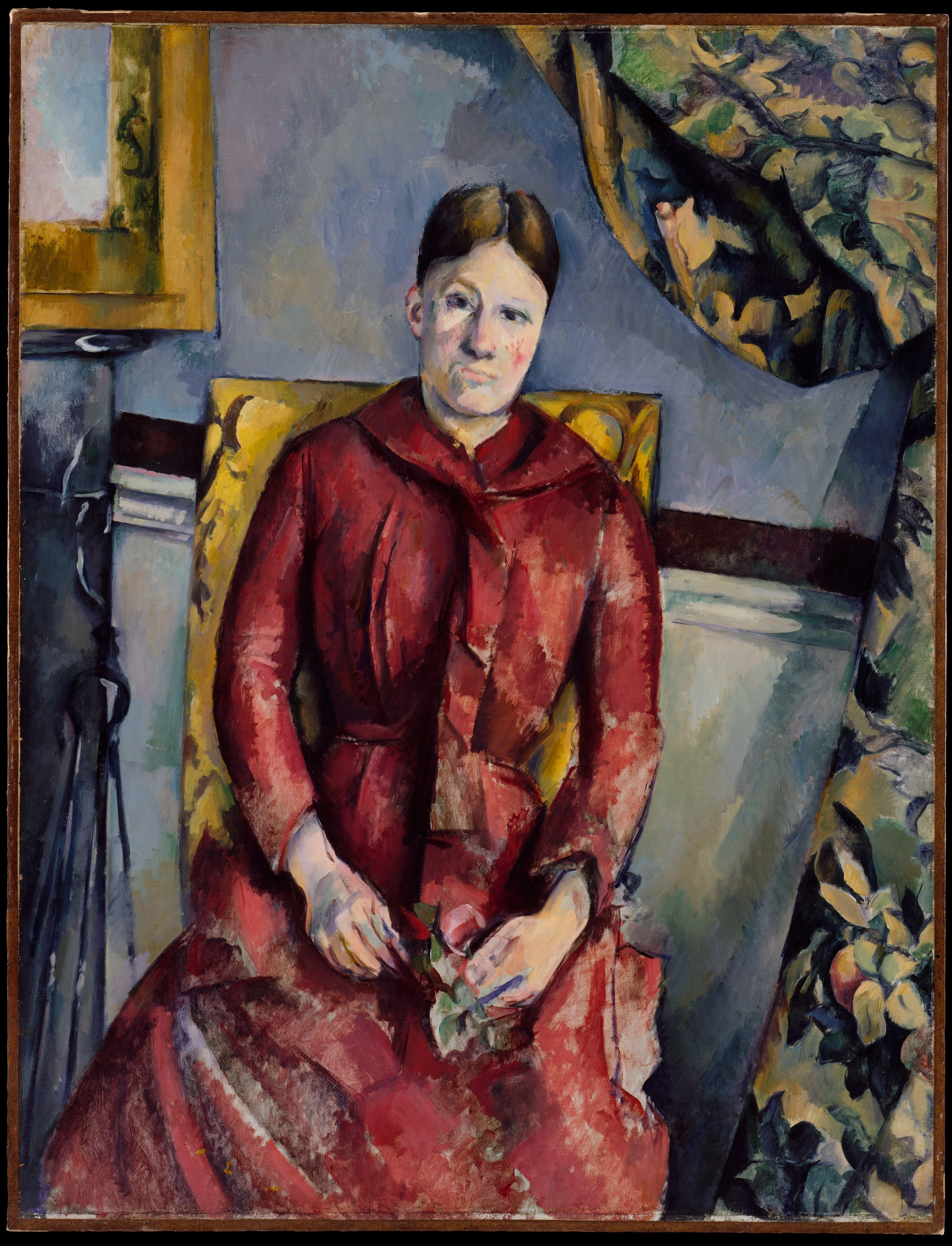
Paul Cézanne, Madame Cézanne (Hortense Fiquet, 1850–1922) in a Red Dress, 1888–90

Pablo Picasso, l'Acteur (The Actor), 1904–05

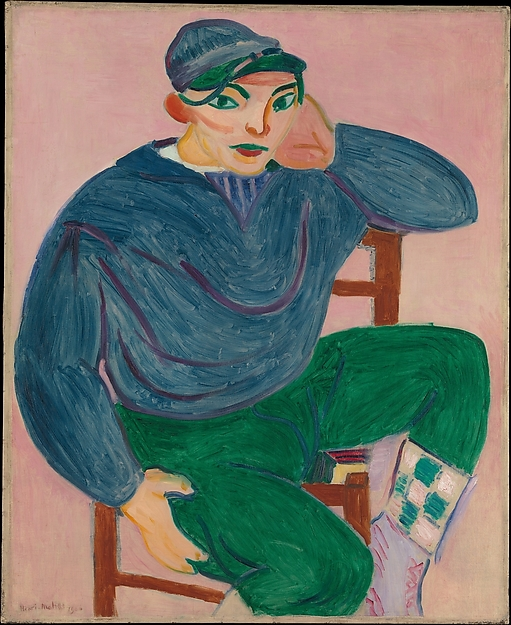
Henri Matisse, The Young Sailor II, 1906

Georges Braque, Still Life with Mandola and Metronome, late 1909

Pablo Picasso, Still Life with a Bottle of Rum, 1911

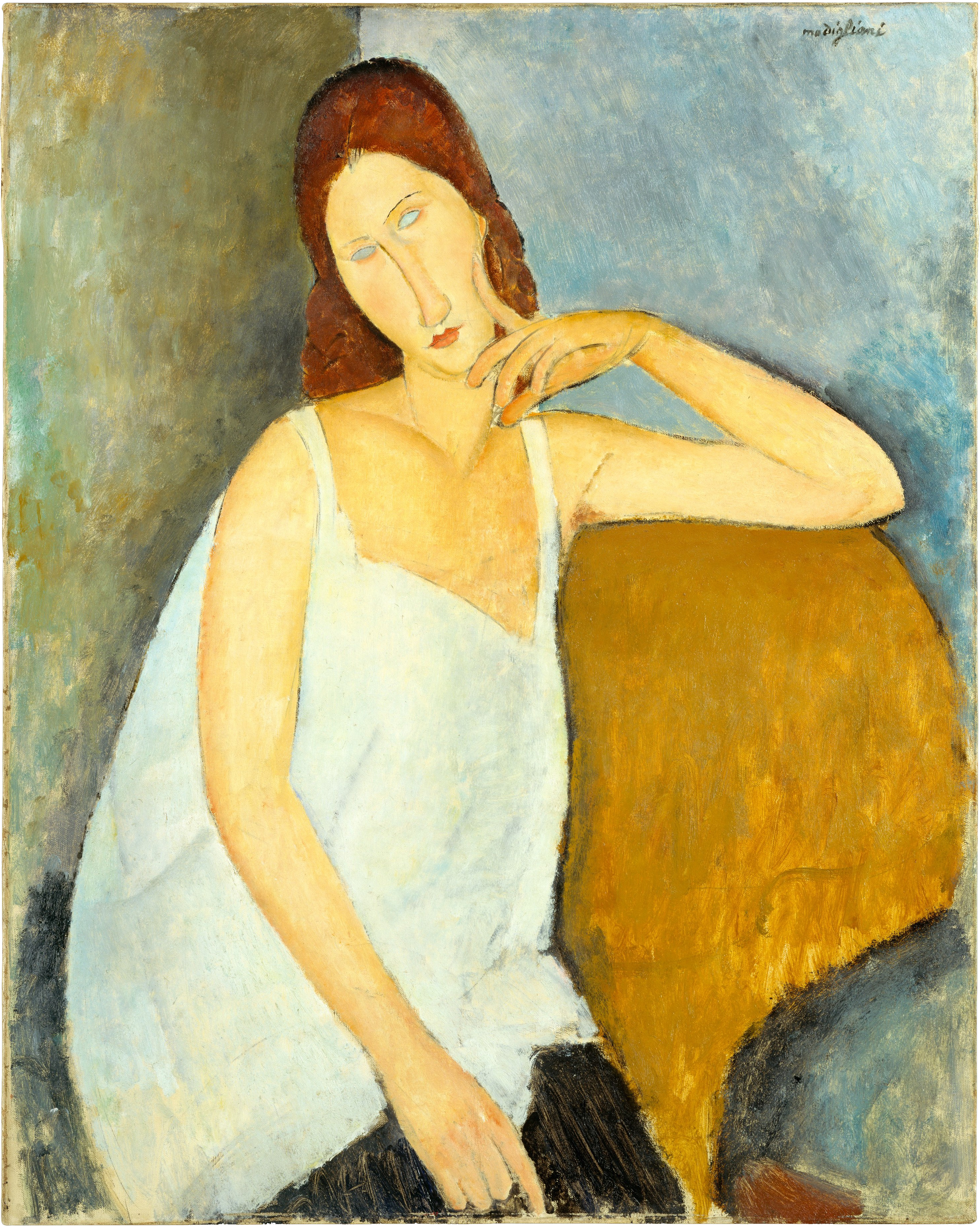
Amedeo Modigliani, Jeanne Hébuterne, 1919

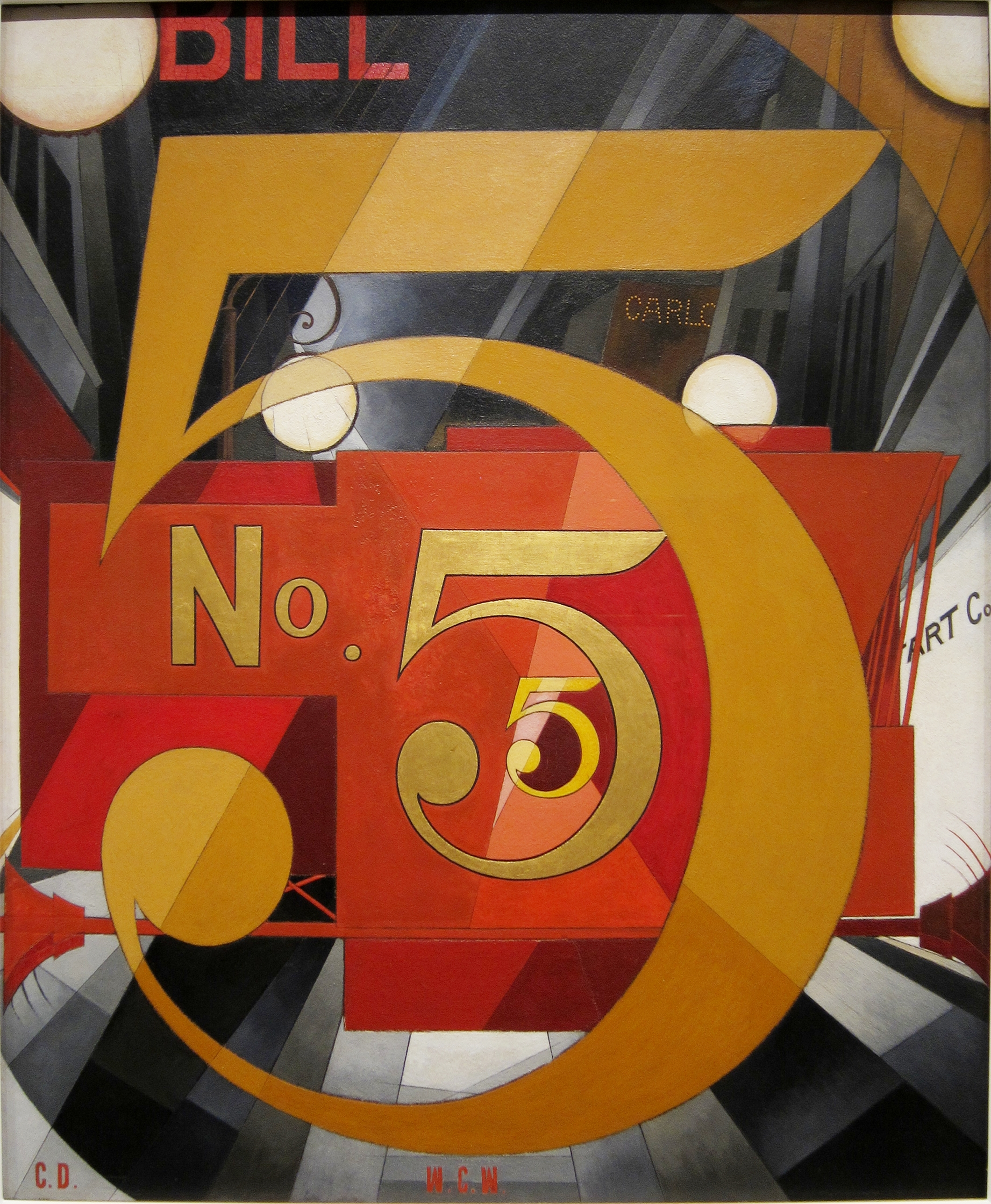
Charles Demuth, I Saw the Figure 5 in Gold, 1928

== See also ==
- List of most-visited art museums
- List of most-visited museums in the United States
