= Moon gate =

Chinese landscape feature

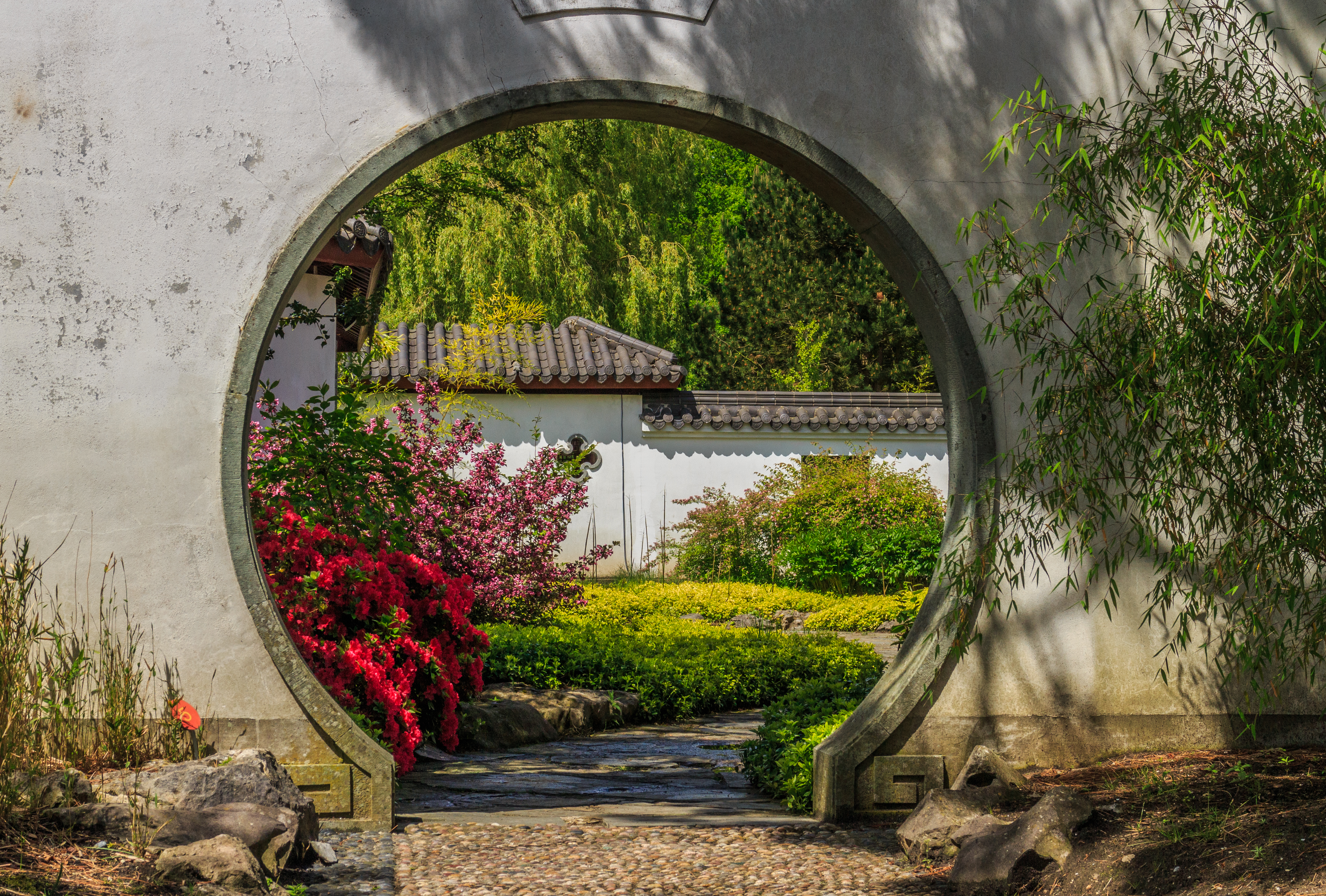
Moon gate at Hortus Haren in the Netherlands

A moon gate (Chinese: 月亮門; pinyin: yuèliàngmén) is a circular opening in a garden wall that acts as a pedestrian passageway. It is a traditional architectural element in Chinese gardens.

The shapes of the gates and their tiles carry various symbolic meanings. The sloping roofs of some gates represent the half moon of the Chinese summer, while the tips of the roof tiles are often adorned with talismanic ornaments.

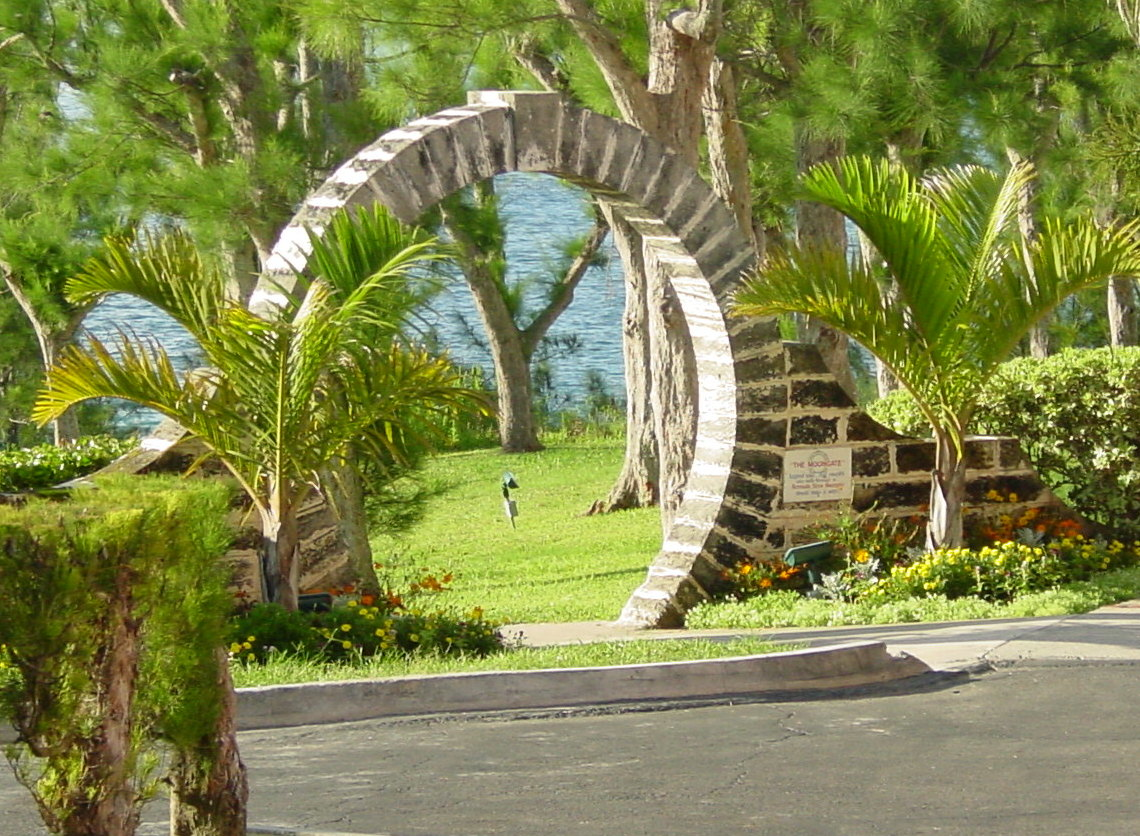
A wall-less moon gate in Bermuda

Moon gates were incorporated into the architecture of Bermuda in the late 19th century, around the same time that the British territory began importing Easter lily bulbs from Japan for cultivation. Bermudan moon gates are slightly different from the original Chinese designs, as they are often left freestanding or attached to a low wall. In Bermuda, it is regarded as good luck for newlyweds to step through the gate.

== Gallery ==
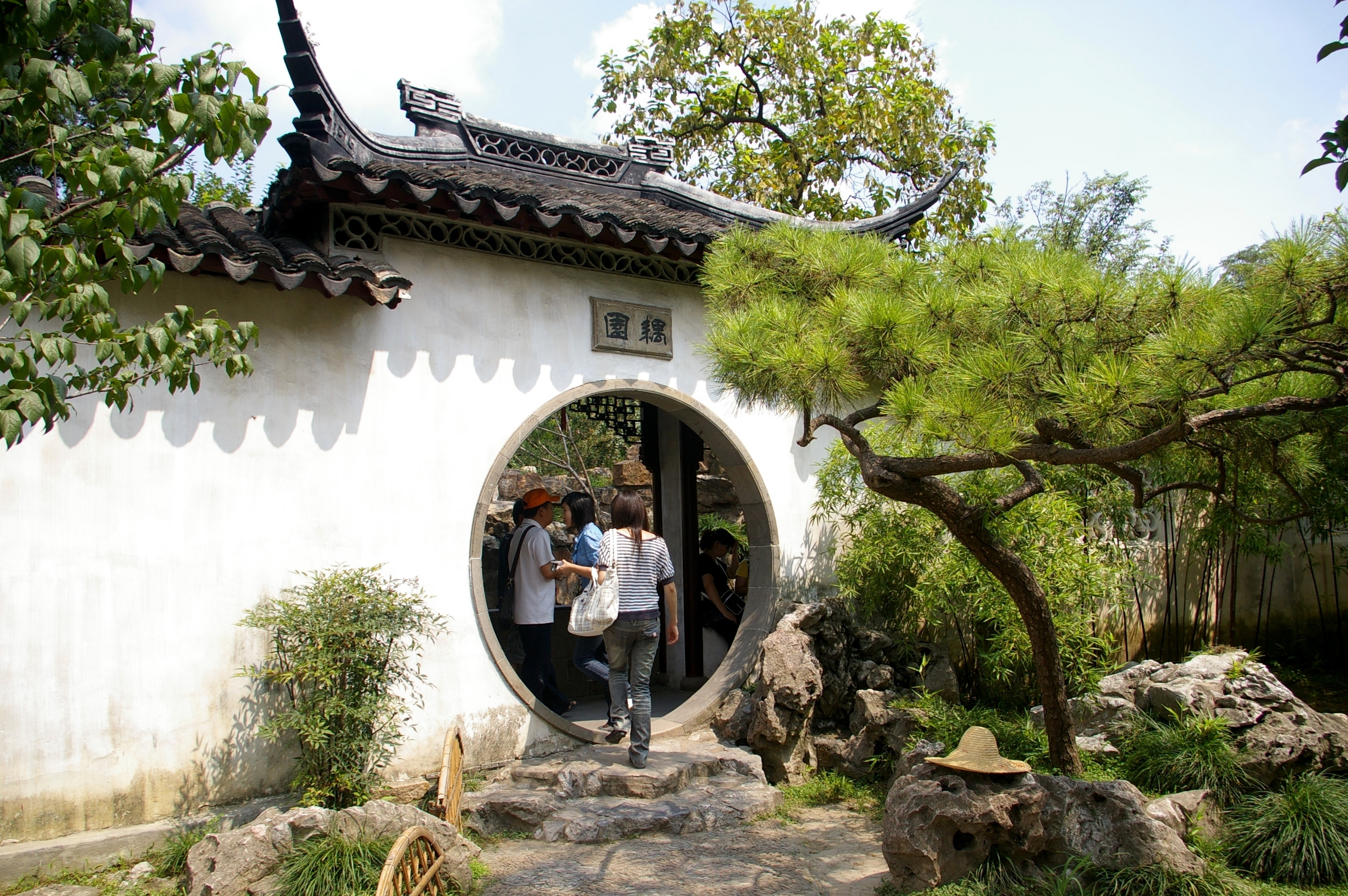
Moon gate at Couple's Retreat Garden in the Classical Gardens of Suzhou

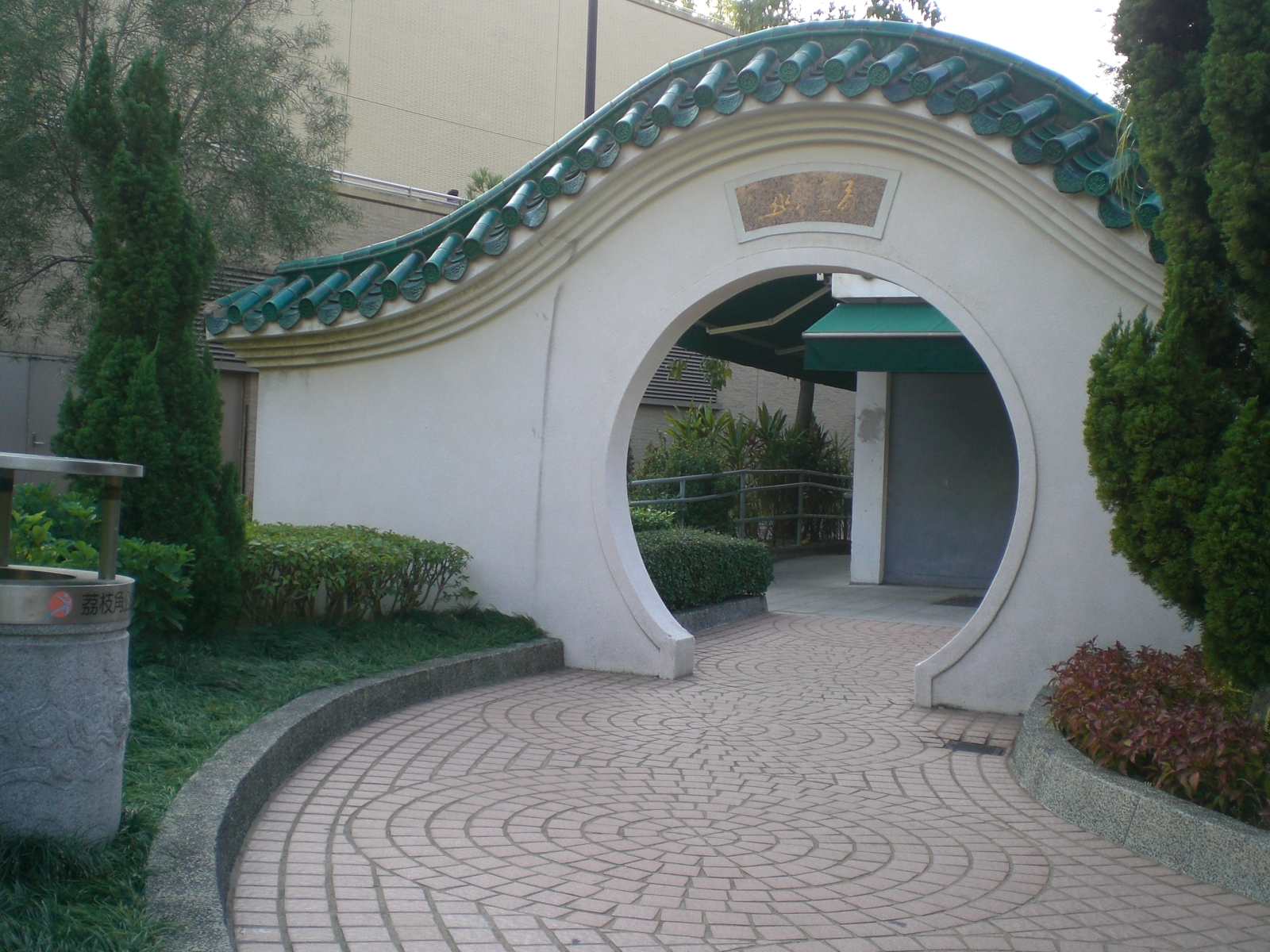
Lai Chi Kok Park Chinese Arch

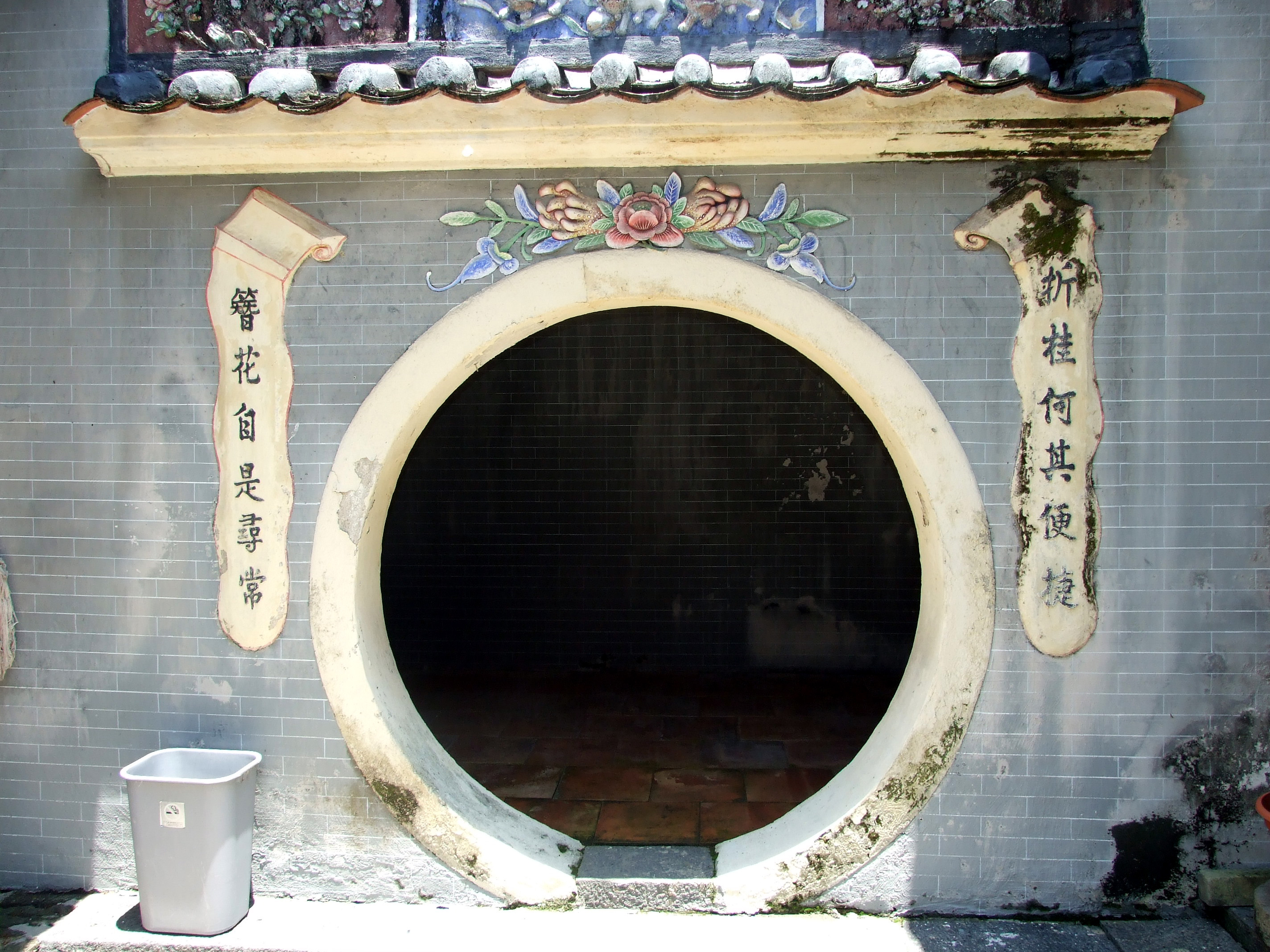
Tong Study Hall moon gate

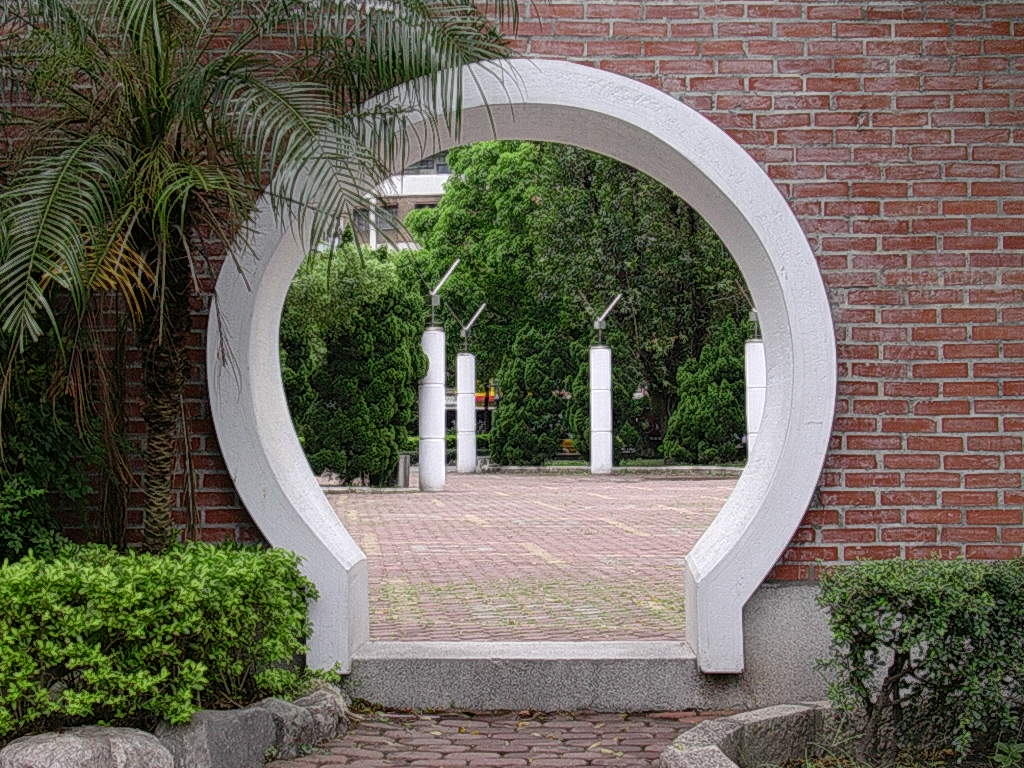
Zhonghe park

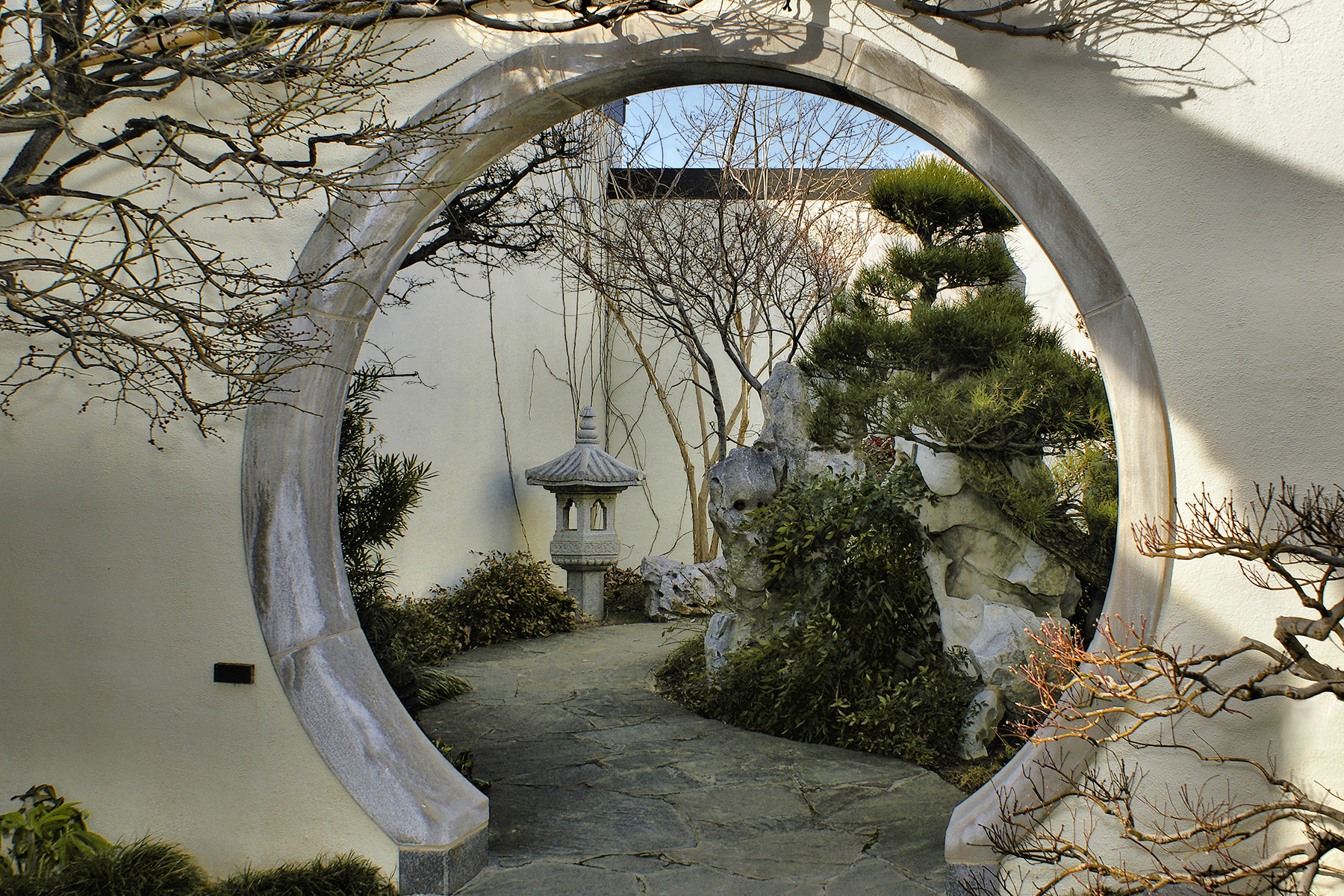
Moon Gate, National Bonsai and Penjing Museum, National Arboretum, Washington, DC

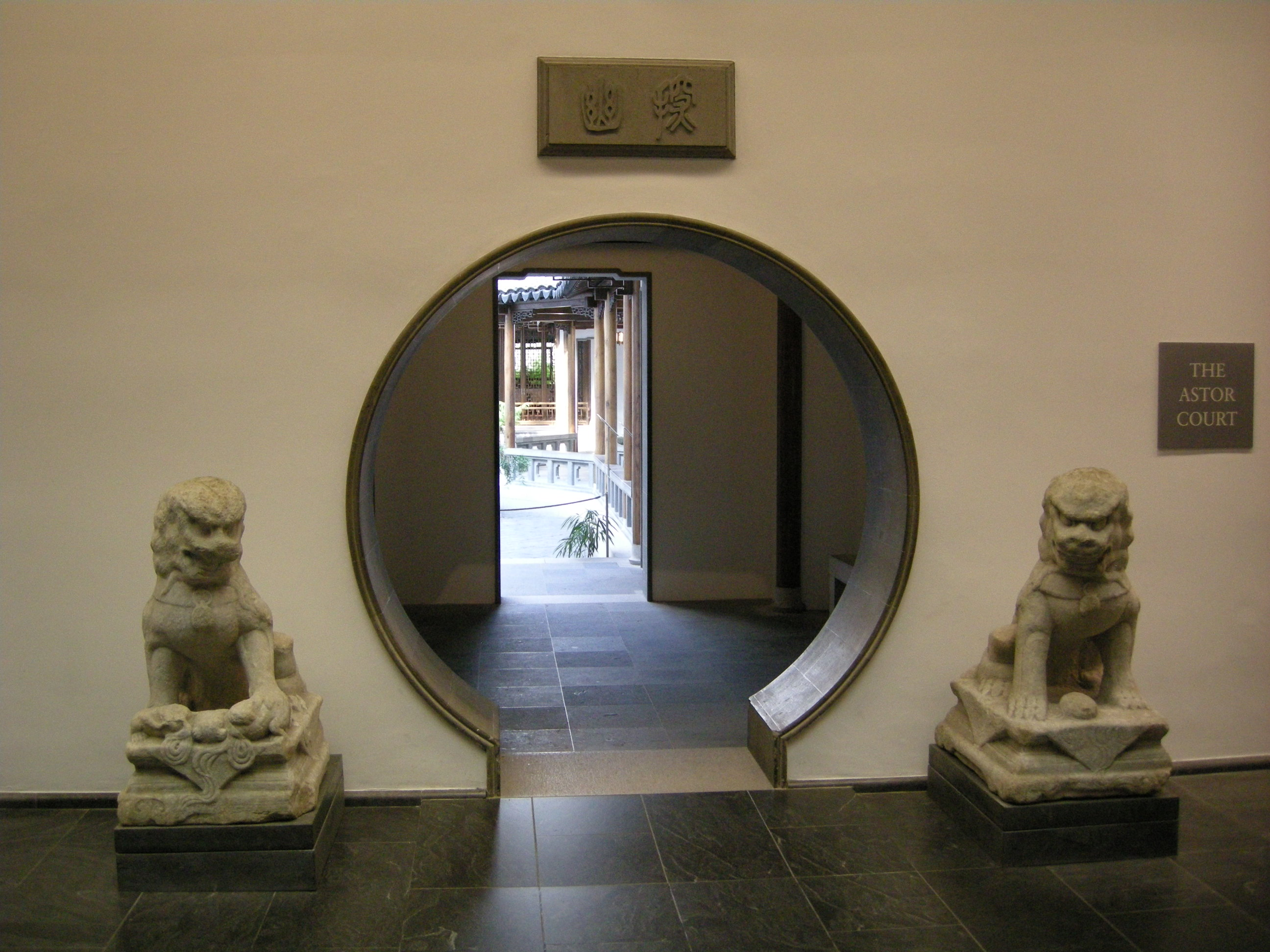
Entrance to the Astor Court, a Ming-style garden at the Metropolitan Museum of Art

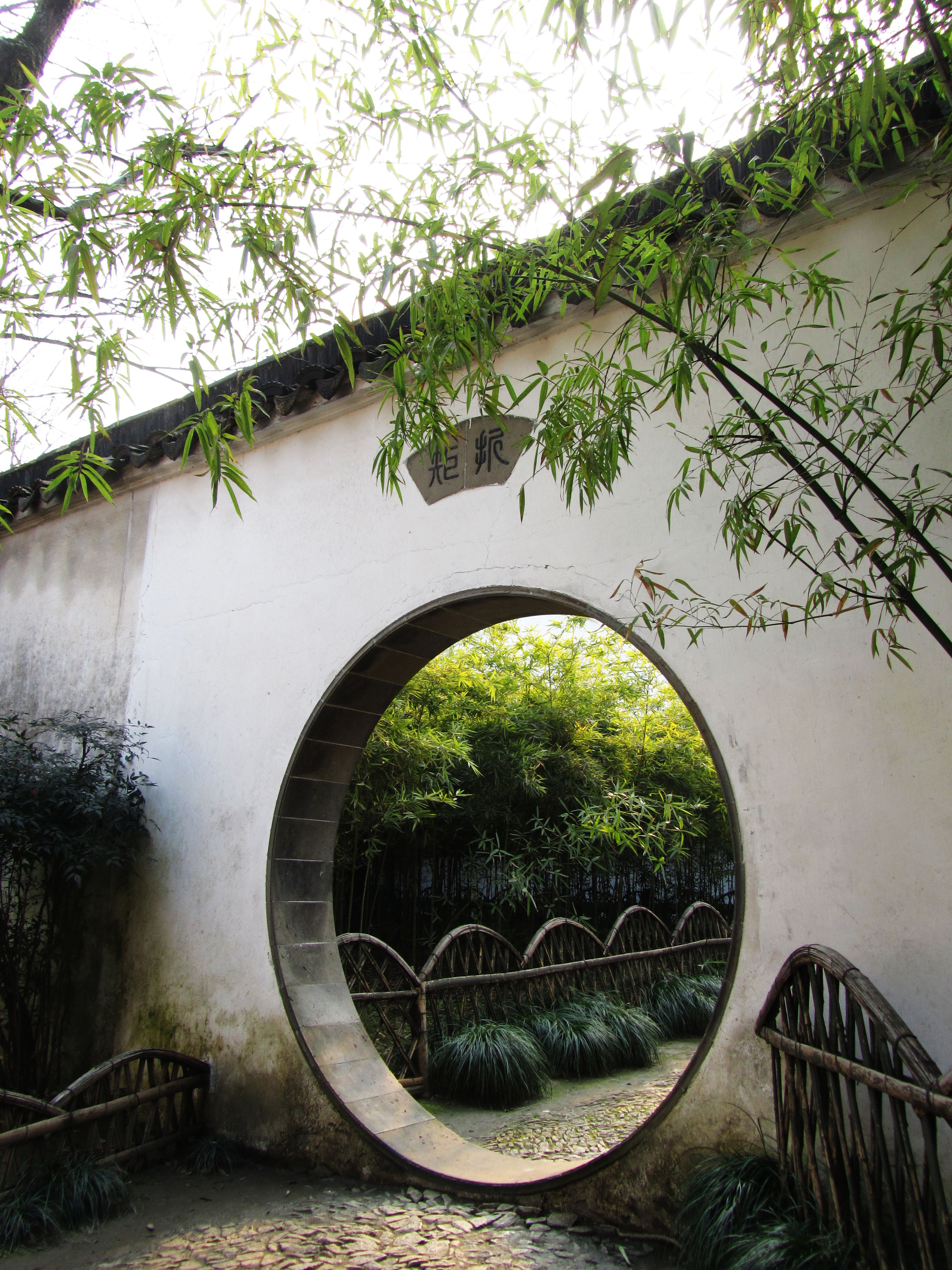
Moon gate in Great Wave Pavilion
