= Hortus Haren =

Botanical garden in Haren, Groningen, Netherlands

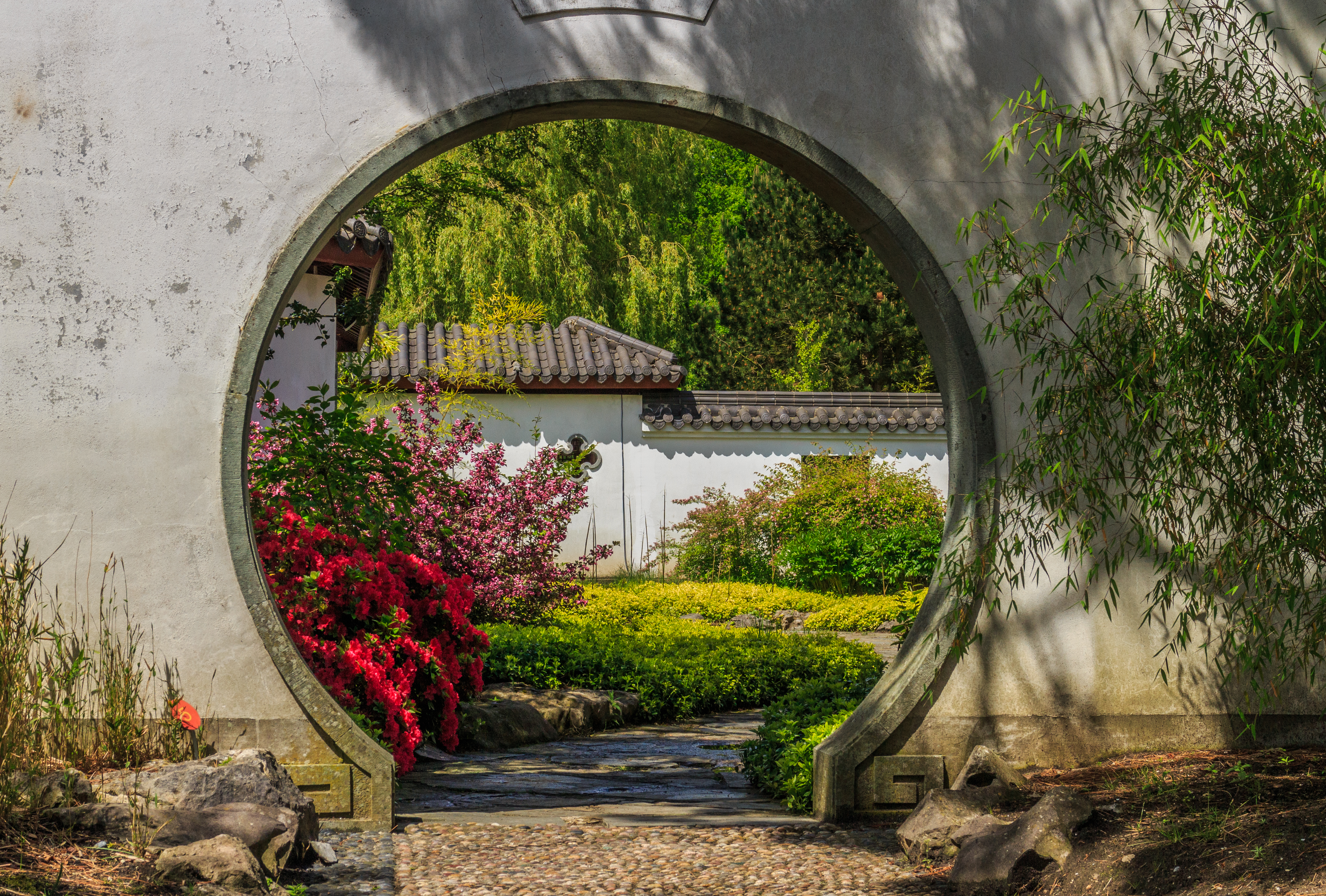
- Moon gate in the Chinese garden

- Location within Netherlands
- Type: Botanical garden
- Location: Haren
- Coordinates: 53°10′46″N 6°36′9″E
- Area: 21 hectares (210,000 m^{2})
- Created: 1626
- Website: http://www.hortusharen.nl

Hortus Haren is a botanical garden in Haren, Groningen, Netherlands. First created in 1626 by the pharmacist Henricus Munting, it was then situated between Grote Rozenstraat and Grote Kruisstraat in Groningen. Because of space considerations it relocated to Haren in 1967 and became the largest botanical garden in the country.

== Gallery ==
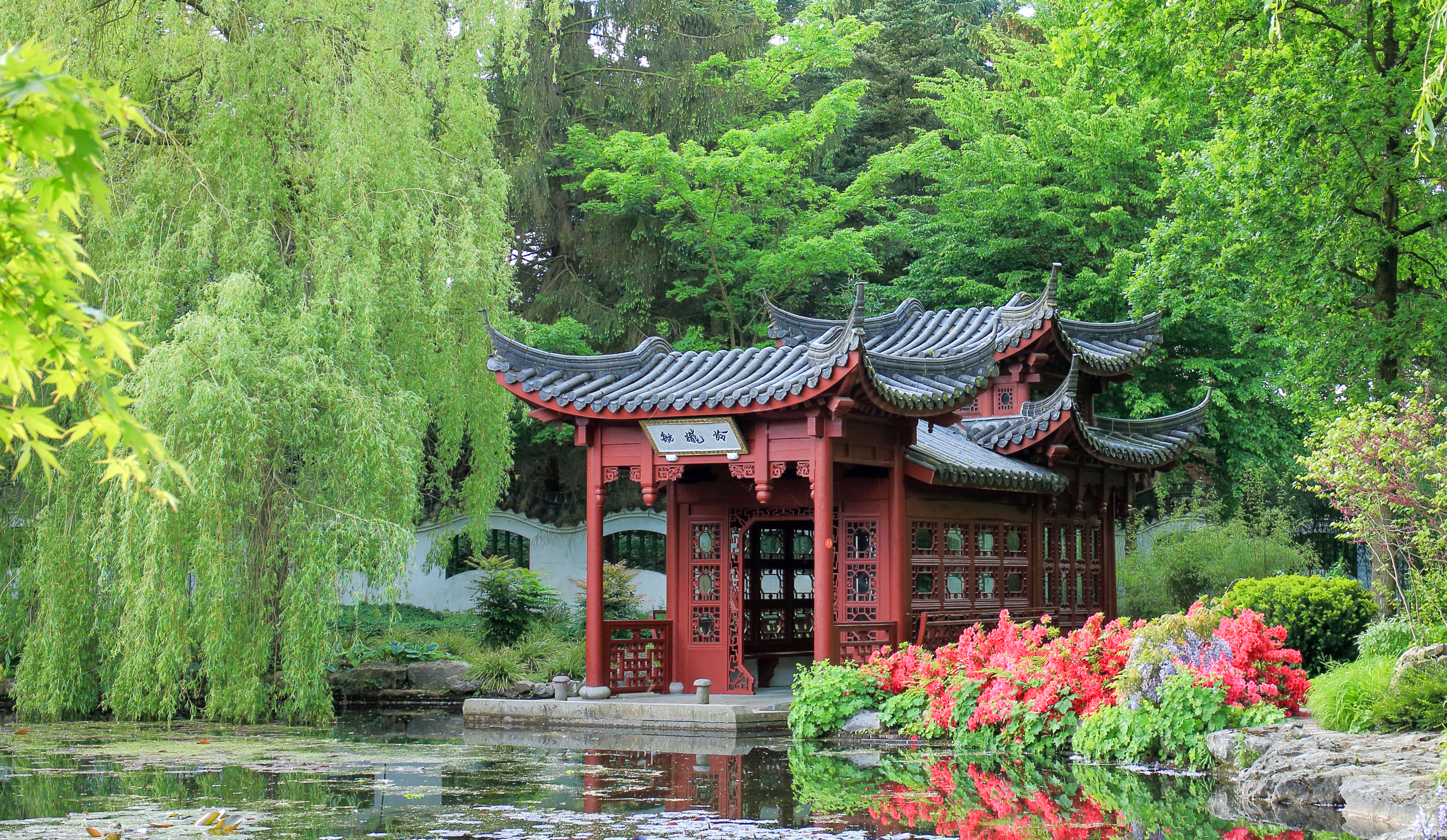
Building depicting a boat in the Chinese garden of the Hidden Realm of Ming pavilion.

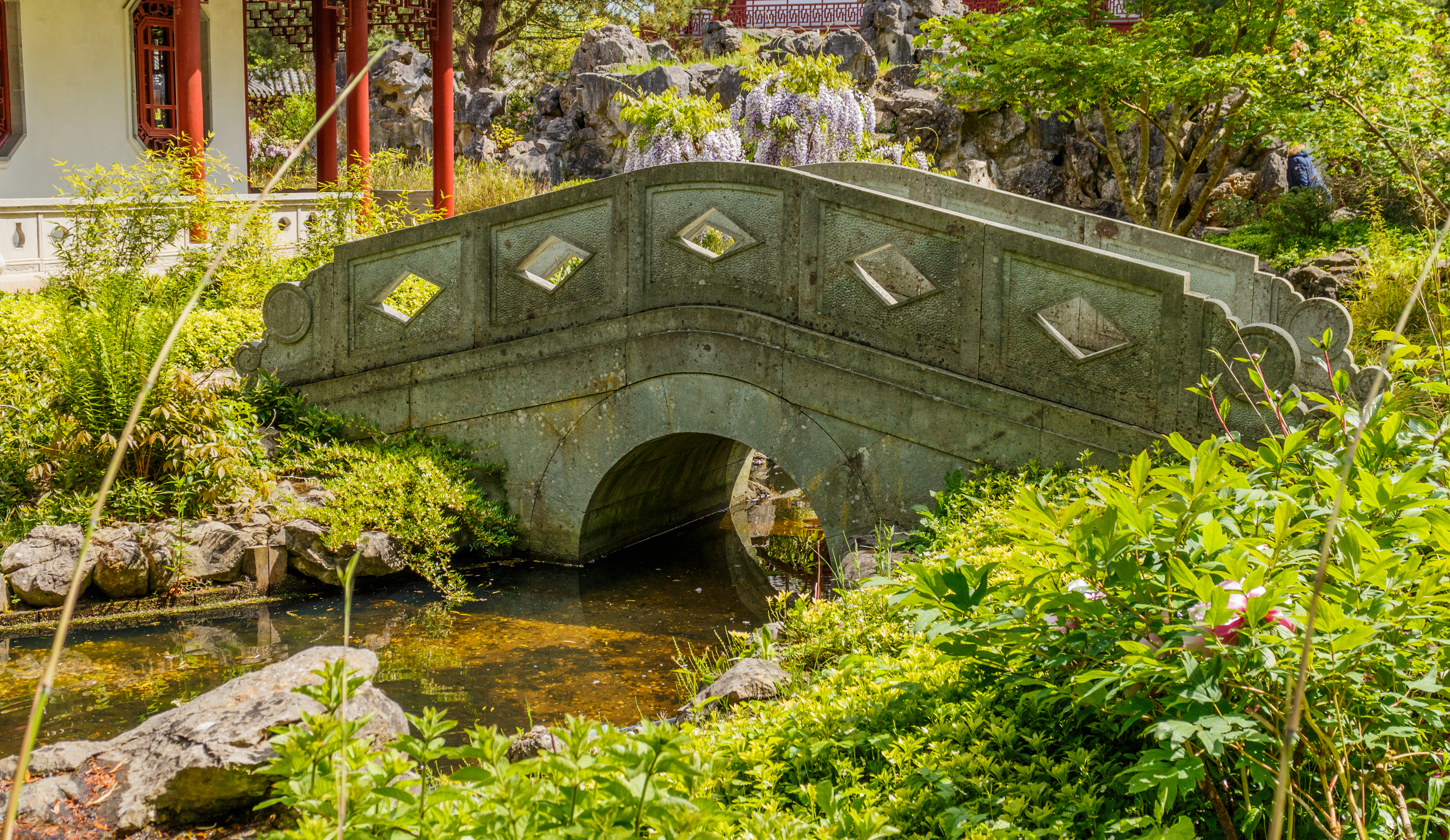
Bridge in the Chinese garden.

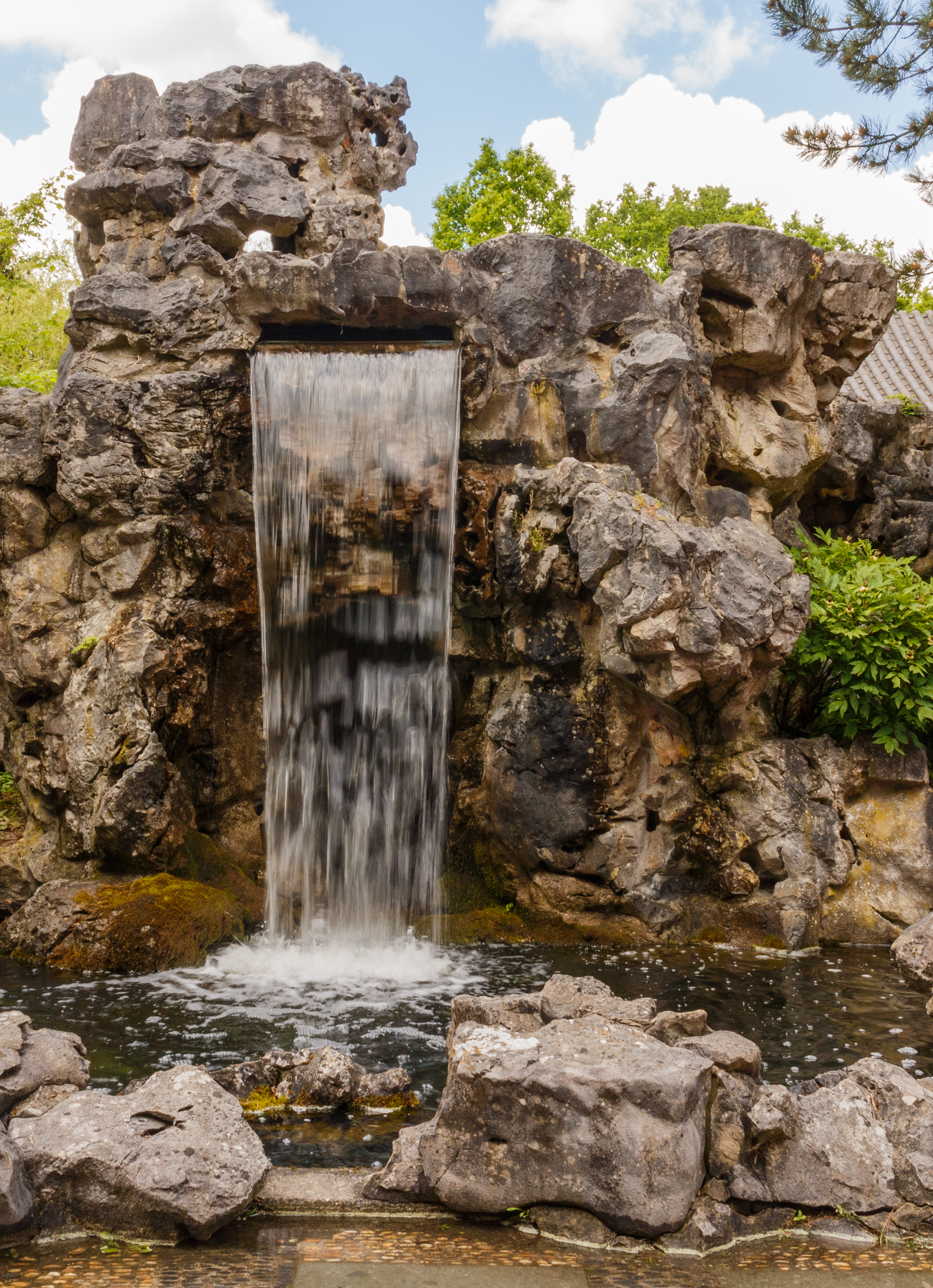
Waterfall in the Chinese garden.

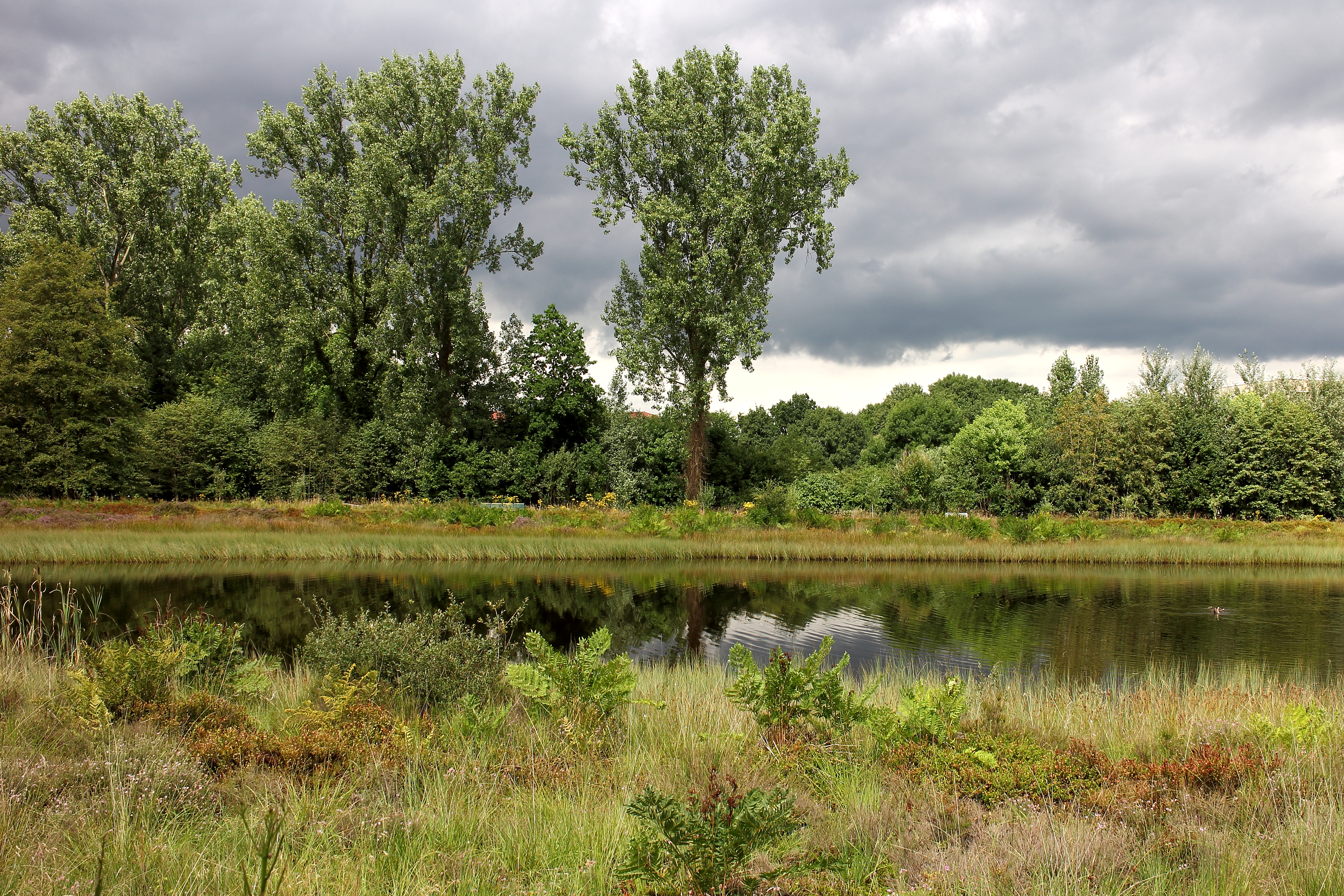
Lake in the Hortus Haren (Voedselarme plas).

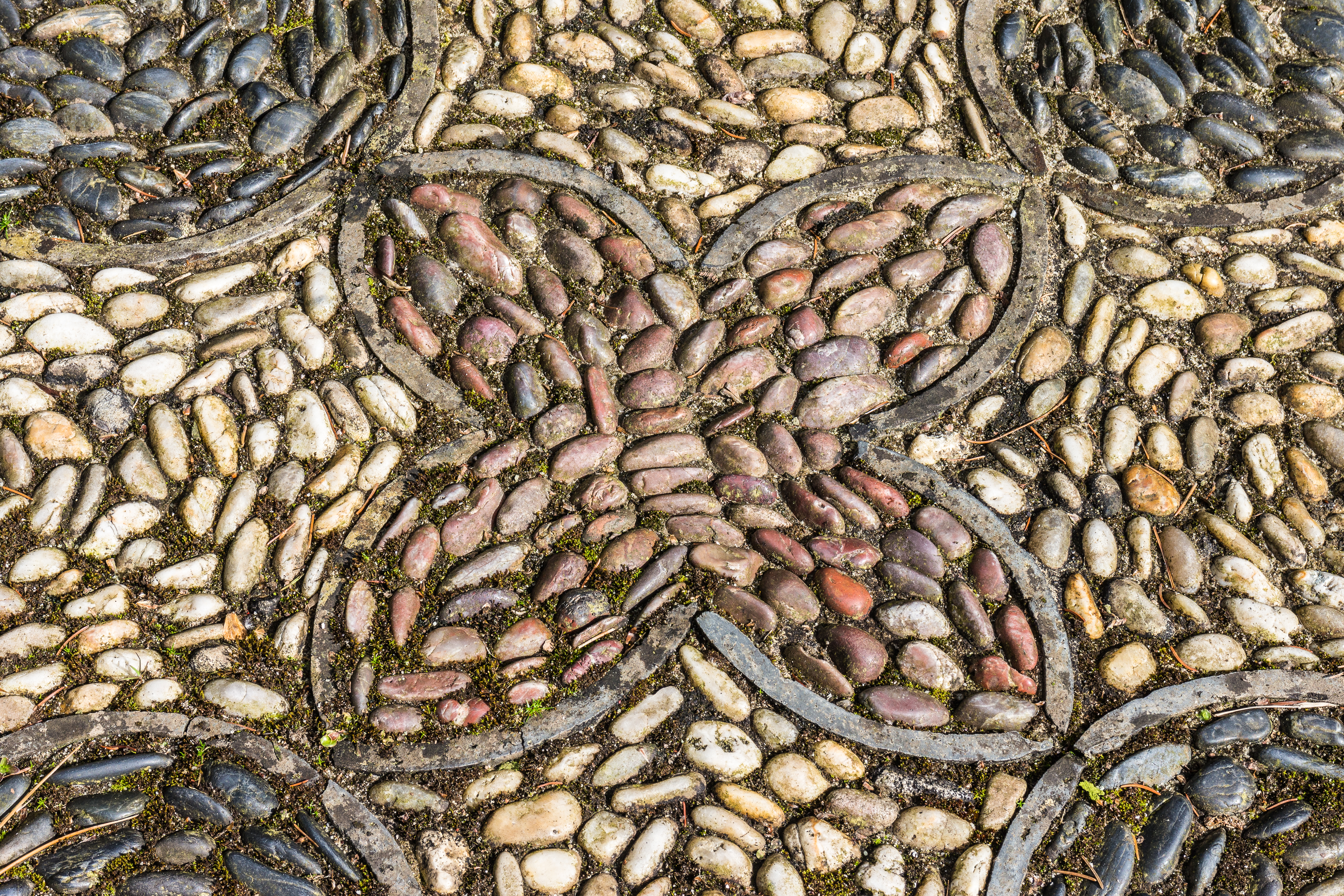
Chinese Garden The Hidden Empire Ming, mosaic pavement courtyard.

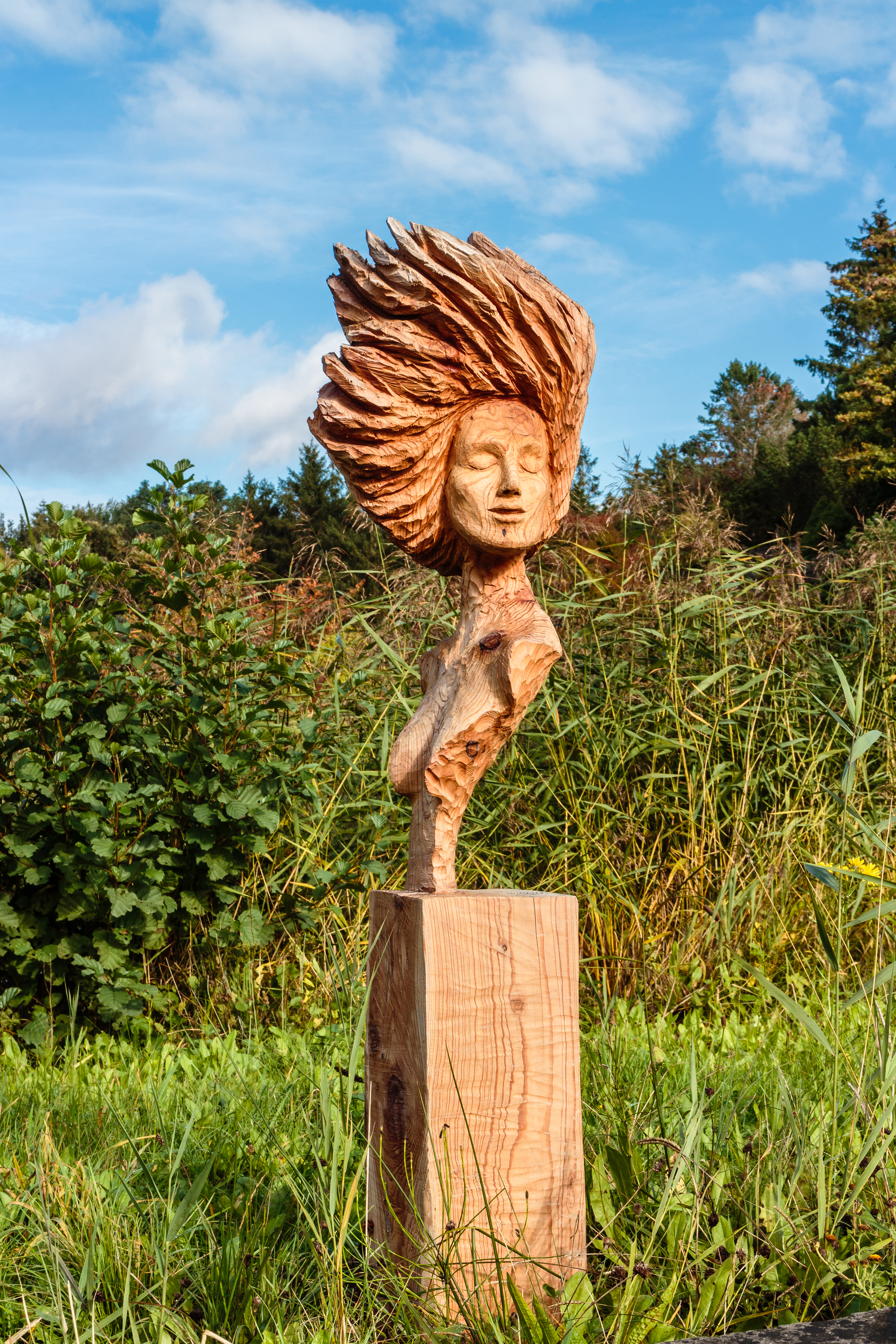
‘In The Wind’. Artwork by Jeroen Boersma. Wikimedia Commons Picture of the Day, 21 September 2022
