= Astor Court (Metropolitan Museum of Art) =

Chinese-garden courtyard in New York City

Coordinates: 40.779°N 73.963°W

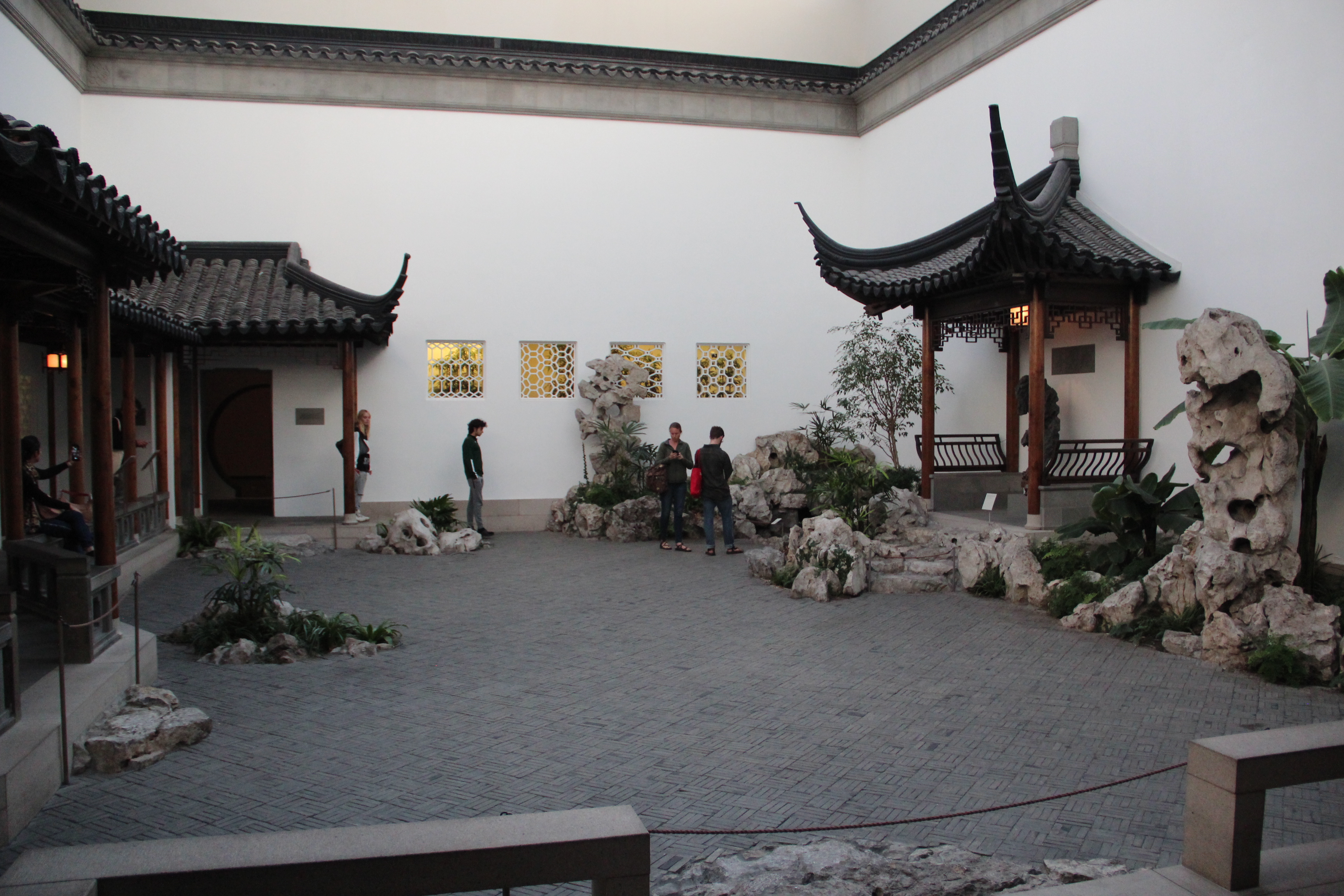
The Astor Court

The Astor Court, located in the Metropolitan Museum of Art in New York City, is a re-creation of a Ming dynasty-style, Chinese-garden courtyard. It is also known as the Ming Hall (明軒).

The first permanent cultural exchange between the U.S. and the People's Republic of China, the installation was completed in 1981. Conceived by museum trustee Brooke Astor, the courtyard was created and assembled by expert craftsmen from China using traditional methods, materials and hand tools.

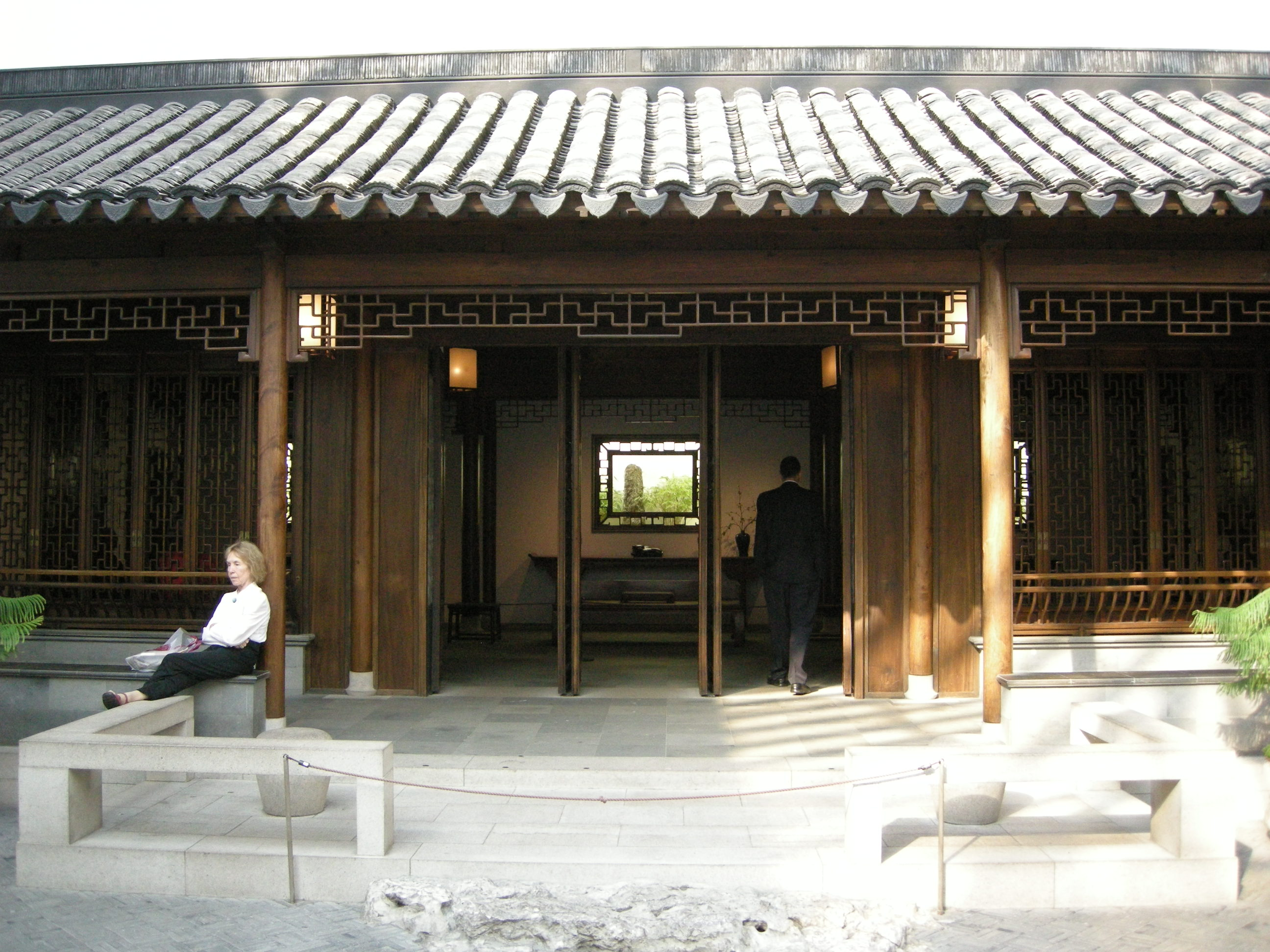

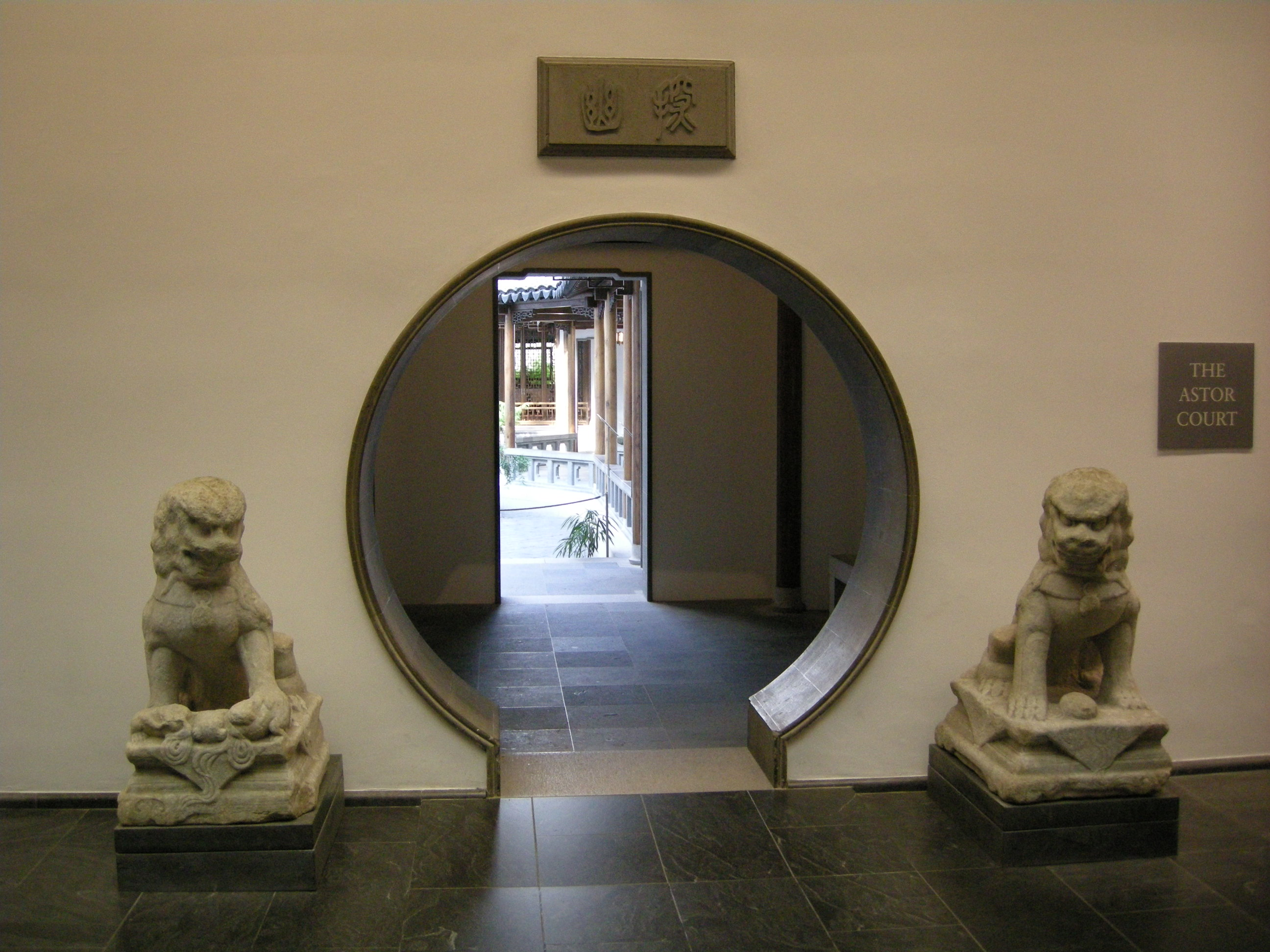
Moon gate entrance

== Origin ==
The design of the museum's Chinese garden is "based on a small courtyard within a scholar's garden in the city of Suzhou, China, called Wang Shi Yuan, the Garden of the Master of the Fishing Nets." Statements by officials of the museum credit Astor with the idea for the installation, stating that she recalled such gardens from a period of her childhood spent in Beijing, China, "and thought that such a court would be ideal as the focal point for the permanent installation of Far Eastern art." The museum had purchased a collection of Ming Dynasty domestic furniture in 1976 with funds in part from the Vincent Astor Foundation. The hall adjacent to the courtyard and architecturally unified with it was created to provide a suitable space to display this collection.

In 1977, Wen Fong, Special Consultant for Far East Affairs at the Metropolitan Museum and a professor at Princeton University, went to China and visited gardens in Suzhou with Professor Chen Congzhou, an architectural historian from Tongji University. It was their decision that the Late Spring Studio courtyard (Dian Chun Yi), a small part of the Garden of the Master of the Nets, should provide the basis of the museum's installation, for several reasons. The measurements of the small court were appropriate to the area the museum had in mind. Furthermore, its basic plan seemed to be relatively unchanged from its original construction as suggested by its "utter simplicity and harmonious proportions". Artist and stage designer Ming Cho Lee, working from various architectural sketches and photographs, created drawings and a model for the Astor Court which was shared with the Suzhou Garden Administration. Suzhou officials responded positively and offered a number of modifications, and offered photographs of Taihu rocks they proposed be part of the design, and by the end of 1978 an agreement was signed for the project.

In China, construction began on a permanent prototype that will remain in Suzhou. China granted special permission to log nan trees for the wooden pillars that are central to the architecture. Nan, which is related to cedar, was driven close to extinction during the Qing Dynasty, and is only used in exceptional constructions such as the Memorial Hall of Mao Zedong. Another critical element of the construction of a Chinese court is tile, and to meet the requirement of the project an old imperial kiln was reopened. Each ceiling and floor tile was made by hand — or rather by foot, as the clay was pressed into frames by the workers' feet. The wood and ceramic materials and elements were crafted in China and shipped to New York City, where assembly began in January 1980.

== Installation ==
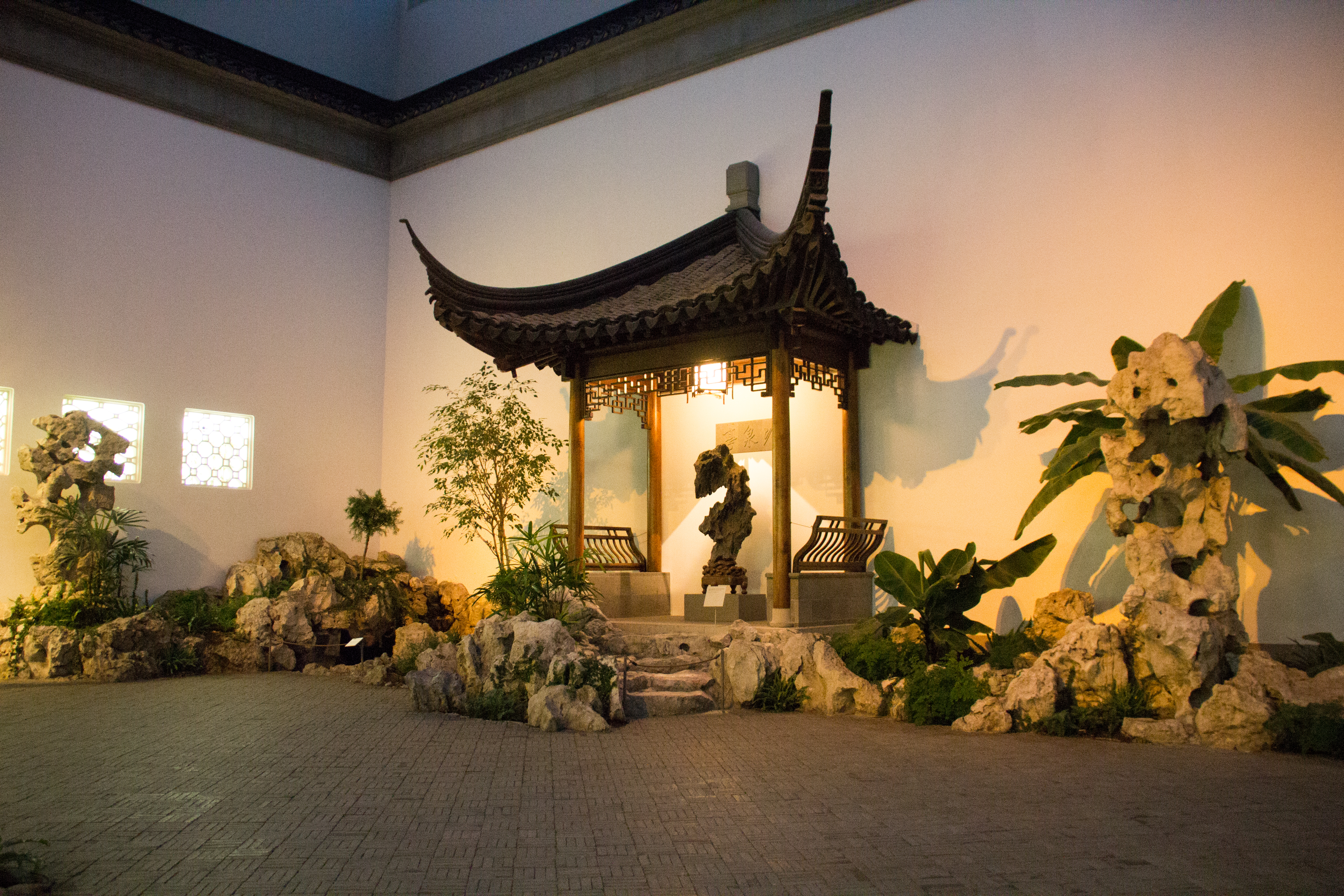
Astor Court illuminated in the evening

The process of assembly required special arrangements with the AFL–CIO—a national trade union center—and the multinational crew which carried out the work wore hardhats emblazoned with both Chinese and American flags. The American contribution was limited to preparing the modern infrastructure of ducts and circuitry, staining the wood, plastering, and painting; all other work was performed by a team of twenty-seven from the Suzchou Garden Administration. The workers included carpenters, tile workers, masons, and rock experts. Most of the fabrication had been done in China and the pieces were numbered for assembly. The wood structures rely on mortise-and-tenon and mitering techniques of joinery as old as the fourth century BC, and of uncommon sophistication; one pillar is joined to over fifteen architectural members without nails, and secured with wood pins with just a firm tap of a mallet for added stability. It sits on a stone plinth without additional anchor. Fundamentally similar woodworking methods are used for furniture and traditional buildings, terms for which translate essentially as "small woodwork" and "large woodwork". The prepared joinery pieces were quickly assembled. "The entire frame of pillars and beams for the Ming Room, for instance, went up in several days, and with amazing precision. The woodworkers, using a frame handsaw and bow hand drill, were more like cabinetmakers than carpenters."

Stone and masonry work took longer. The grey terra-cotta floor tiles, which are laid on edge in groups of four (a pattern called jian fang) on a bed of packed sand, and held with a hand-mixed mastic of ground lime, bamboo, and tung oil. Hand saws were used in shaping tiles around pillars. The colonnade is edged by a low railing of hand-polished terra-cotta tiles. The work of dressing, finishing, and assembling, was completed in less than five months. The Astor Court opened in June 1980.

== Features ==
The Astor Court's primary egress is through a circular "moon gate" which leads, as in the original Late Spring Studio courtyard, to a covered zigzag walkway running along a wall. The walls have backlighted windows which are elaborately latticed with designs from a 1634 garden manual; they frame bamboo plantings that offer a suggestion of space extending beyond. The Astor Court follows "a simple plan in keeping with the Yin-Yang principle of alternation. Similar elements, such as plaster walls, wood structures, or rocks, do not face each other. Viewed from outside the entrance at the south end, a circular moon gate frames a rectangular doorway, through which successive spaces defined by colonnades and an alternating pattern of light and dark may be seen."

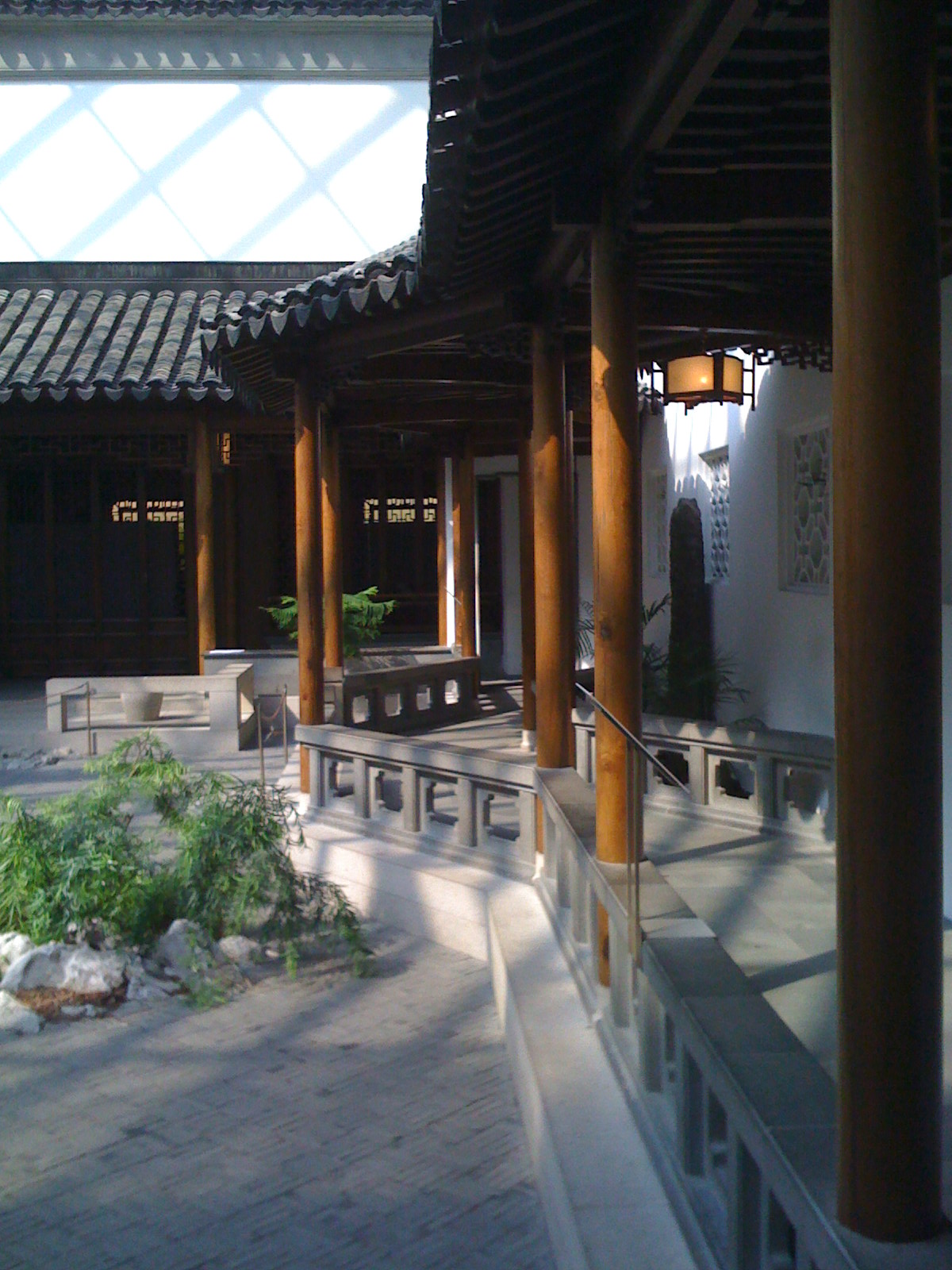

The Courtyard floor of grey tiles is punctuated with Taihu rocks, plantings, and a small water feature intended to evoke the spring of the original. Across the courtyard, accessed from the middle of the colonnade down a step framed by two stone pillars from an old garden, is a half-pavilion, with carved wood benches and upturned eaves. The colonnade ends at the "Moon-viewing terrace" in front of the Ming Hall with its period Ming Dynasty furniture.

These three elements—winding walkway, open pavilion, and a hall or room—are typical features of Chinese garden designs. The entire space is covered by a pyramidal skylight designed by the consulting architects Kevin Roche and John Dinkeloo, using materials consistent with the museum's glass-curtain-wall extensions since the 1970s.

Details in the architectural elements can be easily missed, but amplify the Chinese sensibility that informs the design. For example, the court has several examples of Chinese wordplay. The colonnade jogs around a taihu rock called a "bamboo shoot" for its tall, narrow shape. This is a "visual pun on the surrounding live bamboo." The roof tiles, whose soft black tone is the result of firing with rice husks followed by a water bath while still warm, are fronted with stylized characters for "bat" (fu) which sounds like a word meaning happiness or good fortune, along with lu meaning wealth and shou meaning long life—the three happinesses of an authentic Ming design. The eaves of the half-pavilion are in the Suzhou style of radically upturned eaves, constructed in the style which has been translated as "spear boosted by a secondary spear" which is sometimes said to evoke a phoenix about to ascend. This is a style of northern China which allows more sun to be admitted to the interior than the deep overhangs more favored in the south.

The court includes elaborate compositions of rocks. One large rock, part of a configuration salvaged from an abandoned garden near Tiger Hill at the edge of Suzhou, resembles a famous one in the Lion Grove Garden in Suzhou, and illustrates an important quality of rock aesthetic, that the base should be narrower than the peak. Another tall rock, the ling-long peak, illustrates the much-prized "bony" and perforated quality of taihu rocks, which suggest lightness in spite of their massive weight. Such rocks have many-faceted meanings in Chinese culture. Viewers are thought to be able to imagine themselves travelling a mental journey through the miniature landscape that the rocks evoke.

== Chinese crews in New York ==
At the time of the installation in 1980, not long after the improvement of relations between the U.S. and China, the artisans and workers from the People's Republic of China attracted popular attention in New York. The museum commissioned filmmaker Gene Searchinger and staff communications specialist Thomas Newman to record the process of installation, and their award-winning documentary, Ming Garden, written and partially narrated by museum curator Alfreda Murck, suggests the human dimension of what was a geopolitical watershed moment. The American foreman, Joseph DiGiacomo, is prominently quoted in the film, discussing "the mutual respect that developed between the American and Chinese workers. The interactions between the Chinese and American crews are more than merely amusing sidelights: they reveal how regard for craftsmanship helps to hurdle barriers of language and culture." Most of the crews, some of whom were in their 70s, had never traveled far from Suzhou and none except one translator spoke English. Asked by a reporter if there had been any ideological debates between the U.S. and Chinese workers, the American foreman replied, "How could there be? As it is, it takes us an hour to understand what they are asking us to do. But what old-time work; it really impresses you." The Chinese assigned a chef to the team, who prepared the workers' meals of Suzhou "home cooking" to keep them from homesickness.

== In popular culture ==
In Jonathan Lethem's book, Chronic City (2009), the protagonist meets another character in the Astor Court, and, separately, another character mentions having shared a kiss there.
