= Master of the Nets Garden =

The Master-of-Nets Garden
UNESCO World Heritage Site
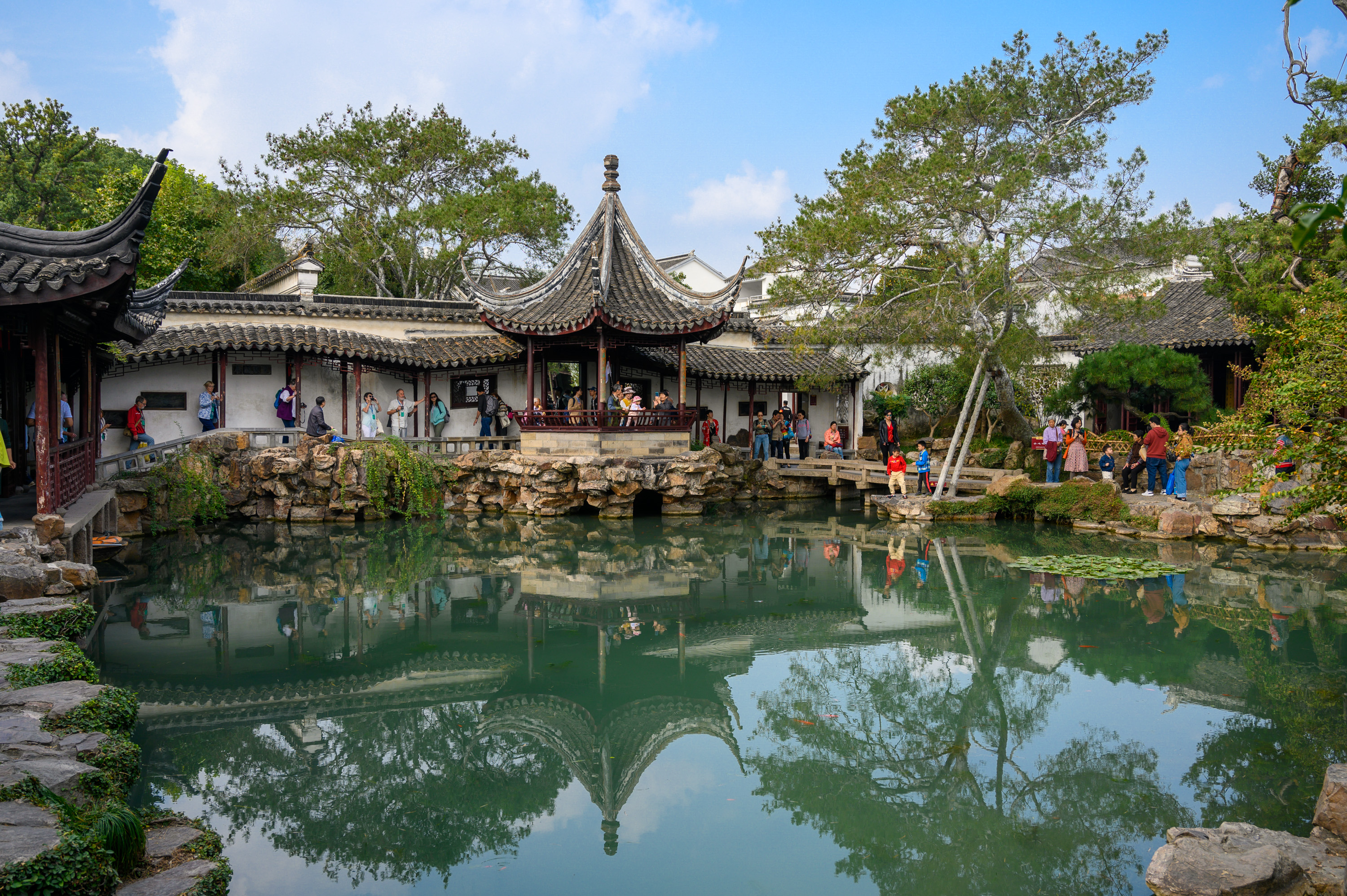

- Location within Jiangsu Location within China
- Location: Suzhou, Jiangsu, China
- Part of: Classical Gardens of Suzhou
- Criteria: Cultural: (i)(ii)(iii)(iv)(v)
- Reference: 813bis-003
- Inscription: 1997 (21st Session)
- Extensions: 2000
- Area: 0.54 ha (1.3 acres)
- Coordinates: 31°18′01.20″N 120°37′47.60″E

Master of the Nets Garden
- "Master of the Nets Garden" in Simplified (top) and Traditional (bottom) Chinese
- Simplified Chinese: 网师园
- Traditional Chinese: 網師園
Transcriptions
Standard Mandarin
- Hanyu Pinyin: Wǎngshī yuán
- IPA: [wàŋ.ʂɨ́ ɥɛ̌n]
Wu
- Suzhounese: maon^{6} sy^{1} yoe^{2} [mɑ̃ sz ɦyø]
Yue: Cantonese
- Yale Romanization: Móhng-sī yùhn
- Jyutping: Mong5-si1 jyun4
- IPA: [mɔŋ˩˧.si˥ jyn˩]
Southern Min
- Tâi-lô: Bāng-su hn̂g

The Master of the Nets Garden (Chinese: 网师园; pinyin: Wǎngshī yuán; Suzhouese, Wugniu: maon^{6} sy^{1} yoe^{2} Wu Chinese pronunciation: [mɑ̃ sz̩ ɦyø]) in Suzhou is among the finest gardens in China. It is recognized with the other Classical Gardens of Suzhou as a UNESCO World Heritage Site. The garden demonstrates Chinese garden designers' adept skills for synthesizing art, nature, and architecture to create unique metaphysical masterpieces. The Master of the Nets is particularly regarded among garden connoisseurs for its mastering the techniques of relative dimension, contrast, foil, sequence and depth, and borrowed scenery.

== History ==
The Master of the Nets garden, then called Ten Thousand Volume Hall, was first constructed in 1140 by Shi Zhengzhi, the Deputy Civil Service Minister of the Southern Song dynasty government. Shi Zhengzhi was inspired by the simple and solitary life of a Chinese fisherman depicted in philosophical writings. After his death, the garden passed through numerous ownership and subsequently fell into disarray until around 1785 when it was restored by Song Zongyuan, a retired government official of the Qing dynasty. He drastically redesigned the garden and added multiple buildings, but retained the spirit of the site. He often referred to himself as a fisherman and renamed it the Master of the Nets Garden, as an allusion to the simple life of a fisherman.

Ownership passed to Qu Yuancun, a scholar well-versed in the classics and literature, in 1795. He added and remodelled buildings, planted trees, and arranged stones. The garden acquired the nickname of Qu's Garden during this period as well as its first acclaim by critics. Ownership passed to Li Hongyi, an imperial official and master calligrapher in 1868. About half of the steles in the garden are inscribed by him. Ownership passed to He Chang in 1940, who restored both the garden and returned the name back to Master of Nets Garden. He stipulated in his will the garden should be donated to the government. In 1958, his daughter He Zehui gave the garden to the Suzhou government.

During the late 18th century, it was recognized for its herbaceous peonies. In his Notes on the Master of Nets Garden, Qian Daxin stated, "A good integration of the delights of the village and town." Modern critic Chen Congzhou feels that the Master of the Nets Garden is the best representation of all classical Chinese garden art, as stated in Famous Classical Gardens of China.

== Design ==
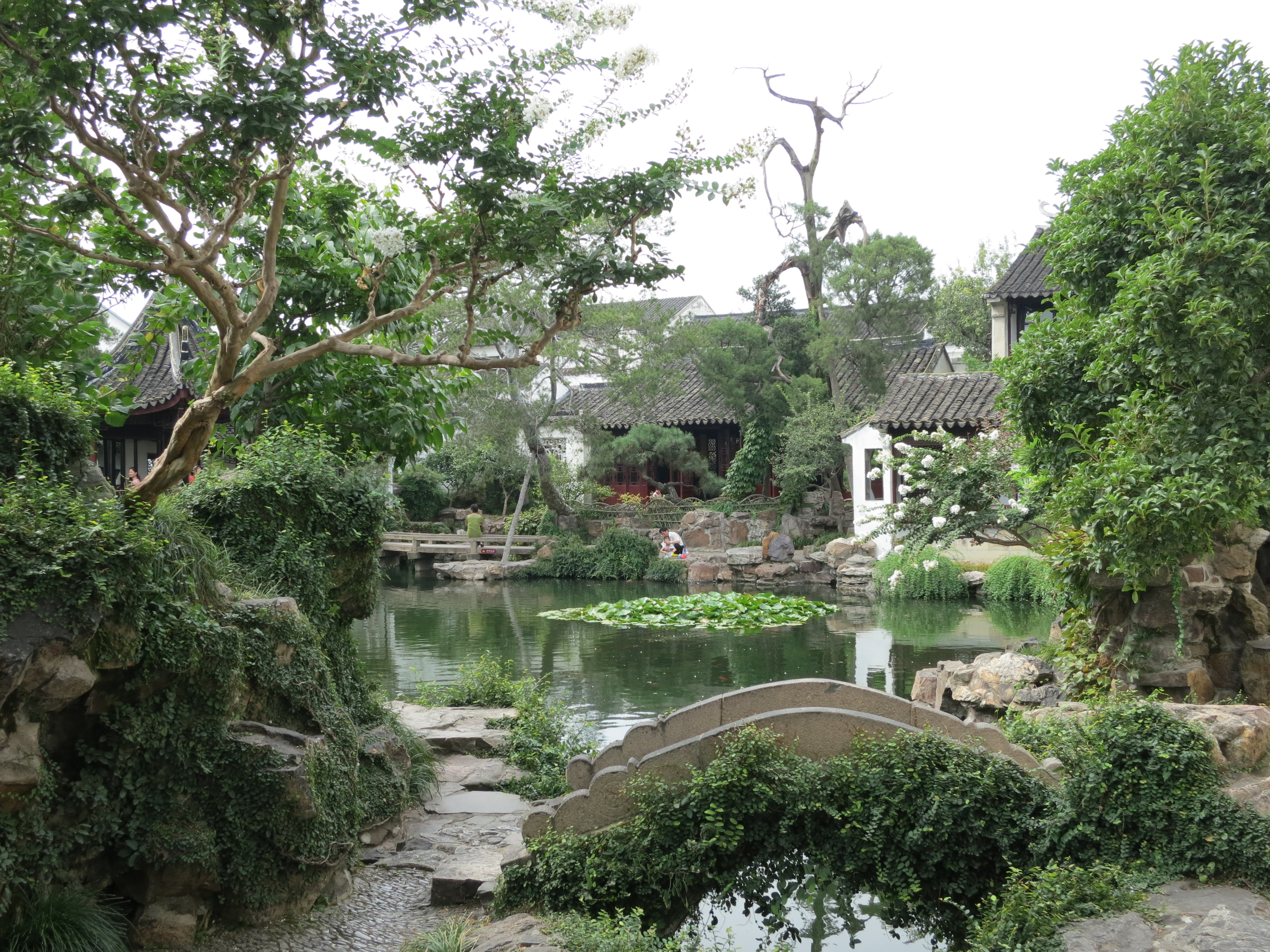
View of the Rosy Cloud Pool with Quietude Bridge in the foreground, Western Garden

The 5,400 m^{2} garden is divided into east and west sections. The eastern part consists of residential quarters, while the gardens are located in the western part. Eastern section is the residential area it is a linear sequence of four halls one tower and three courtyards. The western garden is an ensemble of buildings around the 334 m^{2} Rosy Cloud Pool. Plants and rocks are used to create views that represent several seasons. It also includes three side courts to the east and south. The two dominant elements of the composition are the Barrier of Cloud grotto, a cypress tree dating from the Ming dynasty, and pine several centuries old. The areas to the south of the Rosy Cloud Pool were used for social activities and the areas to the north were used for intellectual activities. The buildings are laid out in a style called close to the water which is used to give the Rosy Clouds Pool the illusion of great size. Small buildings are set on rocks or piers directly over the water surface while large buildings are separated from the pool by yards planted with trees to obscure their size.

Garden design elements with description
Eastern Garden
Beauty Within Reach Tower It is the final hall of the entry sequence. It is a six-bay and two-level tower without a portico. It was used as the women's meeting area. The name refers to the view of distant hills and suburbs from the top level. It has a front court planted with Cassia and a carved brick gate.
Cave of Cloud Hall A three-bay two-story tower with a front portico opening to a courtyard decorated with a Penzai collection. It is gableless, using instead horsehead walls and a high ridge.
Cloud Stairway Room Named after a verse from Xuan Shi Zhi by Zhang Du, "Zhou Sheng fetches the moon in after ascending to the clouds with a rope at the Mid-Autumn Festival". It opens onto a courtyard called the Back Garden. A modern extension was built on the rear of this hall to house a collection of ceramics. It is a three-bay hall with full gables.
Gate A three-bay structure with two bays enclosed as side rooms. It is gableless using instead horsehead walls and a bird motif decorated ridge. It faces a dragon wall across a semiprivate courtyard planted with Weeping Scholar Trees.
Grand Reception Hall The third hall in the sequence. Also called the Hall of Accumulated Benevolence, and Ten Thousand Volume Hall, it is a three-bay. It was used for meeting guests. A carved brick gate at the front depicts scenes from two Kunqu operas; Guo Ziyi Presents Birthday Gifts, and Wen Wang visits the Talents. It is gableless using instead horsehead walls, and a ridge decorated with birds. The attached courtyard is planted with Jade Magnolia.
Sedan-Chair Hall The second hall in the entry sequence. A three-bay hall with a front portico. It is named for the sedan chair used to carry imperial officials. It is connected by a covered passage to the front gate, creating the illusion the two are one structure.
Western Garden
Branch Beyond Bamboo Porch It is also called the Belvedere of Magnificent and Bright Waters. An orthogonal Pavilion structure with a hipped gable roofline and flying eves, beside the Shooting Ducks Corridor. This pavilion was used for tea ceremonies. The gables are decorated with elaborate designs of bats.
Barrier of Clouds Rockery A yellowstone rockery meant to resemble a bank of fog.
Cool Springs Pavilion Named for the adjacent Azure Spring, which was named after a verse by Zhu Xi, "A spring inside is full of clean water". It is a square pavilion with a hipped gable roofline and flying eves attached to the wall of the Inner Garden courtyard. It houses a valuable scholar stone called The Goshawk.
Duck Shooting Corridor A boat shaped three-bay full gable pavilion with pillar couplest in front of the Meditation Study, also called the Prunus mume Pavilion. Shooting ducks was a game played during the Ming dynasty.
Five Peaks Library Named after verse by Li Bai, "There are five peaks south of Mount Lu which look like lotus flowers cut by nature". A tower with full gables and a bird-decorated ridge attached to the Meditation Study, the bottom floor is a five-bay hall. A small grotto of scholar stones is in front of the library and individual scholar stones are located behind it. It is built on the site of the former Ten Thousand Volume Hall of the Song dynasty garden. The upper level is reached by cloud stair rockery.
Inner Garden A 667 m^{2}courtyard connected to the main garden by the Fisherman's Retreat Gate. It was used as a women's area. It is built in the style of a Ming dynasty courtyard decorated with rockeries and scholar stones.
Late Spring Cottage Named after a verse by Su Dongpo, "Only the peony is still flowering in the late spring". It was used to model the "Ming Hall" in the Metropolitan Museum of Art in New York City. This Ming Hall is used in creating an area of display for Ming dynasty artifacts. This ridgeless three-bay hall with full gables and a front portico is contained in the Inner Garden courtyard. A smaller one-bay annex is attached.
Moon Comes with the Breeze Pavilion Named for a verse by Han Yu, "The twilight brings the Autumn and the breeze sends the moon here". It is a hexagonal pavilion structure attached to a covered walkway. It was used for moon watching.
Meditation Study Named after a quote by Zhuang Zi, "Tao is in agreement with emptiness, a state of emptiness is mentality". A three-bay hall with full gables under the library tower used for Buddhist meditation. It is attached to a front courtyard planted with bamboo.
Music Room A square three-bay pavilion with a portico on three sides attached to the back side of the Truth and Harmony Guest House. It has a hipped gable roofline with flying eves. It was used as a stage for performances. The attached courtyard is planted with an ancient pomegranate.
Peony Hall Also called The Hall of Dewy Grace, a three-bay structure with full gables named for a Li Bai verse, "The spring breeze is stroking gently the balustrade and peony is wet with dew". It has front and rear courtyards and a front gable. It is currently used as a teahouse.
Small Hill and Osmanthus fragrans Pavilion Named for a verse from Little Hill Appeals to the Hermit by Yu Xin, "Many sweet Osmanthus fragrans trees are growing at the foot of the mountain". A three-bay hall with a portico on three sides and a hipped gable roofline with flying eves. The yard in front of this hall holds a grove of Cassia trees and scholar stones.
Truth and Harmony Guest House A three-bay hall with a portico on three sides and a hipped gable roofline used as a guest house. It is named after a proverb, "To conduct yourself harmoniously and support the truth." The window screen has elaborately carved net motifs which allude to the garden's name.
Washing Ribbon Pavilion over Water Named from a verse by Chu Ci in The Fishermen, "If the water of Canglang River is clean I wash my ribbon, if the water of the Canglang River is dirty I wash my feet". It is a three-bay terrace with a hipped gable roofline and flying eves. The doors are decorated with carvings that depict scenes from the Romance of the Three Kingdoms.
Watching Pine and Appreciating Paintings Studio A three-bay hall with full gables and a ridge decorated with birds used as an art studio. The yard in front of this hall is planted with several pine and cypress trees from the Ming dynasty. There is an annex attached to the side which connects with the Late Spring Cottage.
Leading to Quietude Bridge A three-step bridge, the smallest in Suzhou.

Details

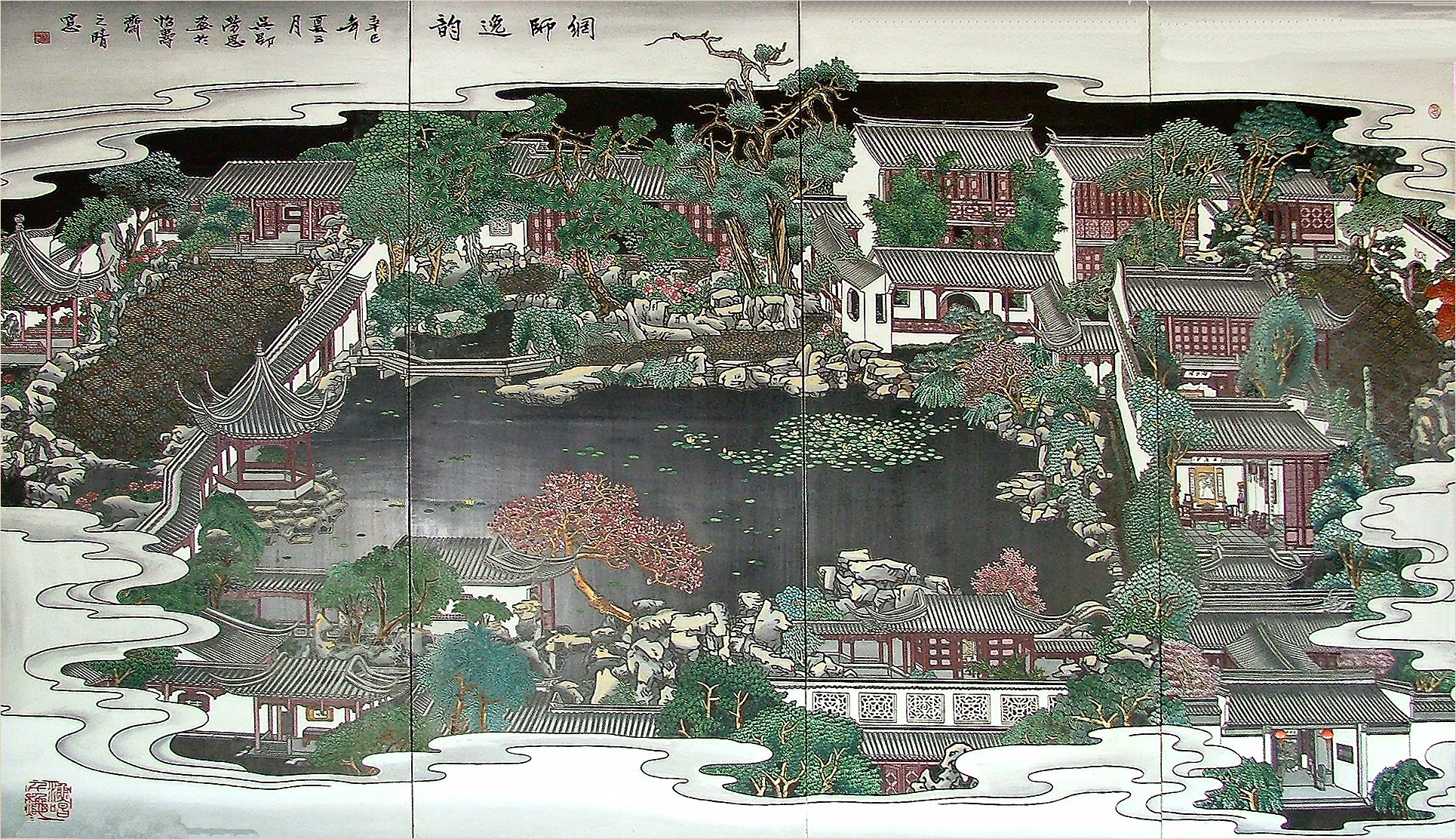
Painted map of the garden

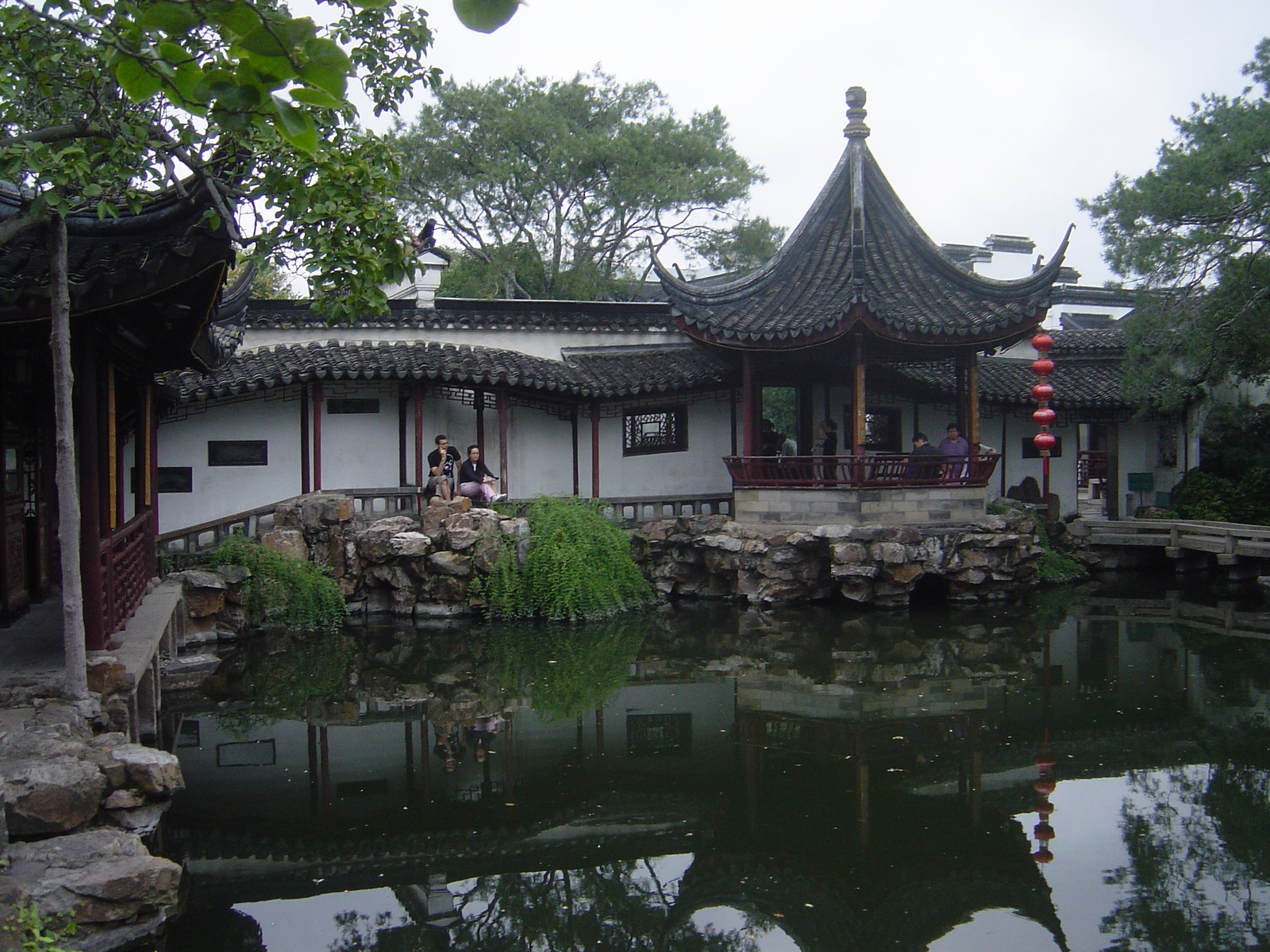
The pond and pavilion

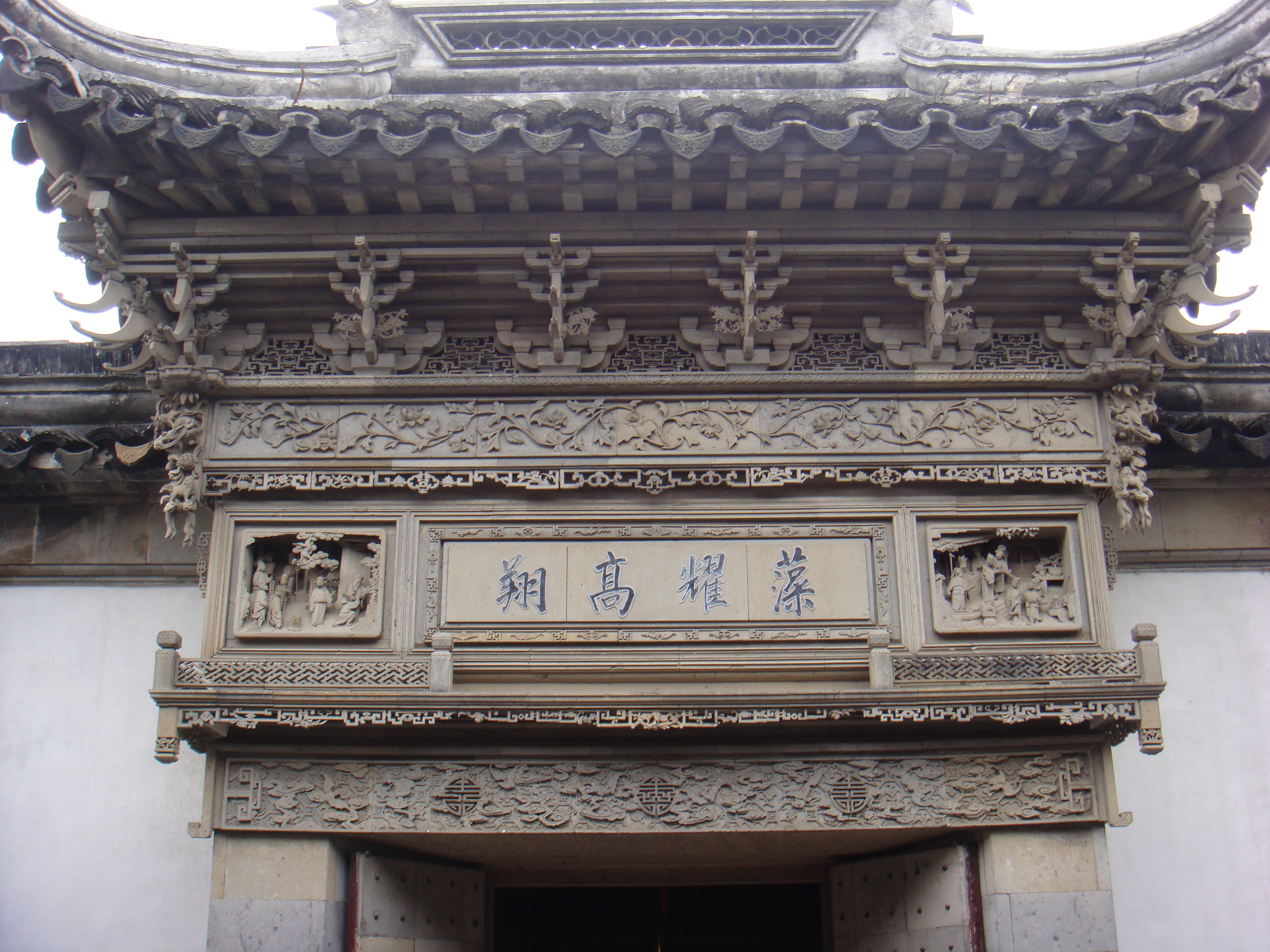
Entry gate detail

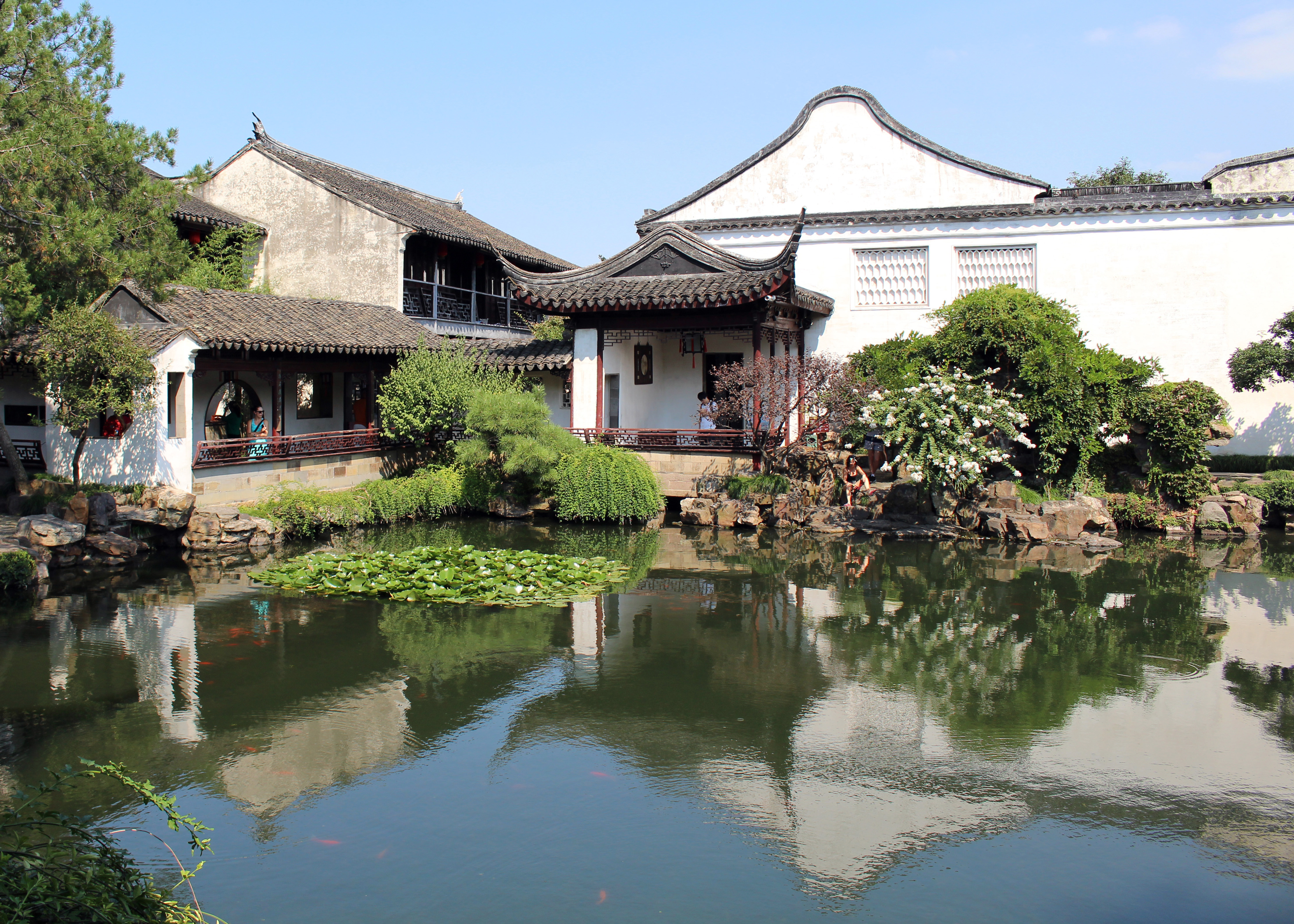
View of the pond

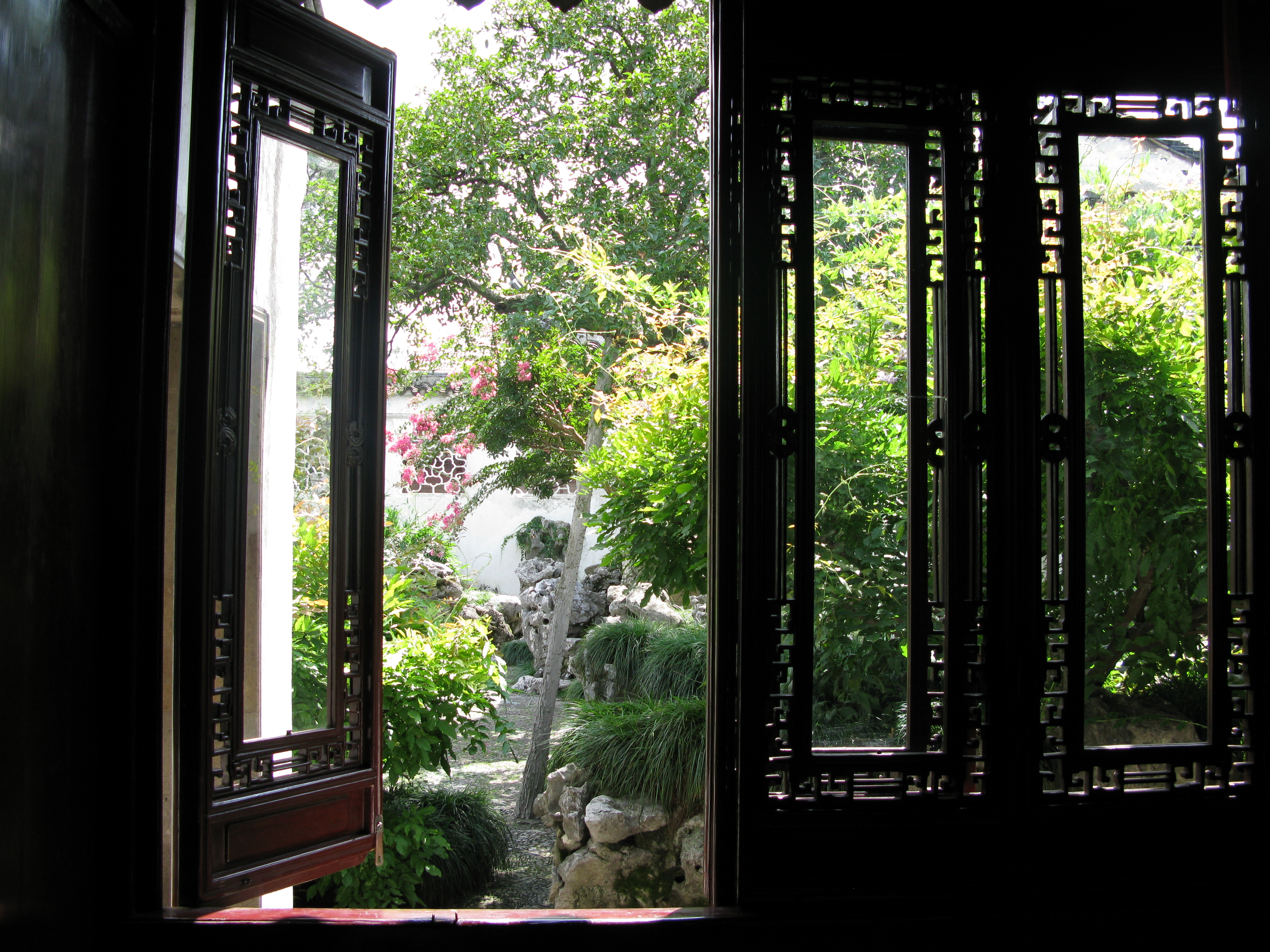
A window in the garden

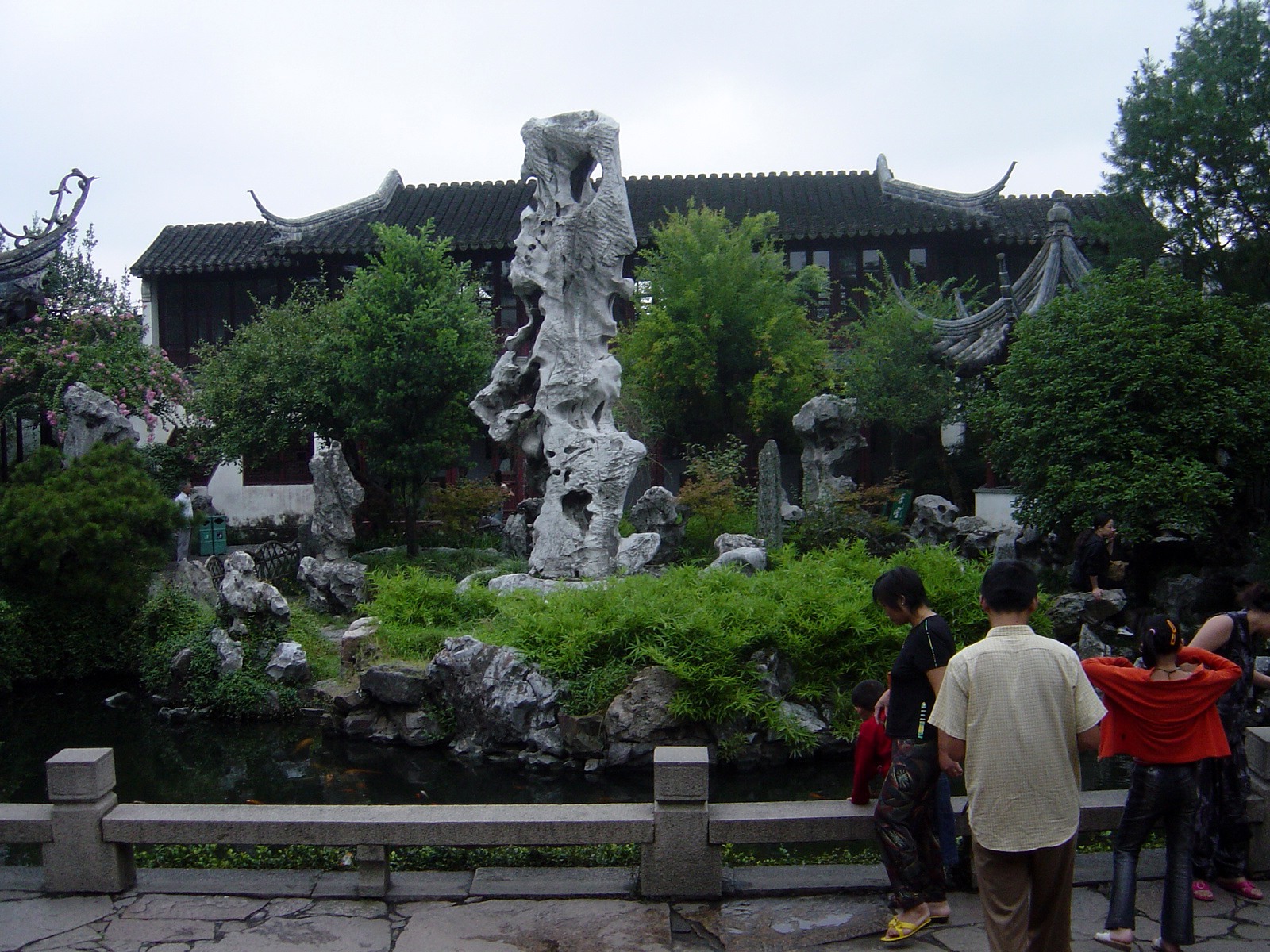

== See also ==
- Astor Court (inspired by the Master of the Nets Garden)
- Chinese garden
